= List of governors of dependent territories in the 19th century =

This is a list of territorial governors in the 19th century (1801–1900), such as the administrators of colonies, protectorates, or other dependencies. Where applicable, native rulers are also listed.

A dependent territory normally does not have full political independence or sovereignty as a sovereign state yet remains politically outside of the controlling state's integral area. The administrators of uninhabited territories are excluded.

== Denmark ==
Denmark–Norway, Denmark
Danish colonial empire
- Monarchs
- Prime ministers

- Danish West Indies

- Governors

- Wilhelm Anton Lindemann, Governor General (1799–1801)

- Casimir Wilhelm von Scholten, Governor of St. Thomas, St. John (1800–1801)
- John Clayton Cowell, Governor of St. Thomas, St. John (1801–1802). British occupation.

- Ernst Frederik von Walterstorff, Governor General (1802)
- Baltharzar Frederik Mühlenfels, Governor General (1802–1807)

- Willum von Rømeling, Governor of St. Thomas, St. John (1802–1803)
- Casimir Wilhelm von Scholten, Governor of St. Thomas, St. John (1803–1807)

- Hans Christopher Lillienskjøld, Governor General (1807)
- Henry Bowyer, Governor General (1807–1808)

- Fitzroy J. Grafton McLean, Governor of St. Thomas, St. John (1807–1815). British occupation.

- Peter Lotharius von Oxholm, Governor General (1815–1816)

- Christian Ludvig von Holten, Governor of St. Thomas, St. John (1815–1818)

- Johan Henrik von Stabel, Governor General (1816)
- Adrian Benjamin Bentzon, Governor General (1816–1820)

- Peter Carl Frederik von Scholten, Governor of St. Thomas, St. John (1818–1820)

- Carl Adolph Rothe, Governor General (1820–1822)

- Christian Ludvig von Holten, Governor of St. Thomas, St. John (1820)
- Peter Carl Frederik von Scholten, Governor of St. Thomas, St. John (1820)
- Carl Gottlieb Fleischer, Governor of St. Thomas, St. John (1820–1822)

- Johan Frederik Bardenfleth, Governor General (1822–1827)

- Carl Wilhelm Jessen, Governor of St. Thomas, St. John (1822–1823)
- Peter Carl Frederik von Scholten, Governor of St. Thomas, St. John (1823–1826)
- Johannes Söbötker, Governor of St. Thomas, St. John (1826–1829)

- Peter Carl Frederik von Scholten, Governor General (1827–1848)

- Frederik Ludvig Christian Pentz Rosenørn, Governor of St. Thomas, St. John (1829–1834)
- Frederik von Oxholm, Governor of St. Thomas, St. John (1834–1836)
- Johannes Söbötker, Governor of St. Thomas, St. John (1836–1848)

- Frederik von Oxholm, acting Governor general (1848)

- Hans Hendrik Berg, Governor of St. Thomas, St. John (1848)

- Peder Hansen, Government Commissioner (1848–1851)

- Frederik von Oxholm, Governor of St. Thomas, St. John (1848–1852)

- Hans Ditmar Frederik Feddersen, Governor General (1851–1855)

- Hans Hendrik Berg, Governor of St. Thomas, St. John (1853–1862)

- Johan Frederik Schlegel, Governor General (1855–1861)
- Vilhelm Ludvig Birch, Governor General (1861–1871)
- John Christmas, Governor General (1871)
- Frantz Ernst Bille, acting Governor general (1871–1872)
- Johan August Stakeman, acting Governor general (1872)
- Janus August Garde, Governor General (1872–1881)
- Christian Henrik Arendrup, Governor General (1881–1893)
- Carl Emil Hedemann, Governor General (1893–1903)

== France ==
French First Republic, First French Empire, Bourbon Restoration, July Monarchy, French Second Republic, French Second Empire, French Third Republic
- Heads of state
- Prime ministers

- Wallis and Futuna, overseas collectivity

- Administrators superior
- Presidents of the Territorial assembly
- Kings of Uvea (Wallis)

- Amelia Tokagahahau Aliki, Queen (1869–1895)
- Isaake, King in rebellion (1895)
- Vito Lavelua II, King (1895–1904)

- Kings of Alo

- Soane Malia Musulamu, King (c.1887–1929)

- Kings of Sigave

- Lutotio, King (c.1889)
- Savelio Keletaona, King (late 19th century)
- Mateo Tamole, King (19th/20th century)
- Toviko Keletaona, King (19th/20th century)

== Germany ==
German Empire
German colonial empire

== Mexico ==
- List of heads of state of Mexico
- Territorial evolution of Mexico
- Alta California

- List of governors of California before 1850

- Capt. Luis Antonio Argüello, Governor (1822–1825)
- Lt. Col. José María de Echeandía, Governor (1825–1831)
- Manuel Victoria, Governor (1831–1832)
- José María de Echeandía, Governor (1831–1832)
- Pío de Jesús Pico, Governor (1832)
- José María de Echeandía, Governor (1832) In opposition, in Los Angeles
- Augustín Vicente Zamorano, provisional Governor (in the north) (1832–1833)
- José María de Echeandía, Governor (in the south) (1832–1833)
- José Figueroa, Governor (1833–1835)
- José Castro, acting Governor (1835–1836)
- Lieutenant Colonel Nicolás Gutiérrez, acting Governor (1836)
- Colonel Mariano Chico, Governor (1836)
- Nicolás Gutiérrez, acting Governor (1836)
- Gen. Juan Bautista Alvarado, self-declared "Presidente de Alta California" following a coup, Governor (1836–1837)
- Carlos Antonio Carrillo, Governor (in opposition to Alvarado) (1837–1838)
- Juan Bautista Valentín Alvarado y Vallejo, Governor (1838–1842) Appointment re-confirmed by the central government.
- Brigadier General José Manuel Micheltorena, Governor (1842–1845)
- Pío de Jesús Pico, Governor (1845–1846)

- California declared a Mexican state (1846)

- General José María Flores, Governor and Comandante General (1846–1847) In Los Angeles, in opposition to the U.S.
- Andrés Pico, acting Governor (1847–1847) In Los Angeles, in opposition to the U.S.

- U.S. occupation (1846—1847)

- John Drake Sloat, military governor (1846)
- Robert Field Stockton, military governor (1846–1847)
- John Charles Frémont, military governor (1847)
- Stephen Watts Kearny, military governor (1847)
- Richard Barnes Mason, acting military governor (1847–1849)

- Santa Fe de Nuevo México (1548–1848)

- Facundo Melgares, acting Governor (1818–1822)
- Francisco Xavier Chávez, Governor (1822–1823)
- José Antonio Vizcarra, Governor (1823–1824)
- Bartolomé Baca, Governor (1823–1825)
- Antonio de Narbona, Governor (1825–1827)
- José Antonio Vizcarra, acting Governor (1825–1827)
- Manuel Armijo, Governor (1827–1829
- José Antonio Chaves, Governor (1829–1832)
- Santiago Abreú, Governor (1832–1833)
- Francisco Sarracino, Governor (1833–1835)
- Albino Pérez, Governor (1835–1837)
- Manuel Armijo, Governor (1837–1844)
- Mariano Chaves, acting Governor (1844)
- Felipe Sena, acting Governor (1844)
- Mariano Martínez de Lejanza, Governor (1844–1845)
- José Chavéz y Castillo, Governor (1845)
- Manuel Armijo, Governor (1845–1846)
- Juan Bautista Vigil y Alarid, acting Governor (1846–1846)

- Texas

- List of Texas Governors and presidents

- Ramón Músquiz, Governor of Coahuila and Tejas (1835)

- Governors of the Texas Revolution

- Henry Smith, provisional governor (1835–1836, continues in opposition)
- James W. Robinson, acting provisional governor (1836)

== Netherlands ==
Batavian Republic, Kingdom of Holland, United Kingdom of the Netherlands, Kingdom of the Netherlands
Dutch colonial empire
- Heads of state
- Prime ministers

Asia

- Dutch East Indies

- Governors general

- Pieter Gerardus van Overstraten, Governors general (1796–1801)
- Johannes Siberg, Governors general (1801–1805)
- Albertus Henricus Wiese, Governors general (1805–1808)
- Herman Willem Daendels, Governors general (1808–1811)
- Jan Willem Janssens, Governors general (1811)
- British occupation (1811–1816)
- Godert van der Capellen, Governors general (1816–1826)
- Leonard du Bus de Gisignies, Governors general (1826–1830)
- Johannes van den Bosch, Governors general (1830–1833)
- Jean Chrétien Baud, Governors general (1833–1836)
- Dominique Jacques de Eerens, Governors general (1836–1840)
- Carel Sirardus Willem van Hogendorp, Governors general (1840–1841)
- Pieter Merkus, Governors general (1841–1844)
- Joan Cornelis Reynst, Governors general (1844–1845)
- Jan Jacob Rochussen, Governors general (1845–1851)
- Albertus Jacobus Duymaer van Twist, Governors general (1851–1856)
- Charles Ferdinand Pahud, Governors general (1856–1861)
- Ludolph Anne Jan Wilt Sloet van de Beele, Governors general (1861–1866)
- Pieter Mijer (governor), Governors general (1866–1872)
- James Loudon (politician), Governors general (1872–1875)
- Johan Wilhelm van Lansberge, Governors general (1875–1881)
- Frederik s'Jacob, Governors general (1881–1884)
- Otto van Rees, Governors general (1884–1888)
- Cornelis Pijnacker Hordijk, Governors general (1888–1893)
- Carel Herman Aart van der Wijck, Governors general (1893–1899)
- Willem Rooseboom, Governors general (1899–1904)

== Oman ==
Al Said of Oman
- Monarchs

- Mombasa

- Walis

- Salim ibn Ahmad al-Mazru‘i, Wali (1826–1835)
- Nasur ibn Ahmad al-Mazru‘i, Wali (1835–1836)
- Rashid ibn Salim al-Mazru‘i, Wali (1836–1837)
- Khamis ibn Rashid al-Mazru‘i, Wali (1837)
- Abdallah ibn Hamish al-Mazru‘i, Wali (1837–1860)
- Mubarrak ibn Rashid al-Mazru‘i, Wali (1860–1873)
- Rashid ibn Hamish al-Mazru‘i, Wali (1873–1895)

== Portugal ==
Kingdom of Portugal, United Kingdom of Portugal, Brazil and the Algarves
Portuguese colonial empire
- Heads of state
- Prime ministers

- Portuguese Cape Verde

- Governors

- Marcelino António Bastos, Governor (1796–1802)
- António Coutinho de Lencastre, Governor (1803–1818)
- António Pusich, Governor (1818–1822)
- João da Matta Chapuzet, Governor (1822–1826)
- Caetano Procópio Godinho de Vasconcelos, Governor (1826–1830)
- Duarte da Costa e Sousa de Macedo, Governor (1830–1831)
- José Coutinho de Lencastre, Governor (1831–1834)
- Manuel António Martins, Governor (1834–1835)
- Joaquim Pereira Marinho, Governor (1835–1836)
- Domingos Correia Arouca, Governor (1836–1837)
- Joaquim Pereira Marinho, Governor (1837–1839)
- João de Fontes Pereira de Melo, Governor (1839–1842)
- Francisco de Paula Bastos, Governor (1842–1845)
- José Miguel de Noronha, Governor (1845–1847)
- João de Fontes Pereira de Melo, Governor (1847–1851)
- Fortunato José Barreiros, Governor (1851–1854)
- António Maria Barreiros Arrobas, Governor (1854–1857)
- Sebastião Lopes de Calheiros Meneses, Governor (1857–1860)
- Januário Correia de Almeida, Governor (1860–1860)
- Carlos Joaquim Franco, Governor (1860–1863)
- José Guedes de Carvalho e Meneses, Governor (1863–1869)
- Caetano Alexandre de Almeida e Albuquerque, Governor (1869–1876)
- G.C. Lopes de Macedo, Governor (1877–1877)
- Vasco Guedes de Carvalho e Meneses, Governor (1878–1878)
- António de Nascimento Pereira de Sampaio, Governor (1879–1881)
- João Paes de Vasconcellos, Governor (1882–1886)
- João Cesário de Lacerda, Governor (1887–1889)
- Augusto Cesário Carlos de Carvalho, Governor (1890–1890)
- José Guedes Brandão de Melo, Governor (1891–1893)
- Fernando de Magalhães e Menezes, Governor (1893–1894)
- José Guedes Brandão de Melo, Governor (1893–1896)
- Alexandre Alberto da Rocha de Serpa Pinto, Governor (1897–1897)
- João Cesário de Lacerda, Governor (1898–1900)

- Portuguese Moçambique

- Governors, Governors general

- Francisco Guedes de Carvalho Meneses da Costa, Governor (1797–1801)
- Isidro de Sousa e Sá, Governor (1801–1805)
- Francisco de Paula de Albuquerque do Amaral Cardoso, Governor (1805–1807)
- Provisional administration, (1807–1809)
- António Manuel de Melo e Castro de Mendonça, Governor (1809–1812)
- Marcos Caetano de Abreu e Meneses, Governor (1812–1817)
- José Francisco de Paula Cavalcanti de Albuquerque, Governor (1817–1818)
- Provisional administration, (1818–1819)
- João da Costa M. Brito-Sanches, Governor (1819–1821)
- Provisional administration, (1821–1824)
- João Manuel da Silva, Governor (1824–1825)
- Sebastião Xavier Botelho, Governor (1825–1829)
- Paulo José Miguel de Brito, Governor (1829–1832)
- Provisional administration, (1832–1834)
- José Gregório Pegado, Governor (1834–1836)

- Moçambique Colony/(Portuguese East Africa)

- Provisional administration, (1836–1837)
- António José de Melo, Governor General (1837)
- João Carlos Augusto de Oeynhausen e Gravenburg, marquês de Aracaty, Governor General (1837–1838)
- Juiz A. de Ramalho de Sá, President of the Governing council (1838–1840)
- Joaquim Pereira Marinho, Governor General (1840–1841)
- João da Costa Xavier, Governor General (1841–1843)
- Rodrigo Luciano de Abreu e Lima, Governor General (1843–1847)
- Domingos Fortunato de Vale, Governor General (1847–1851)
- Joaquim Pinto de Magalhães, Governor General (1851–1854)
- Vasco Guedes de Carvalho e Meneses, Acting Governor general (1854–1857)
- João Tavares d'Almeida, Governor General (1857–1864)
- Cândido M. Montes, President of the Governing council (1864)
- M. António do Canto e Castro, Governor General (1864–1867)
- António Augusto de Almeida Portugal Correia de Lacerda, Governor General (1867–1868)
- M.N.P. de Ataíde e Azevedo, President of the Governing council (1868–1869)
- António Tavares de Almeida, Governor General (1869)
- Fernão da Costa Leal, Governor General (1869)
- Juiz E. K. da Fonseca e Gouveia, President of the Governing council (1869–1870)
- Inácio A. Alves, Acting Governor general (1870)
- José Rodrigues Coelho do Amaral, Governor General (1870–1873)
- Juiz J. M. Crispiniano da Fonseca, President of the Governing council (1873–1874)
- José Guedes de Carvalho e Meneses, Governor General (1874–1877)
- Francisco Maria da Cunha, Governor General (1877–1880)
- Augusto César Rodrigues Sarmento, Acting Governor general (1880–1881)
- Carlos Eugénio Correia da Silva, visconde de Paço d'Arcos, Governor General (1881–1882)
- J. d'Almeida d'Avila, Acting Governor general (1882)
- Agostinho Coelho, Governor General (1882–1885)
- D. Henrique Real da Silva, President of the Governing council (1885)
- Augusto Vidal de Castilho Barreto e Noronha, Governor General (1885–1889)
- José Joaquim d'Almeida, Acting Governor general (1889)
- José António de Brissac das Neves Ferreira, Governor General (1889–1890)
- Joaquim José Machado, Governor General (1890–1891)
- Raphael Jácome Lopes de Andrade, Governor General (1891–1893)
- Francisco Teixeira da Silva, Governor General (1893–1894)
- J. Correia e Lança, Acting Governor general (1894)
- Fernão de Magalhães e Meneses, Governor General (1894–1895)
- António José Enes -Commissioner, Governor General (1895)
- J. Correia e Lança, Acting Governor general (1896)
- Joaquim Mousinho de Albuquerque, Governor General (1896–1897)
- Baltasar Freire Cabral, Acting Governor general (1897–1898)
- Carlos Alberto Schultz Xavier, Governor General (1898)
- Álvaro António Ferreira, Governor General (1898–1900)
- Júlio José, marqués da Costa, Governor General (1900)
- Joaquim José Machado, Governor General (1900)
- Manuel Rafael Gorjão, Governor General (1900–1902)

- Portuguese São Tomé and Príncipe

- Governors

- João Baptista de Silva, Governor (1799–1802)
- Gabriel António Franco de Castro, Governor (1802–1805)
- Luís Joaquim Lisboa, Governor (1805–1817)
- Filipe de Freitas, Governor (1817–1824)
- João Maria Xavier de Brito, Governor (1824–1830)
- Joaquim Bento da Fonseca, Governor (1830–1834)
- Provisional government (1834–1836)
- Fernando Correia Henriques de Noronha, Acting Governor (1836–1837)
- Leandro José da Costa, Governor (1837–1838)
- José Joaquim de Urbanski, Governor (1838–1839)
- Bernardo José de Sousa Soares de Andréa, Governor (1839–1843)
- Leandro José da Costa, Governor (1843)
- José Maria Marquês, Governor (1843–1846)
- Chamber Senate (1846–1847)
- Carlos Augusto de Morais e Almeida, Governor (1847)
- Chamber Senate (1847–1848)
- José Caetano René Vimont Pessoa, Governor (1848–1849)
- Leandro José da Costa, Governor (1849–1851)
- José Maria Marquês, Governor (1851–1853)
- Francisco José da Pina Rolo, Governor (1853–1855)
- Adriano Maria Passaláqua, Governor (1855–1857)
- Chamber Senate (1857–1858)
- Francisco António Correia, Governor (1858)
- Chamber Senate (1858–1859)
- Luís José Pereira e Horta, Governor (1859–1860)
- José Pedro de Melo, Governor (1860–1862)
- Chamber Senate (1862)
- José Eduardo da Costa Moura, Governor (1862–1863)
- João Baptista Brunachy, Governor (1863–1864)
- Estanislau Xavier de Assunção e Almeida, Governor (1864–1865)
- João Baptista Brunachy, Governor (1865–1867)
- António Joaquim da Fonseca, Governor (1867)
- Estanislau Xavier de Assunção e Almeida, Governor (1867–1869)
- Pedro Carlos de Aguiar Craveiro Lopes, Governor (1869–1872)
- João Clímaco de Carvalho, Governor (1872–1873)
- Gregório José Ribeiro, Governor (1873–1876)
- Estanislau Xavier de Assunção e Almeida, Governor (1876–1879)
- Francisco Joaquim Ferreira do Amaral, Governor (1879)
- Custódio Miguel de Borja, Acting Governor, Governor (1879–1880)
- Vicente Pinheiro Lôbo Machado de Melo e Almada, Governor (1880–1881)
- Augusto Maria Leão, Acting Governor (1881–1882)
- Francisco Teixeira da Silva, Governor (1882)
- Custódio Miguel de Borja, Governor (1884–1886)
- Augusto César Rodrigues Sarmento, Governor (1886–1890)
- Firmino José da Costa, Governor (1890–1891)
- Francisco Eugénio Pereira de Miranda, Governor (1891–1894)
- Jaime Lobo Brito Godins, Acting Governor (1894–1895)
- Cipriano Leite Pereira Jardim, Governor (1895–1897)
- Joaquim da Graça Correia e Lança, Governor (1897–1899)
- Amâncio de Alpoim Cerqueira Borges Cabral, Governor (1899–1901)

== Spain ==
Bourbon Spain, Kingdom of Spain, First Spanish Republic, Bourbon Restoration
Spanish colonial empire
- Heads of state
- Prime ministers

- Falkland Islands

- Military Administrators of the Spanish Settlement of Puerto Soledad

- Luis de Medina y Torres, governor and sea commander (1799–1800)
- Francisco Javier de Viana, governor and sea commander (1800–1801)
- Ramón Fernández Villegas, governor and sea commander (1801–1802)
- Bernardo Bonavía, Governor and sea commander (1802–1803)
- Antonio Leal de Ibarra y Oxinando, Governor and sea commander (1803–1804)
- Bernardo Bonavía, Governor and sea commander (1804–1805)
- Antonio Leal de Ibarra y Oxinando, Governor and sea commander (1805–1806)
- Bernardo Bonavía, Governor and sea commander (1806–1809)
- Gerardo Bordas, Governor and sea commander (1809–1810)
- Pablo Guillén Martínez, Governor and sea commander (1810–1811)

- Viceroyalty of New Granada

- Viceroys

- Pedro Mendinueta y Múzquiz, viceroy of New Granada (1797–1803)
- Antonio José de Amar y Borbón Arguedas y Vallejo de Santacruz, viceroy (1803–1810) (1810, President of the Supreme Governing Junta)
- José Miguel Pey y García de Andrade, President of the Supreme Governing Junta (1810–1812)
- Benito Pérez Brito de los Ríos Fernández Valdelomar, viceroy of New Granada (at Portobelo, Panama in refuge from Bogotá) (1812–1813)
- Francisco Montalvo y Ambulodi Arriola y Casabant Valdespino, governor and captain-general (1813–1816), viceroy (1818)
- Juan José de Sámano y Urribarri de Rebollar y Mazorra, viceroy (1818–1819)
- Juan de la Cruz Mourgeon y Achet, titular viceroy (1819–1821)

- New Spain (complete list) –

- Miguel José de Azanza, viceroy (1798–1800)
- Félix Berenguer de Marquina, Viceroy (1800–1803)
- José de Iturrigaray, Viceroy (1803–1808)
- Pedro de Garibay, Viceroy (1808–1809)
- Francisco Javier de Lizana y Beaumont, Archbishop and Viceroy (1809–1810)
- Pedro Catani, President of the Audiencia (1810)
- Francisco Javier Venegas, Viceroy (1810–181)
- Félix María Calleja del Rey, Viceroy (1813–1816)
- Juan Ruiz de Apodaca, Viceroy (1816–1821)
- Francisco Novella Azabal Pérez y Sicardo, Interim Viceroy (1821)
- Juan O'Donojú, Viceroy (1821)

- Viceroyalty of Peru (1542–1824)

- Viceroys

- Ambrosio O'Higgins, 1st Marquess of Osorno, viceroy of Peru (1796–1801)
- Manuel Antonio de Arredondo y Pelegrín, President of the Audiencia and interim viceroy (1801)
- Gabriel de Avilés, 2nd Marquis of Avilés, viceroy (1801–1806)
- José Fernando Abascal y Sousa, marqués de la Concordia; viceroy (1806–1816)
- Joaquín de la Pezuela, 1st Marquess of Viluma, viceroy (1816–1821)
- José de la Serna, 1st Count of the Andes, acting viceroy (1821–1824)
- Juan Pío de Tristán y Moscoso Carasa y Múzquiz, acting viceroy (1824–1826)

- Viceroyalty of the Río de la Plata (1776–1814)

- Viceroys

- Gabriel de Avilés y del Fierro, marqués de Avilés, Viceroy of Rio de la Plata (1799–1801)
- Joaquín del Pino y Rozas Romero y Negrete, Viceroy (1801–1804)
- Rafael de Sobremonte Núñez Castillo Angulo y Bullón Ramírez de Arellano, marqués de Sobremonte, acting viceroy (1804); viceroy (1804—1807)
- William Beresford, 1st Viscount Beresford, British commander in Buenos Aires (1806–1806)
- Santiago Antonio María de Liniers y Bremont (Jacques de Liniers), acting viceroy (1807–1809)
- Baltazar Hidalgo de Cisneros de la Torre, viceroy (1809–1810)
- Francisco Javier de Elío, nominal viceroy (1810–1816)

- Presidents of the Provisional Governing Council of the Provinces of the Río de la Plata, in the name of Fernando VII

- the Municipal Council of Buenos Aires, (1810)
- Baltazar Hidalgo de Cisneros de la Torre, (1810)
- Cornelio Judas Tadeo de Saavedra, (1810–1811)
- Feliciano Antonio Chiclana y Giménez de Paz, President of the Executive Government of the Provinces of the Río de la Plata (1811)

- Presidents of the Superior Provisional Government of the United Provinces of Río de la Plata, in the name of Fernando VII

- Feliciano Antonio Chiclana y Giménez de Paz, (1811–1812)
- Manuel Mariano de Sarratea Altolaguirre, (1812)
- Juan Martín Mariano de Pueyrredón y O'Dogan (1812)

== United Kingdom ==
United Kingdom of Great Britain and Ireland
British colonial empire
- Monarchs
- Prime ministers

=== British Isles ===
- Guernsey, Crown dependency

- British monarchs are the Dukes of Normandy
- Governors

- Charles Grey, Governor (1797–1807)
- George Herbert, Governor (1807–1827)
- William Keppel, Governor (1827–1834)

- Lieutenant governors

- John Ross, Lieutenant governor (1828–1837)
- James Douglas, Lieutenant governor (1837–1842)
- William Francis Patrick Napier, Lieutenant governor (1842–1848)
- John Bell, Lieutenant governor (1848–1854)
- William Thomas Knollys, Lieutenant governor (1854–1856)
- George Harding, Lieutenant governor (1856–1859)
- Marcus Slade, Lieutenant governor (1859–1864)
- Charles Rochfort Scott, Lieutenant governor (1864–1869)
- Edward Charles Frome, Lieutenant governor (1869–1874)
- St George Gerald Foley, Lieutenant governor (1874–1879)
- Alexander Nelson, Lieutenant governor (1879–1883)
- Henry Sarel, Lieutenant governor (1883–1885)
- John Elkington, Lieutenant governor (1885–1889)
- Edward Bulwer, Lieutenant governor (1889–1894)
- Nathaniel Stevenson, Lieutenant governor (1894–1899)
- Michael Saward, Lieutenant governor (1899–1903)

- Bailiffs

- Robert Porrett Le Marchant, Bailiff (1800–1810)
- Peter De Havilland, Bailiff (1810–1821)
- Daniel De Lisle Brock, Bailiff (1821–1843)
- Jean Guille, Bailiff (1843–1845)
- Peter Stafford Carey, Bailiff (1845–1883)
- John de Havilland Utermarck, Bailiff (1883–1884)
- Edgar MacCulloch, Bailiff (1884–1895)
- Thomas Godfrey Carey, Bailiff (1895–1902)

- Ireland, part of the United Kingdom of Great Britain and Ireland but in many ways still a client state or colony

- Lords Lieutenant

- Charles Cornwallis, Lord Lieutenant (1798–1801)
- Philip Yorke, Lord Lieutenant (1801–1805)
- Edward Clive, Lord Lieutenant (1805–1806)
- John Russell, Lord Lieutenant (1806–1807)
- Charles Lennox, Lord Lieutenant (1807–1813)
- Charles Whitworth, Lord Lieutenant (1813–1817)
- Charles Chetwynd-Talbot, Lord Lieutenant (1817–1821)
- Richard Wellesley, Lord Lieutenant (1821–1828)
- Henry Paget, Lord Lieutenant (1828–1829)
- Hugh Percy, Lord Lieutenant (1829–1830)
- Henry Paget, Lord Lieutenant (1830–1833)
- Richard Wellesley, Lord Lieutenant (1833–1835)
- Thomas Hamilton, Lord Lieutenant (1835–1835)
- Constantine Phipps, Lord Lieutenant (1835–1839)
- Hugh Fortescue, Lord Lieutenant (1839–1841)
- Thomas de Grey, Lord Lieutenant (1841–1844)
- William à Court, Lord Lieutenant (1844–1846)
- John Ponsonby, Lord Lieutenant (1846–1847)
- George Villiers, Lord Lieutenant (1847–1852)
- Archibald Montgomerie, Lord Lieutenant (1852–1853)
- Edward Eliot, Lord Lieutenant (1853–1855)
- George Howard, Lord Lieutenant (1855–1858)
- Archibald Montgomerie, Lord Lieutenant (1858–1859)
- George Howard, Lord Lieutenant (1859–1864)
- John Wodehouse, Lord Lieutenant (1864–1866)
- James Hamilton, Lord Lieutenant (1866–1868)
- John Spencer, Lord Lieutenant (1868–1874)
- James Hamilton, Lord Lieutenant (1874–1876)
- John Spencer-Churchill, Lord Lieutenant (1876–1880)
- Francis Cowper, Lord Lieutenant (1880–1882)
- John Spencer, Lord Lieutenant (1882–1885)
- Henry Herbert, Lord Lieutenant (1885–1886)
- John Hamilton-Gordon, Lord Lieutenant (1886–1886)
- Charles Vane-Tempest-Stewart, Lord Lieutenant (1886–1889)
- Lawrence Dundas, Lord Lieutenant (1889–1892)
- Robert Crewe-Milnes, Lord Lieutenant (1892–1895)
- George Cadogan, Lord Lieutenant (1895–1902)

- Isle of Man, Crown dependency

- Lieutenant Governors

- John Murray, Governor-in-chief, Captain General (1793–1804)
- Henry Murray, Lieutenant Governor (1804–1805)
- Cornelius Smelt, Lieutenant Governor (1805–1832)
- John Ready, Lieutenant Governor (1832–1837)
- John Ready, Lieutenant Governor (1837–1845)
- Charles Hope, Lieutenant Governor (1845–1860)
- Mark Quayle, Clerk of the RollsLieutenant Governor (1860–1860)
- Francis Pigott Stainsby Conant, Lieutenant Governor (1860–1863)
- Mark Quayle, Clerk of the RollsLieutenant Governor (1863–1863)
- Henry Loch, Lieutenant Governor (1863–1882)
- Spencer Walpole, Lieutenant Governor (1882–1893)
- Joseph West Ridgeway, Lieutenant Governor (1893–1895)
- John Henniker-Major, Deputy Governor (1895–1902)

- Jersey, Crown dependency

- Governors

- George Townshend, Governor (1796–1807)
- John Pitt, Governor (1807–1820)
- William Beresford, Governor (1820–1854)

- Lieutenant Governors

- Andrew Gordon, Lieutenant Governor (1797–1806)
- George Don, Lieutenant Governor (1806–1814)
- Tomkyns Hilgrove Turner, Lieutenant Governor (1814–1816)
- Hugh Mackay Gordon, Lieutenant Governor (1816–1821)
- Colin Halkett, Lieutenant Governor (1821–1830)
- William Thornton, Lieutenant Governor (1830–1835)
- Archibald Campbell, Lieutenant Governor (1835–1838)
- Edward Gibbs, Lieutenant Governor (1838–1847)
- James Henry Reynett, Lieutenant Governor (1847–1852)
- Frederick Love, Lieutenant Governor (1852–1857)
- Godfrey Charles Mundy, Lieutenant Governor (1857–1860)
- Robert Percy Douglas, Lieutenant Governor (1860–1862)
- B. Loch, acting Lieutenant Governor (1862–1863)
- Burke Cuppage, Lieutenant Governor (1863–1868)
- Philip Melmoth Nelson Guy, Lieutenant Governor (1868–1873)
- William Norcott, Lieutenant Governor (1873–1878)
- Lothian Nicholson, Lieutenant Governor (1878–1883)
- Henry Wray, Lieutenant Governor (1883–1887)
- Charles Brisbane Ewart, Lieutenant Governor (1887–1892)
- Edwin Markham, Lieutenant Governor (1892–1895)
- Edward Hopton, Lieutenant Governor (1895–1900)
- Henry Richard Abadie, Lieutenant Governor (1900–1904)

=== Caribbean ===
- Anguilla, overseas territory

- Governors
- Chief ministers

- Colony of the Bahamas

- Governors

- William Dowdeswell, Governor (1797–1801)
- John Halkett, Governor (1801–1804)
- Charles Cameron, Governor (1804–1820)
- Lewis Grant, Governor (1821–1829)
- James Carmichael Smyth, Governor (1829–1833)
- Blayney Townley Balfour, Governor (1833–1835)
- William MacBean George Colebrooke, Governor (1835–1837)
- Francis Cockburn, Governor (1837–1844)
- George Benvenuto Matthew, Governor (1844–1849)
- John Gregory, Governor (1849–1854)
- Alexander Bannerman, Governor (1854–1857)
- Charles John Bayley, Governor (1857–1864)
- Rawson William Rawson, Governor (1864–1869)
- James Walker, Governor (1869–1871)
- George Cumine Strahan, Governor (1871–1873)
- John Pope Hennessy, Governor (1873–1874)
- William Robinson, Governor (1874–1880)
- Jeremiah Thomas Fitzgerald Callaghan, Governor (1880–1881)
- Charles Cameron Lees, Governor (1882–1884)
- Henry Arthur Blake, Governor (1884–1887)
- Ambrose Shea, Governor (1887–1895)
- William Frederick Haynes Smith, Governor (1895–1898)
- Gilbert Thomas Carter, Governor (1898–1904)

- Colony of Barbados

- Governors of Barbados and the Windward Islands

- William Bishop, Acting Governor (1800–1801)
- Francis Mackenzie, Governor (1802–1806)
- John Spooner, Acting Governor (1806–1810)
- George Beckwith, Governor (1810–1815)
- James Leith, Governor (1815–1816)
- John Foster Alleyne, Acting Governor (1817)
- Stapleton Cotton, Governor (1817–1820)
- John Brathwaite Skeete, Acting Governor (1820)
- Samuel Hinds, Acting Governor (1821)
- Henry Warde, Governor (1821–1829)
- James Lyon, Governor (1829–1833)
Governorship and colony combined with that of British Windward Islands (1833–1885)
- Charles Cameron Lees, Governor (1885–1889)
- Walter Joseph Sendall, Governor (1889–1891)
- James Shaw Hay, Governor (1891–1900)
- Frederick Mitchell Hodgson, Governor (1900–1904)

- Barbados and the British Windward Islands

- Governors

- Lionel Smith, Governor (1833–1836)
- Evan John Murray MacGregor, Governor (1836–1841)
- Charles Henry Darling, Governor (1841)
- Charles Edward Grey, Governor (1841–1846)
- William Reid, Governor (1846–1848)
- William MacBean George Colebrooke, Governor (1848–1856)
- Francis Hincks, Governor (1856–1862)
- James Walker, Governor (1862–1868)
- Rawson William Rawson, Governor (1868–1875)
- Sanford Freeling, Acting Governor (1875)
- John Pope Hennessy, Governor (1875–1876)
- George Cumine Strahan, Governor (1876–1880)
- D. J. Gamble, Acting Governor (1880)
- William Robinson, Governor (1880–1885)

- Cayman Islands, overseas territory

- Chief magistrates

- William Bodden, Chief magistrate (1776–1823)
- James Coe the Elder, Chief magistrate (1823–1829)
- John Drayton, Chief magistrate (1829–1842)
- James Coe the Younger, Chief magistrate (1842–1855)
- William Eden, Chief magistrate (1855–1879)
- William Bodden Webster, Chief magistrate (1879–1888)
- Edmund Parsons, Chief magistrate (1888–1898)
- Frederick Shedden Sanguinnetti, Commissioner (1898–1907)

- Colony of Jamaica

- Governors

- George Nugent, Governor (1801–1805)
- Eyre Coote, Governor (1806–1808)
- William Montagu, Governor (1808–1821)
- John Keane, Acting Governor (1827–1829)
- Somerset Lowry-Corry, Governor (1829–1832)
- George Cuthbert, Acting Governor (1832)
- Constantine Phipps, Governor (1832–1834)
- Amos Norcott, Acting Governor (1834)
- George Cuthbert, Acting Governor (1834)
- Howe Peter Browne, Governor (1834–1836)
- Lionel Smith, Governor (1836–1839)
- Charles Theophilus Metcalfe, Governor (1839–1842)
- James Bruce, Governor (1842–1846)
- George Henry Frederick Berkeley, Acting Governor (1846–1847)
- Charles Edward Grey, Governor (1847–1853)
- Henry Barkly, Governor (1853–1856)
- Edward Wells Bell, Acting Governor (1856–1857)
- Charles Henry Darling, Governor (1857–1862)
- Edward John Eyre, Acting Governor (1862–1864), Governor (1864–1865)
- Henry Knight Storks, Governor (1865–1866)
- John Peter Grant, Governor (1866–1874)
- W. A. G. Young, Acting Governor (1874)
- William Grey, Governor (1874–1877)
- Edward Everard Rushworth Mann, Acting Governor (1877)
- Anthony Musgrave, Governor (1877–1883)
- Somerset M. Wiseman Clarke, Acting Governor (1883)
- Dominic Jacotin Gamble, Acting Governor (1883)
- Henry Wylie Norman, Governor (1883–1889)
- William Clive Justice, Acting Governor (1889)
- Henry Arthur Blake, Governor (1889–1898)
- Henry Jardine Hallowes, Acting Governor (1898)
- Augustus William Lawson Hemming, Governor (1898–1904)

- Turks and Caicos Islands, overseas territory

- Commissioners

- Daniel Thomas Smith, Commissioner (1874–1878)
- Edward Noel Walker, Commissioner (1878)
- Robert Baxter Llewelyn, Commissioner (1878–1883)
- Frederick Shedden Sanguinetti, Commissioner (1883–1885)
- Henry Moore Jackson, Commissioner (1885–1888)
- Alexis Wynns Harriott, Commissioner (1888–1891)
- Henry Huggins, Commissioner (1891–1893)
- Edward John Cameron, Commissioner (1893–1899)
- Geoffrey Peter St. Aubyn, Commissioner (1899–1901)

- British Virgin Islands, overseas territory

- Administrators

- Edward John Cameron, Administrator (1887–1894)
- Alexander R. Mackay, Administrator (1894–1896)
- Nathaniel George Cookman, Administrator (1896–1903)

- British Windward Islands

See also "Barbados and the British Windward Islands" above.

- Governors

=== Mediterranean ===
- Gibraltar

- Governors

- Charles O'Hara, Governor (1795–1802)
- Charles Barnett, Governor (1802)
- Prince Edward, Governor (1802–1820)
- Thomas Trigge, Acting Governor (1803–1804)
- Henry Edward Fox, Acting Governor (1804–1806)
- James Drummond, Acting Governor (1806)
- Hew Dalrymple, Acting Governor (1806–1808)
- James Drummond, Acting Governor (1808–1809)
- John Cradock, Acting Governor (1809)
- John Smith, Acting Governor (1809)
- Alex McKenzie Fraser, Acting Governor (1809)
- Colin Campbell, Acting Governor (1809–1814)
- George Don, Acting Governor (1814–1821)
- John Pitt, Governor (1820–1835)
- George Don, Acting Governor (1825–1831)
- William Houston, Acting Governor (1831–1835)
- Alexander George Woodford, Governor (1835–1842)
- Robert Wilson, Governor (1842–1848)
- Robert Gardiner, Governor (1848–1855)
- James Fergusson, Governor (1855–1859)
- William Codrington, Governor (1859–1865)
- Richard Airey, Governor (1865–1870)
- William Williams, Governor (1870–1876)
- Robert Napier, Governor (1876–1883)
- John Miller Adye, Governor (1883–1886)
- Arthur Edward Hardinge, Governor (1886–1890)
- Leicester Smyth, Governor (1890–1891)
- H. R. L. Newdigate, Acting Governor (1891)
- Lothian Nicholson, Governor (1891–1893)
- G. J. Smart, Acting Governor (1893)
- Robert Biddulph, Governor (1893–1900)
- George White, Governor (1900–1905)

=== North America ===
- Newfoundland Colony

- Commodore Governors, Governors

- Charles Pole, Commodore Governor (1800–1801)
- James Gambier, Commodore Governor (1802–1803)
- Erasmus Gower, Commodore Governor (1804–1806)
- John Holloway, Commodore Governor (1807–1809)
- John Thomas Duckworth, Commodore Governor (1810–1812)
- Richard Goodwin Keats, Commodore Governor (1813–1816)
- Francis Pickmore, Commodore Governor (1817–1818)
- Charles Hamilton, Commodore Governor (1818–1825)
- Thomas John Cochrane, Governor (1825–1834)
- Henry Prescott, Governor (1834–1841)
- John Harvey, Governor (1841–1846)
- Robert Law (colonial administrator), Governor (1846–1847)
- John Le Marchant, Governor (1847–1852)
- Ker Baillie-Hamilton, Governor (1852–1855)
- Charles Henry Darling, Governor (1855–1857)
- Alexander Bannerman, Governor (1857–1864)
- Anthony Musgrave, Governor (1864–1869)
- Stephen John Hill, Governor (1869–1876)
- John Hawley Glover, Governor (1876–1881)
- Henry Berkeley Fitzhardinge Maxse, Governor (1881–1883)
- John Hawley Glover, Governor (1883–1885)
- William Des Vœux, Governor (1886–1887)
- Henry Arthur Blake, Governor (1887–1889)
- John Terence Nicholls O'Brien, Governor (1889–1895)
- Herbert Harley Murray, Governor (1895–1898)
- Henry Edward McCallum, Governor (1898–1901)

=== Oceania ===
- Bermuda, overseas territory

- Governors

- George Beckwith, Governor (1798–1803)
- Henry Tucker, Governor (1803–1805)
- Francis Gore, Lieutenant governor (1805–1806)
- Henry Tucker, Governor (1806)
- John Hodgson, Governor (1806–1810)
- Samuel Trott, Governor (1810–1811)
- James Cockburn, Governor (1811–1812)
- William Smith, Governor (1812)
- George Horsford, Lieutenant governor (1812–1816)
- James Cockburn, Governor (1814–1816)
- William Smith, Governor (1816–1817)
- James Cockburn, Governor (1817–1819)
- William Smith, Governor (1819)
- William Lumley, Governor (1819–1822)
- William Smith, Governor (1822–1823)
- William Lumley, Governor (1823–1825)
- William Smith, Governor (1825–1826)
- Hilgrove Turner, Governor (1826–1829)
- Robert Kennedy, Acting Governor (1829)
- Hilgrove Turner, Governor (1829–1830)
- Robert Kennedy, Acting Governor (1830)
- Hilgrove Turner, Governor (1830–1832)
- Stephen Chapman, Governor (1832–1835)
- Henry G. Hunt, Acting Governor (1835)
- Robert Kennedy, Governor (1835–1836)
- Stephen Chapman, Governor (1836–1839)
- William Reid, Governor (1839–1846)
- William N. Hutchinson, Acting Governor (1846)
- Charles Elliot, Governor (1846–1852)
- W. Hassell Eden, Acting Governor (1852–1853)
- George Philpots, Acting Governor (1853)
- Soulden Oakley, Acting Governor (1853)
- Thomas C. Robe, Acting Governor (1853)
- Soulden Oakley, Acting Governor (1853)
- Charles Elliot, Governor (1853–1854)
- Montgomery Williams, Acting Governor (1854)
- Freeman Murray, Governor (1854–1859)
- AT. Heniphill, Acting Governor (1859)
- William Munroe, Governor (1859–1860)
- Freeman Murray, Governor (1860–1861)
- Harry Ord, Governor (1861–1864)
- William Munroe, Acting Governor (1864)
- W.H. Hamley, Lieutenant governor (1864–1865)
- Harry St. George Ord, Governor (1865–1866)
- W.H. Hamley, Lieutenant governor (1866–1867)
- Arnold Thompson, Acting Governor (1867)
- Frederick Chapman, Governor (1867–1870)
- W. F. Brett, Lieutenant governor (1870)
- John Henry Lefroy, Governor (1871–1877)
- Robert Michael Laffan, Governor (1877–1882)
- Thomas L. J. Gallwey, Governor (1882–1888)
- Edward Newdegate, Governor (1888–1891)
- Thomas Lyons, Governor (1892–1896)
- George Digby Barker, Governor (1896–1901)

- Falkland Islands

- Commanders, Administrators, Governors

- Luis Vernet, Commander (1829–1831)
- Esteban Mestivier, Commander (1832)
- Henry Smith, Administrator (1833–1838)
- Robert Lowcay, Administrator (1838–1839)
- Robinson, Administrator (1839)
- John Tyssen, Administrator (1839–1841)
- Richard Clement Moody, Lieutenant Governor (1841–1843), Governor (1843–1848)
- George Rennie, Governor (1848–1855)
- Thomas Edward Laws Moore, Governor (1855–1862)
- James George Mackenzie, Governor (1862–1866)
- William Cleaver Francis Robinson, Governor (1866–1870)
- George Abbas Kooli D'Arcy, Governor (1870–1876)
- Jeremiah Thomas Fitzgerald Callaghan, Governor (1876–1880)
- Thomas Kerr, Governor (1880–1886)
- Arthur Cecil Stuart Barkly, Governor (1886–1887)
- Thomas Kerr, Governor (1887–1891)
- Roger Tuckfield Goldsworthy, Governor (1891–1897)
- William Grey-Wilson, Governor (1897–1904)

- Pitcairn Islands

- Magistrates

- John Adams, Leader (1800–1829)
- Joshua Hill, President (1832–1838)

Became a British colony in 1838

- Edward Quintal, Magistrate (1838–1839)
- Arthur Quintal I, Magistrate (1840–1841)
- Fletcher Christian II, Magistrate (1842)
- Matthew McCoy, Magistrate (1843)
- Thursday October Christian II, Magistrate (1844)
- Arthur Quintal II, Magistrate (1845–1846)
- Charles Christian II, Magistrate (1847)
- George Adams, Magistrate (1848)
- Simon Young, Magistrate (1849)
- Arthur Quintal II, Magistrate (1850)
- Thursday October Christian II, Magistrate (1851)
- Abraham Blatchly Quintal, Magistrate (1852)
- Matthew McCoy, Magistrate (1853)
- Arthur Quintal II, Magistrate (1854)
- George Martin Frederick Young, Magistrate (1855–1856)
- Thursday October Christian II, Magistrate (1864)
- Moses Young, Magistrate (1865–1866)
- Thursday October Christian II, Magistrate (1867)
- Robert Pitcairn Buffett, Magistrate (1868)
- Moses Young, Magistrate (1869)
- James Russell McCoy, Magistrate (1870–1872)
- Thursday October Christian II, Magistrate (1873–1874)
- Moses Young, Magistrate (1875)
- Thursday October Christian II, Magistrate (1876–1877)
- James Russell McCoy, Magistrate (1878–1879)
- Thursday October Christian II, Magistrate (1880)
- Moses Young, Magistrate (1881)
- Thursday October Christian II, Magistrate (1882)
- James Russell McCoy, Magistrate (1883)
- Benjamin Stanley Young, Magistrate (1884–1885)
- James Russell McCoy, Magistrate (1886–1889)
- Charles Carleton Vieder Young, Magistrate (1890–1891)
- Benjamin Stanley Young, Magistrate (1892)
- James Russell McCoy, President of the Council (1893–1896)
- William Alfred Young, President of the Council (1897)
- James Russell McCoy, President of the Council (1897–1904)

== United States ==
- Territorial evolution of the United States
- List of states and territories of the United States

=== United States overseas territories ===
==== Caribbean Sea ====
- Puerto Rico Unincorporated territory of the United States Ceded to the U.S. in 1898.

- Governors

- Manuel Macías y Casado, Spanish Governor-general (1898)
- Ricardo de Ortega y Diez, acting governor-general (1898)
- Ángel Rivero Méndez, acting governor-general (1898)
- Nelson Appleton Miles, Commanding General (1898)
- John R. Brooke, military governor (1898)
- Guy Vernor Henry, military governor (1899)
- George Whitefield Davis, military governor (1899–1900)

- Governors (1900–1949)

- Charles Herbert Allen, Governor (1900–1901)

- Cuba: Spain ceded authority to the U.S. in 1899 (de jure from 1899).

- President of the Assembly of Representatives of the Cuban Revolution

- Domingo Méndez Capote, (1898)

- Presidents of the Executive Council of the Assembly of Representatives of the Cuban Revolution

- General Rafael María Portuondo Tomayo, (1898–1899)
- General of Division José Lacret y Morlot, (1899)

- Governors

- Adolfo Jiménez Castellanos, Spanish Governor-general (1898–1899)
- John Rutter Brooke, American Governor-General (1899)
- Leonard Wood, American Governor-General (1899–1902)

==== Pacific Ocean ====
- Territory of Hawaii Annexed by the U.S. in 1898. Organized as territory (1900—1959). Statehood in 1959.

- Territorial Governors

- Sanford B. Dole, Governor (1900–1903)

- American Samoa, unincorporated territory of the United States since the Tripartite Convention of December 2, 1899.

- Governors

- Benjamin Franklin Tilley, Commandant (1900–1901)

- Guam was captured by U.S. Navy 1898. Ceded to the U.S. by the Treaty of Paris of 1898, 1899. Transferred to the United States Navy control in 1898.

- American capture of the territory (1898–present)

- Henry Glass, U.S. Naval commander, acting Commissioner (21 June 1898 – 23 June 1898)
- Francisco Martínez Portusach, acting Commissioner (1898)

- Governors (1898–1899)

- José Sixto (Sisto) y Rodríguez, 3rd acting Commissioner (1898) overthrew Portusach
- Venancio Roberto, 4th acting Commissioner (1898) overthrew Sisto
- José Sisto, acting Commissioner (1899) reinstated by U.S. Navy
- Edward David Taussig, acting Naval governor (1898)
- Joaquín Pérez y Cruz, acting Governor (1899) local council
- William P. Coe, acting Governor (1899) local council
- Captain (USN) Louis A. Kaiser, acting Governor (1899–1899) local council

- American Naval governors (1899–1941)

- Richard Phillips Leary, Naval governor of Guam (1899–1900)
- William Edwin Safford, acting for Leary (1899–1900)
- Seaton Schroeder, Naval governor of Guam (1900–1901)

- Philippines Proclamation of independence (insurrection against Spain and then the U.S.; 12 1898–13 1902). The U.S. occupies Manila (14 1898). Treaty of Paris (1898) ceding the Philippines by Spain to the U.S., proclaimed Philippine Islands (11 1899). U.S. territory (14 1898–3 1942)

- United States Military Government (1898–1901): Governors-General

- Wesley Merritt, U.S. Governor-General (1898)
- Elwell Stephen Otis, U.S. Governor-General (1898–1900)
- Arthur MacArthur Jr., U.S. Governor-General (1900–1901)

== See also ==
- List of state leaders in the 19th century (1801–1850)
- List of state leaders in the 19th century (1851–1900)
- List of state leaders in the 19th-century Holy Roman Empire
- List of state leaders in 19th-century British South Asia subsidiary states
