= List of rulers of the Pitcairn Islands =

Mayor of Pitcairn
- Coat of arms of the Pitcairn Islands
- Incumbent; Shawn Christian since 1 January 2026
- Style: Mayor (Domestically)
- Member of: Island Council
- Seat: Adamstown
- Appointer: Governor of Pitcairn (de jure) Popular vote (de facto)
- Term length: 3 years; renewable
- Formation: 7 December 1999 (current office of the Mayor)
- First holder: Fletcher Christian (as Leader); Steve Christian (as Mayor)
- Deputy: Kevin Young

The Pitcairn Islands, a group of islands in the southern Pacific Ocean, are the last remaining British Overseas Territory in Oceania. Settled by mutineers from the Bounty in 1790, the island was effectively sovereign until 1898, when it was annexed by the United Kingdom and placed under the jurisdiction of the governor of Fiji. When Fiji became independent in 1970, Pitcairn Island was placed under the authority of the British high commissioner (ambassador) to New Zealand. In practice, partly due to its isolation, Pitcairn has effectively had internal self-government throughout this period. From 1790 to 1829, the local head of government was known simply as the leader. They had a president from 1832 to 1838, and a magistrate from that time until 1999, except for an eleven-year gap from 1893 to 1904, when the chief official was the president of the Council. In 1999, the magistrate's non-judicial functions were transferred to the new office of mayor.

== Local heads of government (1790–present) ==
Pitcairn Islands (United Kingdom)
No.	Name (Birth–Death)	Title	Portrait	Tenure		Notes	Governor of Pitcairn	Monarch
No.	Name (Birth–Death)	Title	Portrait	From	Until	Notes	Governor of Pitcairn	Monarch
1	Fletcher Christian (1764–1793)	Leader		23 January 1790	3 October 1793		—N/a	—N/a
2	Edward "Ned" Young (1762–1800)	Leader		3 October 1793	25 December 1800		—N/a	—N/a
3	John "Jack" Adams (1767–1829)	Leader		25 December 1800	5 March 1829		—N/a	—N/a
–	Vacant (Note: The death of John Adams led to a constitutional crisis. An important leader was Thursday October Christian, the first son of Fletcher Christian and the first child born on the island. In the ensuing period, the islanders tried to relocate to Tahiti, until the arrival of Joshua Hill.)			5 March 1829	October 1832		—N/a	—N/a
4	Joshua Hill (1773–1844?)	President		October 1832	1838		—N/a	—N/a
5	Edward Quintal (1800–1841)	Magistrate		1838	1839		—N/a	Victoria
6	Arthur Quintal I (1795–1873)	Magistrate		1840	1841		—N/a	Victoria
7	Fletcher Christian II (1812–1852)	Magistrate		1842	1842		—N/a	Victoria
8	Matthew McCoy (1819–1853)	Magistrate		1843	1843	1st term	—N/a	Victoria
9	Thursday October Christian II (1820–1911)	Magistrate		1844	1844	1st term	—N/a	Victoria
10	Arthur Quintal II (1816–1902)	Magistrate		1845	1846	1st term	—N/a	Victoria
11	Charles Christian II (1818–1886)	Magistrate		1847	1847		—N/a	Victoria
12	George Adams (1804–1873)	Magistrate		1848	1848		—N/a	Victoria
13	Simon Young (1823–1893)	Magistrate		1849	1849		—N/a	Victoria
14	Arthur Quintal II (1816–1902)	Magistrate		1850	1850	2nd term	—N/a	Victoria
15	Thursday October Christian II (1820–1911)	Magistrate		1851	1851	2nd term	—N/a	Victoria
16	Abraham Blatchly Quintal (1827–1910)	Magistrate		1852	1852		—N/a	Victoria
17	Matthew McCoy (1819–1853)	Magistrate		1853	1853	2nd term	—N/a	Victoria
18	Arthur Quintal II (1816–1902)	Magistrate		1854	1854	3rd term	—N/a	Victoria
19	George Martin Frederick Young (1822–1909)	Magistrate		1855	3 May 1856		—N/a	Victoria
–	Vacant due to relocation to Norfolk Island			1856	1864		—N/a	Victoria
20	Thursday October Christian II (1820–1911)	Magistrate		1864	1864	3rd term	—N/a	Victoria
21	Moses Young (1829–1909)	Magistrate		1865	1866	1st term	—N/a	Victoria
22	Thursday October Christian II (1820–1911)	Magistrate		1867	1867	4th term	—N/a	Victoria
23	Robert Pitcairn Buffett (1830–1916)	Magistrate		1868	1868		—N/a	Victoria
24	Moses Young (1829–1909)	Magistrate		1869	1869	2nd term	—N/a	Victoria
25	James Russell McCoy (1845–1924)	Magistrate		1870	1872	1st term	—N/a	Victoria
26	Thursday October Christian II (1820–1911)	Magistrate		1873	1874	5th term	—N/a	Victoria
27	Moses Young (1829–1909)	Magistrate		1875	1875	3rd term	—N/a	Victoria
28	Thursday October Christian II (1820–1911)	Magistrate		1876	1877	6th term	—N/a	Victoria
29	James Russell McCoy (1845–1924)	Magistrate		1878	1879	2nd term	—N/a	Victoria
30	Thursday October Christian II (1820–1911)	Magistrate		1880	1880	7th term	—N/a	Victoria
31	Moses Young (1829–1909)	Magistrate		1881	1881	4th term	—N/a	Victoria
32	Thursday October Christian II (1820–1911)	Magistrate		1882	1882	8th term	—N/a	Victoria
33	James Russell McCoy (1845–1924)	Magistrate		1883	1883	3rd term	—N/a	Victoria
34	Benjamin Stanley Young (1851–1934)	Magistrate		1884	1885	1st term	—N/a	Victoria
35	James Russell McCoy (1845–1924)	Magistrate		1886	1889	4th term	—N/a	Victoria
36	Charles Carleton Vieder Young (1850–1941)	Magistrate		1890	1891		—N/a	Victoria
37	Benjamin Stanley Young (1851–1934)	Magistrate		1892	1892	2nd term	—N/a	Victoria
38	James Russell McCoy (1845–1924)	President of the Council		1893	1896	5th term	—N/a	Victoria
39	William Alfred Young (1863–1911)	President of the Council		1897	1897	1st term	—N/a	Victoria
40	James Russell McCoy (1845–1924)	President of the Council		1897	1903	6th term	—N/a	Victoria
40	James Russell McCoy (1845–1924)	President of the Council		1897	1903	6th term	—N/a	Edward VII
41	William Alfred Young (1863–1911)	President of the Council		1904	1904	2nd term	—N/a	Edward VII
42	James Russell McCoy (1845–1924)	Magistrate		1905	1906	7th term	—N/a	Edward VII
43	Arthur Herbert Young (1873–1943)	Magistrate		1907	1907	1st term	—N/a	Edward VII
44	William Alfred Young (1863–1911)	Magistrate		1908	1908	3rd term	—N/a	Edward VII
45	Matthew Edmond McCoy (1868–1929)	Magistrate		1909	1909		—N/a	Edward VII
46	Gerard Bromley Robert Christian (1870–1919)	Magistrate		1910	1919		—N/a	Edward VII
46	Gerard Bromley Robert Christian (1870–1919)	Magistrate		1910	1919		—N/a	George V
47	Charles Richard Parkin Christian (1883–1971)	Magistrate		1920	1920	1st term	—N/a	George V
48	Frederick Martin Christian (1883–1971)	Magistrate		1921	1921	1st term	—N/a	George V
49	Charles Richard Parkin Christian (1883–1971)	Magistrate		1922	1922	2nd term	—N/a	George V
50	Edgar Allen Christian (1879–1960)	Magistrate		1923	1924	1st term	—N/a	George V
51	Charles Richard Parkin Christian (1883–1971)	Magistrate		1925	1925	3rd term	—N/a	George V
52	Richard Edgar Christian (1882–1940)	Magistrate		1926	1929	1st term	—N/a	George V
53	Arthur Herbert Young (1873–1943)	Magistrate		1930	1931	2nd term	—N/a	George V
54	Edgar Allen Christian (1879–1960)	Magistrate		1932	1932	2nd term	—N/a	George V
55	Charles Richard Parkin Christian (1883–1971)	Magistrate		1933	1934	4th term	—N/a	George V
56	Richard Edgar Christian (1882–1940)	Magistrate		1935	1938	2nd term	—N/a	George V
56	Richard Edgar Christian (1882–1940)	Magistrate		1935	1938	2nd term	—N/a	Edward VIII
56	Richard Edgar Christian (1882–1940)	Magistrate		1935	1938	2nd term	—N/a	George VI
57	Arthur Herbert Young (1873–1943)	Magistrate		1939	1939	3rd term	—N/a	George VI
58	Richard Edgar Christian (1882–1940)	Magistrate		1940	1940	3rd term	—N/a	George VI
59	Andrew Clarence David Young (1899–1988)	Magistrate		1940	1940		—N/a	George VI
60	Arthur Herbert Young (1873–1943)	Magistrate		1941	1941	4th term	—N/a	George VI
61	Frederick Martin Christian (1883–1971)	Magistrate		1942	1943	2nd term	—N/a	George VI
62	Charles Richard Parkin Christian (1883–1971)	Magistrate		1944	1945	5th term	—N/a	George VI
63	Norris Henry Young (1887–1974)	Magistrate		1945	1948		—N/a	George VI
64	Charles Richard Parkin Christian (1883–1971)	Magistrate		1949	1949	6th term	—N/a	George VI
65	Warren Clive Christian (1914–2003)	Magistrate		1950	1951	1st term	—N/a	George VI
66	John Lorenzo Christian (1895–1984)	Magistrate		1952	1954	1st term	—N/a	George VI
66	John Lorenzo Christian (1895–1984)	Magistrate		1952	1954	1st term	—N/a	Elizabeth II
67	Charles Richard Parkin Christian (1883–1971)	Magistrate		1955	1957	7th term	—N/a	Elizabeth II
68	Warren Clive Christian (1914–2003)	Magistrate		1958	1959	2nd term	—N/a	Elizabeth II
69	John Lorenzo Christian (1895–1984)	Magistrate		1959	1966	2nd term	—N/a	Elizabeth II
70	Pervis Ferris Young (1928–2003)	Magistrate		1967	December 1975		—N/a	Elizabeth II
70	Pervis Ferris Young (1928–2003)	Magistrate		1967	December 1975		Sir Arthur Norman Galsworthy	Elizabeth II
70	Pervis Ferris Young (1928–2003)	Magistrate		1967	December 1975		Sir David Aubrey Scott	Elizabeth II
71	Ivan Christian (1919–1991)	Magistrate		December 1975	December 1984		Sir Harold Smedley	Elizabeth II
71	Ivan Christian (1919–1991)	Magistrate		December 1975	December 1984		Richard Stratton	Elizabeth II
72	Brian Young (born 1954)	Magistrate		December 1984	1 January 1991		Terence Daniel O'Leary	Elizabeth II
72	Brian Young (born 1954)	Magistrate		December 1984	1 January 1991		Robin Byatt	Elizabeth II
72	Brian Young (born 1954)	Magistrate		December 1984	1 January 1991		David Moss	Elizabeth II
73	Jay Warren (born 1956)	Magistrate		1 January 1991	7 December 1999	1st term	David Moss	Elizabeth II
73	Jay Warren (born 1956)	Magistrate		1 January 1991	7 December 1999	1st term	Robert John Alston	Elizabeth II
73	Jay Warren (born 1956)	Magistrate		1 January 1991	7 December 1999	1st term	Martin Williams	Elizabeth II
74	Steve Christian (born 1951)	Mayor		7 December 1999	8 November 2004	(Note: Dismissed from office by the Foreign and Commonwealth Office following his four rape convictions.)	Martin Williams	Elizabeth II
74	Steve Christian (born 1951)	Mayor		7 December 1999	8 November 2004	(Note: Dismissed from office by the Foreign and Commonwealth Office following his four rape convictions.)	Richard Fell	Elizabeth II
75	Brenda Christian (born 1953)	Acting Mayor		8 November 2004	15 December 2004		Richard Fell	Elizabeth II
76	Jay Warren (born 1956)	Mayor		1 January 2005	31 December 2007	2nd term	Richard Fell	Elizabeth II
76	Jay Warren (born 1956)	Mayor		1 January 2005	31 December 2007	2nd term	George Fergusson	Elizabeth II
77	Mike Warren (born 1964)	Mayor		1 January 2008	31 December 2013		George Fergusson	Elizabeth II
77	Mike Warren (born 1964)	Mayor		1 January 2008	31 December 2013		Mike Cherrett	Elizabeth II
77	Mike Warren (born 1964)	Mayor		1 January 2008	31 December 2013		Victoria "Vicki" Treadell	Elizabeth II
78	Shawn Christian (born 1975)	Mayor		1 January 2014	31 December 2019	1st term	Victoria "Vicki" Treadell	Elizabeth II
78	Shawn Christian (born 1975)	Mayor		1 January 2014	31 December 2019	1st term	Jonathan Sinclair	Elizabeth II
78	Shawn Christian (born 1975)	Mayor		1 January 2014	31 December 2019	1st term	Robin Shackell	Elizabeth II
78	Shawn Christian (born 1975)	Mayor		1 January 2014	31 December 2019	1st term	Laura Clarke	Elizabeth II
79	Charlene Warren-Peu (born 1979)	Mayor		1 January 2020	31 December 2022		Laura Clarke	Elizabeth II
79	Charlene Warren-Peu (born 1979)	Mayor		1 January 2020	31 December 2022		Iona Thomas	Elizabeth II
79	Charlene Warren-Peu (born 1979)	Mayor		1 January 2020	31 December 2022		Iona Thomas	Charles III
80	Simon Young (born 1965)	Mayor		1 January 2023	31 December 2025		Iona Thomas	Charles III
81	Shawn Christian (born 1975)	Mayor		1 January 2026	Incumbent	2nd term	Iona Thomas	Charles III
81	Shawn Christian (born 1975)	Mayor		1 January 2026	Incumbent	2nd term	Louise Cantillon	Charles III
Sources: Pitcairn Island Civil Recorder (1864–1964)

== Colonial governors (1898–present) ==
See separate articles:

- Governors of Fiji (1898–1970)
- British High Commissioners to New Zealand (1970–present)

== See also ==
- List of current heads of government in the United Kingdom and dependencies
- History of the Pitcairn Islands
