= Descendants of the Bounty mutineers =

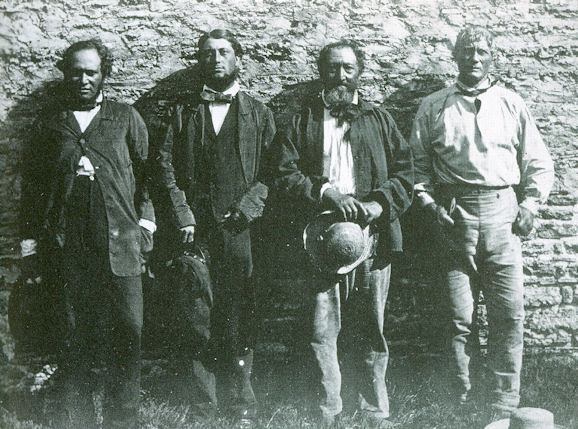
- Descendants of the mutineers John Adams and Matthew Quintal on Norfolk Island, 1862

Total population
- ~1,000 worldwide

Regions with significant populations
- Pitcairn Islands: ~45 (2021)
- Norfolk Island: ~450 (2016)
- Australia: ~250 (2016)
- New Zealand: ~45 (2018)

Languages
- English; Pitkern; Norfuk

Religion
- Seventh-day Adventist Church

Related ethnic groups
- English people; Tahitians; Scottish people; Irish people; Cornish people; Manx people

The descendants of the Bounty mutineers include the modern-day Pitcairn Islanders as well as a little less than half of the population of Norfolk Island. Their common ancestors were the nine surviving mutineers from the merchant ship HMS Bounty, who mutinied as the ship crossed the south Pacific Ocean in 1789. Their descendants also live in New Zealand, Australia, and the United States.

== Origins ==
The nine surviving mutineers from HMS Bounty arrived on Pitcairn on 15 January 1790 with eleven Tahitian women and six men. Each of the mutineers took one woman as a wife, with the two remaining women to be shared by the six Tahitian men, which they resented. According to author Caroline Alexander, the women were "passed around from one 'husband' to the other". Fletcher Christian, Ned Young, John Adams, John Mills, William McCoy, and Matthew Quintal had relationships with six Tahitian women. Mauatua, Toofaiti, Vahineatua, and Teio had children from two of the mutineers and one of their sons. Tevarua and Teraura had only one partner. Together they had 24 children, who in turn had 77 children. Because of the scarcity of people on the island, many of the mutineers' children and grandchildren intermarried, with some marrying first and second cousins.

When John Williams' and John Adams' wives died, they commandeered two of the Polynesian men's wives, who plotted to kill the men in retribution. Two of the plotters were killed instead. On 20 September 1793, the four remaining Polynesian men stole muskets and killed Christian, Mills, Brown, Martin, and Williams. The remaining seamen—Adams, McCoy, Quintal, and Young, with the assistance of Teraura, the wife of Ned Young—who beheaded the Polynesian Tetahiti while he slept—soon killed the Polynesian men. In 1798, McCoy built a still. He, Quintal, and some of the women were continually drunk. On 20 April 1798, McCoy attached a rock to his neck with a rope and leaped over a cliff to his death. Quintal became increasingly erratic and threatened to kill the other seamen and their wives. In 1799, Adams and Young killed him. Young died of an asthma attack in 1800. Adams lived until 1829. Occasionally a new person would arrive on the island bringing with them a new surname (like Samuel Russell Warren from the United States, whose descendants still live on the island today).

== First generations ==
- Fletcher Christian (25 September 1764 – 20 September 1793)
- m. Mauatua a.k.a. Maimiti, Mi'Mitti, Mainmast, Isabella; also consort of Ned Young (c. 1764 – 1841)
  - Thursday October Christian I (7 October 1790 – 21 April 1831)
    - m. Teraura, a.k.a. Susan (c. 1775 – 1850); also consort of Ned Young
      - Joseph John Christian (1805 – 24 November 1831)
      - Charles Christian (January 1808 – 25 June 1831) m. Maria Christian, granddaughter of Fletcher Christian, his first cousin
      - Mary Christian (1810 – 25 October 1852), consort of John Buffett, an English sailor who volunteered to remain on the island as teacher
      - Polly Christian (1814 – 16 May 1831) m. Edward Young, son of Ned Young
      - Peggy Christian (1815 – 12 May 1884) m. 1) Daniel McCoy, grandson of William McCoy; m. 2) Fletcher Christian II, her first cousin
      - Thursday October Christian II (October 1820 – 27 May 1911) m. Mary Polly Young, granddaughter of Ned Young
  - Charles Christian (c. 1792 – 14 January 1842)
    - m. Sully or Sarah (March 1789 – 7 March 1826), daughter of Teio
      - Sarah Christian (1810 – 5 December 1899) m. George Hunn Nobbs, Pitcairn's first minister
      - Fletcher Christian II (1812 – 5 April 1852) m. Peggy Christian, granddaughter of Fletcher Christian, his first cousin
      - Edward Christian (1814 – 3 June 1831) unmarried
      - Maria Christian (1816 – 12 January 1889) m. 1) Charles Christian, grandson of Fletcher Christian, her first cousin (see); m. 2) John Quintal, grandson of Matthew Quintal (see); m. 3) William Quintal, grandson of Matthew Quintal (see)
      - Charles Christian II (1818 – 22 May 1886) m. Charlotte Quintal, granddaughter of Matthew Quintal
      - Mary Christian (1819 – 25 April 1843) m. Arthur Quintal, son of Matthew Quintal (see)
      - Margaret Christian (22 February 1822 – 30 November 1874) m. Matthew McCoy, grandson of William McCoy (see)
      - Isaac Christian (26 April 1825 – 31 October 1877) m. Miriam Young, granddaughter of Ned Young
  - Mary Ann Christian (21 September 1793 – 2 January 1866)

- Ned Young (c. 1762 – 25 December 1800)
- m. Mauatua, also consort of Fletcher Christian
  - Edward Young (c. 1796 – 6 November 1831)
    - m. Polly Christian, grand daughter of Fletcher Christian related through Mauatua
      - Moses Young (30 September 1829 – 14 July 1909) m. Albina McCoy, granddaughter of William McCoy
  - Dorothy Young (1797 – 24 April 1863)
    - m. John Buffett, a sailor from Bristol
      - Thomas Buffett (3 January 1825 – 18 October 1900) m. 1) Louisa Quintal, granddaughter of Matthew Quintal; m. 2) Dorcas Young, granddaughter of Ned Young
      - John Buffett (21 July 1826 – 23 June 1906) m. Elizabeth Young, granddaughter of Ned Young
      - David Buffett (27 May 1827 – 7 August 1924) m. Martha Young, granddaughter of Ned Young
      - Robert Pitcairn Buffett (26 March 1830 – 23 January 1926) m. Lydia Young, granddaughter of Ned Young
      - Edward Buffett (27 November 1835 – 28 November 1911) m. Louisa Victoria Rose Quintal, great-granddaughter of Matthew Quintal
  - James Young (1799–1806)
- m. Toofaiti, a.k.a. Hutia, Nancy
  - Polly Young (c. 1794 – 17 December 1843) m. George Adams, son of John Adams (see)
  - George Young (c. 1797 – 4 May 1831)
    - m. Hannah Adams daughter of John Adams
      - George Martin Frederick Young (1822 – 25 September 1899) m. Mary Evans, granddaughter of John Adams
      - Simon Young (17 August 1823 – 26 September 1893) m. Mary Buffett Christian, great-granddaughter of Fletcher Christian
      - Dinah Young (16 November 1824 – 9 May 1881) m. John Quintal, grandson of Matthew Quintal
      - Elizabeth Young (8 September 1826 – 10 October 1863) m. John Buffett, grandson of Ned Young
      - Jemima Young (31 October 1828 – 5 May 1868) unmarried
      - Martha Young (19 January 1830 – 30 January 1872) m. David Buffett, grandson of Ned Young
  - Robert Young (c. 1799 – 18 August 1831) unmarried.
  - William Young (1799 – 6 February 1839)
    - m. Elizabeth Mills, daughter of John Mills
      - Mayhew Young (1823–1823) died at 9 months
      - Mary Polly Young (28 January 1825 – 16 June 1885) m. Thursday October Christian II, grandson of Fletcher Christian
      - William Mayhew Young (4 December 1827 – 14 October 1876) m. Margaret Christian, granddaughter of Fletcher Christian
      - Miriam Young (30 August 1829 – 25 November 1911) m. Isaac Christian, grandson of Fletcher Christian
      - Dorcas Young (16 September 1832 – 3 December 1917) m. Thomas Buffett, grandson of Ned Young
      - Lydia Young (16 September 1832 – 30 July 1883) m. 1) Daniel McCoy, grandson of William McCoy; m. 2) Robert Pitcairn Buffett, grandson of Ned Young
      - Robert Young (19 June 1837 – 18 November 1837) died as infant

- John Adams (4 July 1767 – 5 March 1829)
- m. Vahineatua, a.k.a. Bal'hadi, Prudence (unk – 29 Apr 1831); previously consort of John Mills
  - Dinah Adams (c. 1796 – 19 January 1864) m. Edward Quintal, son of Matthew Quintal (see)
  - Rachel Adams (1797 – 7 September 1876)
    - m. John Evans, a sailor from London
      - John Valentine Mansell Evans (12 January 1829 – before 1892) unmarried
      - William Evans (8 August 1830 – 3 March 1873) m. Rebecca Christian, great-granddaughter of Fletcher Christian
      - Mary Evans (17 January 1833 – 1 June 1909) m. George Martin Frederick Young, grandson of Ned Young
      - George Francis Mason Evans (23 December 1835 – 6 May 1910) m. Catherine Christian, great-granddaughter of Fletcher Christian
      - Dinah Evans (6 August 1837 – 11 June 1870) m. John Quintal, great-grandson of Matthew Quintal
      - Martha Evans (12 July 1839 – 17 September 1876) m. Joseph Quintal, grandson of Matthew Quintal
  - Hannah Adams (1799 – 27 August 1864) m. George Young, son of Ned Young
- m. Teio, a.k.a. Mary, also consort of William McCoy (unk – aft. 1825)
  - George Adams (6 June 1804 – 29 October 1873)
    - m. Polly Young daughter of Ned Young;
      - John Adams (10 November 1827 – 20 May 1897) m. Caroline Quintal, granddaughter of Matthew Quintal
      - Jonathan Adams (3 January 1829 – 23 May 1906) m. Phoebe Quintal, granddaughter of Matthew Quintal
      - Josiah Chester Adams (19 June 1830 – 2 February 1907) m. Diana McCoy, great-granddaughter of Matthew Quintal
    - m. Sarah Quintal, daughter of Matthew Quintal

- John Mills (unk. – 20 September 1793)
- m. Vahineatua; after Mills's murder, consort of John Adams
  - Elizabeth Mills (1792 – 6 November 1883) m. 1) Matthew Quintal Jr. (see); m. 2) William Young, son of Ned Young (see)
  - John Mills (1793–1814) unmarried

- William McCoy (c.1763 – 20 April 1798)
- m. Teio, a.k.a. Mary, also consort of John Adams
  - Daniel McCoy (1792 – 26 December 1832)
    - m. Sarah Quintal daughter of Matthew Quintal
      - William McCoy (1812 – 17 February 1849) unmarried
      - Daniel McCoy (1814 – 27 June 1831) m. Peggy Christian, granddaughter of Fletcher Christian
      - Hugh McCoy (1816 – 27 June 1831) unmarried
      - Matthew McCoy (1819 – 31 January 1853) m. Margaret Christian, granddaughter of Fletcher Christian
      - Jane McCoy (1822 – 4 June 1831) unmarried
      - Sarah McCoy (23 July 1824 – 9 May 1833) unmarried
      - Samuel McCoy (23 October 1826 – 7 September 1876) m. 1) Ruth Quintal, granddaughter of Matthew Quintal; m. 2) Polly Christian, great-granddaughter of Fletcher Christian
      - Albina McCoy (28 November 1828 – 12 June 1908) m. Moses Young, grandson of Ned Young
      - Daniel McCoy (28 December 1832 – 7 April 1855) m. Lydia Young, granddaughter of Ned Young
  - Catherine McCoy (1799 – 8 June 1831) m. Arthur Quintal, son of Matthew Quintal (see)

- Matthew Quintal (about 3 March 1766 – 1799)
- m. Tevarua, a.k.a. Sarah (unk – 1799)
  - Matthew Quintal Jr. (1791 – September 1814) m. Elizabeth Mills, daughter of John Mills
    - John Quintal (1812 – 14 November 1838) m. Maria Christian, granddaughter of Fletcher Christian
    - Matthew Quintal III (1814 – 8 December 1865) unmarried
  - John Quintal (1792–1792)
  - Jane Quintal (1795 – ?) left the island after she was treated harshly by her brother Arthur
  - Arthur Quintal (6 May 1795 – 19 November 1873)
    - m. Catherine McCoy daughter of William McCoy
      - Arthur Quintal II (1816 – 20 August 1902) m. Martha Quintal, granddaughter of Matthew Quintal
      - Catherine K. (Kitty) Quintal (1818 – 15 May 1831) unmarried
      - John Quintal (1820 – 2 November 1920) m. Dinah Young, granddaughter of Ned Young
      - Charlotte Quintal (1822 – 16 August 1883) m. Charles Christian, grandson of Fletcher Christian
      - Phoebe Quintal (25 April 1824 – 21 April 1900) m. Jonathan Adams, grandson of John Adams
      - James Quintal (9 July 1825 – 7 September 1898) m. Priscilla Christian, great-granddaughter of Fletcher Christian
      - Caroline Quintal (21 July 1827 – 13 June 1869) m. John Adams, grandson of John Adams
      - Ruth Quintal (8 May 1829 – 29 September 1862) m. Samuel McCoy, grandson of William McCoy
      - Lucy Anne Quintal (25 March, 25 April 1831) died as infant
    - m. Mary Christian, granddaughter of Fletcher Christian
      - Absolam Quintal (17 June 1836 – 14 June 1868) supposed to have m. Mary (surname unknown)
      - Nathaniel Quintal (7 November 1837 – 1 May 1895) m. 1) Louisa Victoria Rose Quintal, great-granddaughter of Matthew Quintal; m. 2) Abby Louisa Tabor Quintal, great-granddaughter of Matthew Quintal
      - Joseph Quintal (5 July 1839 – 26 May 1912) m. 1) Martha Evans, granddaughter of John Adams; m. 2) Lucy Emily Christian, great-great-granddaughter of Fletcher Christian
      - Cornelius Quintal (17 June 1841 – 10 February 1934) m. Ellen Amelia Moore from New Zealand
      - Mary Quintal (16 April 1843 – 5 April 1868) m. Pardon Snell of the United States
  - Sarah Quintal (1797 – 27 November 1851) m. 1) Daniel McCoy, son of William McCoy (see); m. 2) George Adams, son of John Adams (see)
- m. Teraura, a.k.a. Susan, (c. 1775 – 1850); consort of Ned Young and after his death, of Thursday October Christian
  - Edward Quintal (1800 – 8 September 1841)
    - m. Dinah Adams daughter of John Adams
      - William Quintal (1817 – 6 July 1905) m. Maria Christian, granddaughter of Fletcher Christian
      - Martha Quintal (1822 – 25 December 1893) m. Arthur Quintal, grandson of Matthew Quintal
      - Edward Quintal (31 October 1824 – 5 January 1856) unmarried
      - Abraham Blatchly Quintal (31 January 1827 – 20 September 1910) m. Esther Maria Nobbs, great-granddaughter of Fletcher Christian
      - Louisa Quintal (7 March 1829 – 5 February 1873) m. Thomas Buffett, grandson of Ned Young
      - Nancy Quintal (6 June 1831 – 24 December 1853) m. Jacob Christian, great-grandson of Fletcher Christian
      - Susan Quintal (5 November 1833 – 18 February 1917) m. Fletcher Christian Nobbs, great-grandson of Fletcher Christian
      - Henry Joshua Quintal (17 January 1836 – 16 July 1873) m. Jane McCoy, great-granddaughter of William McCoy
      - Caleb Quintal (5 September 1837 – 7 May 1873) m. Ann Naomi Nobbs, great-granddaughter of Fletcher Christian
      - Joseph Napoleon Quintal (7 December 1839 – 2 October 1841) unmarried

== Other descendants ==
- Malcolm Champion (12 November 1882 – 27 July 1939), New Zealand Olympic swimmer; his mother Sarah Clara Quintal was a descendant of Matthew Quintal.
- Thomas Colman Christian (1 November 1935 – 7 July 2013) known as the "Voice of Pitcairn" for his nearly lifelong role in keeping the island connected to the world via ham radio, died at age 77 on the island where he was born. He was a great-great-great-grandson of Fletcher Christian. In 1957, while working on a National Geographic-sponsored dive off Pitcairn, Christian helped salvage some of the sunken remains of the Bounty, including its old hull fittings. Tom was the son of Frederick Christian, grandson of Daniel Christian, great-grandson of Thursday Christian II, and great-great-grandson of Thursday October Christian, who was the son of Fletcher Christian. The cause of Tom's death was complications of a recent stroke, said his daughter Jacqueline Christian.
- Rosalind Amelia Young (13 August 1853 – 1 February 1924), historian and great-granddaughter of John Adams

The majority of the many rulers of the Pitcairn Islands have been descendants of the Bounty mutineers, till this day.

In 1935—in the wake of their successful American blockbuster movie Mutiny on the Bounty, which premiered that year—the MGM Studios also shot a short documentary with the title "Pitcairn Island Today" (a Eugene H. Roth production, narrated by Carey Wilson). It tells the story of some of the descendants of the Bounty mutineers, who were natives of Pitcairn and inhabitants of the only village of the island, Adamstown.

The list of descendants mentioned and presented in this MGM documentary includes:

- William Christian, 60–70 years old (judging by appearance), farmer, presented as "Fletcher Christians great-grandson".
- Benjamin Young, 84 years old (i.e. born around 1851), blacksmith, presented as the "great-grandson of a happy young Midshipman of the Bounty" (that would be Edward "Ned" Young).
- Edward Christian, 55–60 years old (judging by appearance), stonecutter, presumably another descendant of Fletcher Christian.
- "Pastor Christian", pastor and mayor of the island. Most likely he is to be identified as Edgar Allen Christian (at that time 52 years old, an age corresponding to his appearance in the video). Furthermore, this assumption is based on the fact that he (as seen later in the footage) appears to have signed a marriage announcement in his function of being the "Magistrate" of the island (see below). In earlier and later years, however, Edgar A. Christian's cousin Charles Richard Parkin Christian too held this double office of being both the religious leader as well as the Chief Magistrate of Pitcairn (cf. List of rulers of the Pitcairn Islands).
- (Aunt) Annie McCoy, 70–80 years old (judging by appearance), descendant of Able Seaman William McCoy.
- Rebecca Young, 12–20 years old (judging by appearance), presumably another descendant of Midshipman Ned Young.
- Allan Christian and Eva Christian, a couple (of likely young age?) whose intention of marriage is officially signed and publicly announced by "Edgar Christian – Magistrate" (during the time of shooting the documentary).
- David Young, a newborn baby (who nearly died because the doctor came by ship from abroad and almost arrived too late), yet another descendant of Midshipman Ned Young.

On top of those, three more people are mentioned in the MGM documentary: Andrew Warren (grandson of a whaler who came to Pitcairn around 1875, thus being no descendant of the mutineers), as well as Dora Warren and Roy Clark, whose exact direct descent from the mutineers (or lack of such) remains unclear, when judging only from the information that the documentary reveals.

A 1962 documentary, Pitcairn People (directed by Peter Newington, narrated by Patrick Wymark), was produced by the British Petroleum Company. It featured many of the island residents of that time. Another documentary, Miracle on Pitcairn Island, was produced in the 1960s by the General Conference of Seventh-day Adventists (filmed and written by Eric Were, narrated by Neal C. Wilson). It featured many of the same residents.
