= Brian Young (magistrate) =

Pitcairn Islands magistrate and child rapist (born 1954)

Brian Michael John Young (born 10 September 1954) served as Magistrate of the British Overseas Territory of the Pitcairn Islands from December 1984 until 1 January 1991. In 2007, Young was found guilty of rape and indecent assault, and was sentenced to six years and six months in prison.

== Career ==
Young served as a Magistrate on the Pitcairn Islands and was made Council Representative to the School Maintenance Committee in 1994. He later moved to New Zealand.

== Trial ==
During a special sitting of the Pitcairn Supreme Court in New Zealand, Young was found guilty of child sex offences during his time on the Pitcairn Islands in January 2007. Two years earlier, the 2004 Pitcairn Islands sexual assault trial had resulted in six men being found guilty on 35 charges of similar crimes. A third of the men on the island were charged during the trial and the result was said to have shocked the islanders according to the New Zealand Herald. Young was tried alongside Shawn Christian, a descendant of Bounty mutineer Fletcher Christian and a future mayor of the Pitcairn Islands. After the trial, Young was extradited to the Pitcairn Islands to be sentenced. In March 2007, Young was sentenced to six and a half years in jail by Chief Justice Charles Blackie of the Pitcairn Supreme Court. He was subsequently ordered to serve out his sentence in a prison specifically built following the sexual assault scandal on the island.

After serving two years of his sentence at the Bob's Valley Prison, Young – the last Pitcairn rape prisoner – was released on home detention in April 2009.

== Ancestry ==
Ancestors of Brian Young (magistrate)

16. Moses Young (=22)
8. Charles Carleton Vieder Young
17. Albina McCoy (=23)
4. Edwin Carlton Young
18. Alphonso Driver Christian
9. Alice Helena Christian
19. Sarah McCoy
2. Samuel Carlyle Young
20. Simon Young
10. William Alfred Young
21. Mary Buffett Christian
5. Vesta Annesly Young
22. Moses Young (=16)
11. Mercy Amelia Lawrence Young
23. Albina McCoy (=17)
1. Brian Michael John Young
24. Samuel Russell Warren
12. George Francis Chris Warren
25. Agnes Christian
6. Wallace Maynard Warren
26. Peter John Butler
13. Alice Lily Butler
27. Alice Sophia McCoy
3. Vula Valma Warren
28. William Johnstone
14. Louis Johnston
29. Maria Guilloux
7. Maria Johnston
30. Francis Hickson Christian
15. Caroline Agatha Christian
31. Eunice Jane Lawrence Young
