= Quintal (disambiguation) =

The quintal is a historical unit of mass.

Quintal may also refer to:

== Surname ==
- Anthony Quintal (born 1999), American former YouTuber known online as Lohanthony
- Arthur Quintal I (1795–1873), Pitcairn Islands politician
- Arthur Quintal II (1816–1902), Pitcairn Islands politician
- Edward Quintal (1800–1841), first magistrate of the British Overseas Territory of Pitcairn Island, son of Matthew Quintal
- John Quintal (1884–1961), Australian politician
- Mary Quintal (born 1929), Singaporean badminton player, first female police inspector in Singapore and an Assistant Superintendent of Police from 1961 to 1974
- Matthew Quintal (1766–1799), Cornish HMS Bounty mutineer
- Maurice Quintal (born 1947), Canadian airline pilot
- Miquelina Maria Possante Sardinha Quintal (1902–1966), Portuguese anarchist
- Stéphane Quintal (born 1968), Canadian retired ice hockey player

== Places ==
- Quintal, Haute-Savoie, a commune of the Haute-Savoie département in France

== See also ==
- Quintal (number), grammatical number denoting 'five items'
- Quartal and quintal harmony
- Antero de Quental (1842–1891), Portuguese poet, philosopher and writer
