= Arthur Quintal =

Arthur Quintal may refer to:

- Arthur Quintal I (1795–1873), Pitcairn Islander
- Arthur Quintal II (1816–1902), Magistrate of the Overseas British Territory of Pitcairn Island
