= Matt McCoy =

Matt or Matthew McCoy may refer to:

- Matt McCoy (actor) (born 1958), American actor
- Matt McCoy (American football) (born 1982), American football linebacker
- Matt McCoy (politician) (born 1966), Iowa State Senator
- Matt McCoy (rugby league) (1923–2007), Australian rugby league footballer
- Matthew McCoy (Magistrate) (1819–1853), Magistrate of the British Overseas Territory of Pitcairn Island, 1843 and 1853
- Matthew Edmond McCoy (1868–1929), Magistrate of the British Overseas Territory of Pitcairn Island, 1909
