= Butterworth Stavely =

Fictional character

- First appearance: "The Great Revolution in Pitcairn" (1879)
- Created by: Mark Twain

In-universe information
- Gender: Male
- Title: Emperor of Pitcairn Island.
- Occupation: adventurer, filibuster
- Nationality: American

Butterworth Stavely is a fictional character in Mark Twain's 1879 story "The Great Revolution in Pitcairn". He is an American adventurer and filibuster who instigates a coup d'état on the Pitcairn Islands and has himself crowned "Emperor Butterworth I".

Twain based his story on one sentence in a naval report by Royal Navy officer Algernon de Horsey: "One stranger, an American, has settled on the island – a doubtful acquisition", which was probably referring to Peter Butler, a survivor of the 1875 Khandeish shipwreck. The story was probably also inspired by the life of American adventurer Joshua Hill, who briefly ruled the Pitcairn Islands as a dictator in the 1830s.

In the story, Stavely rises to political power by exploiting the internal divisions and suspicions surrounding a lawsuit between Thursday October Christian II and Elizabeth Mills waged over a trespassing chicken. His machinations lead to the impeachment of the chief magistrate James Russell Nickoy, Stavely's election as magistrate, a coup d'état against the "galling English yoke", and his coronation as emperor.

Stavely's cynical manipulation of the easily corruptible islanders has been interpreted as an indictment of U.S. colonialism and the cultural imperialism of American missionaries. Stavely’s rise to power isn't just through political speech; it is through competitive religious zeal.

== See also ==
- William Walker (filibuster)
- William A. Chanler
