= Betty Christian =

Pitcairn Island politician (1942–2026)

Betty Christian (23 November 1942 – 10 March 2026) was the Communications Officer and Island Secretary of the Pitcairn Islands. Appointed by the colonial Governor, the Island Secretary is an ex officio member of the Island Council, the legislative body of Britain's last remaining Pacific colony. She previously served as an elected member of the Council in 1990 and 1993.

Christian was a sixth-generation Pitcairner. She was educated at Pulau School on Pitcairn and subsequently studied meteorology and radio telegraphy and telephony. She joined the island's communications staff in 1963, and succeeded her husband, Tom Christian (whom she married in May 1966) as Communications Officer in November 2000. The couple have four daughters, all of whom live abroad, and two grandsons.

== Role in the Pitcairn sexual assault trial ==
Christian publicly broke ranks with most of her fellow-Pitcairners over the appeal to the verdicts rendered in the Pitcairn sexual assault trial of 2004, in which six of seven defendants were convicted on various charges of rape, indecent assault, and paedophilia. With the public support of most of the island's women, including some of the alleged victims, the six are appealing their sentences, claiming that according to Polynesian culture, sexual activity at a young age is regarded as normal, and that they were not aware that such acts were illegal under British law. They are also challenging the applicability of British law to Pitcairn, saying that their ancestors had effectively renounced their British citizenship by committing an act of treason (the burning of HMS Bounty), and that the islands were never lawfully incorporated into the British Empire.

Testifying in the Pitcairn Supreme Court in Papakura, New Zealand, specially constituted for the trial with New Zealand judges, Christian rejected the claims of the defendants that, saying that islanders were well-educated, well-travelled, and well-aware of what was legal and what was not. She also maintained that the islanders had always considered themselves British, and that the territory's status as a British dependency had never been challenged until then-Mayor Steve Christian, then a defendant facing rape charges (he was later convicted), raised the matter at a United Nations decolonization conference. (The charges against him then had not been made public).

Christian dismissed the reasoning of Adrian Cook, defence lawyer for the accused, that as the persons responsible for the 1789 Mutiny on the Bounty never legally married their Tahitian companions, their children were illegitimate and assumed the nationality of their mothers. Until recent time, the islanders had never emphasized the Polynesian side of their heritage, she said. She also contradicted the defence that underage sex in Pitcairn society has always been regarded as normal. She said that the community traditionally followed values no different from any other modern society.

== Personal life and death ==
In 2008, Christian was awarded an OBE for her services to the island.

She died in New Lynn, a suburb of West Auckland, on 10 March 2026, at the age of 83.
