= Quental =

Quental is a surname. Notable people with the surname include:

- Antero de Quental (1842–1891), Portuguese poet, philosopher, and writer
- Bartolomeu de Quental (1626–1698), Portuguese Catholic priest, theologian, and preacher
- Dulce Quental (born 1960), Brazilian singer and composer
- Geórgia Quental (1939–2022), Brazilian actress and model

== See also ==
- Quintal (disambiguation)
