= Charles Carleton Vieder Young =

Chief magistrate of the Pitcairn Islands

Chief Magistrate of the Pitcairn Islands
- In office 1890–1891
- Preceded by: James Russell McCoy
- Succeeded by: Benjamin Stanley Young

Personal details
- Born: 20 April 1850 Pitcairn Island
- Died: 31 May 1941 (aged 91) Pitcairn Island
- Spouse(s): Alice Helena Christian; Mary Louisa Rose Christian
- Children: 5
- Parents: Moses Young (father); Albina McCoy (mother)

Charles Carleton Vieder Young (20 April 1850 – 31 May 1941) was the Chief Magistrate of the Pitcairn Islands from 1890 to 1891. He was born to Moses Young and Albina McCoy. He married Alice Helena Christian on 14 January 1886 at Pitcairn Island. On 13 December 1922, he married his second wife, Mary Louisa Rose Christian. He died on 31 May 1941 at the age of 91.
