= Rosalind Young =

Rosalind Young may refer to:

- Rosalind Amelia Young (1853–1924), historian from the Pitcairn Islands
- Rosalind Tanner (née Young, 1900–1992), mathematician and historian of mathematics
