= Pulau School =

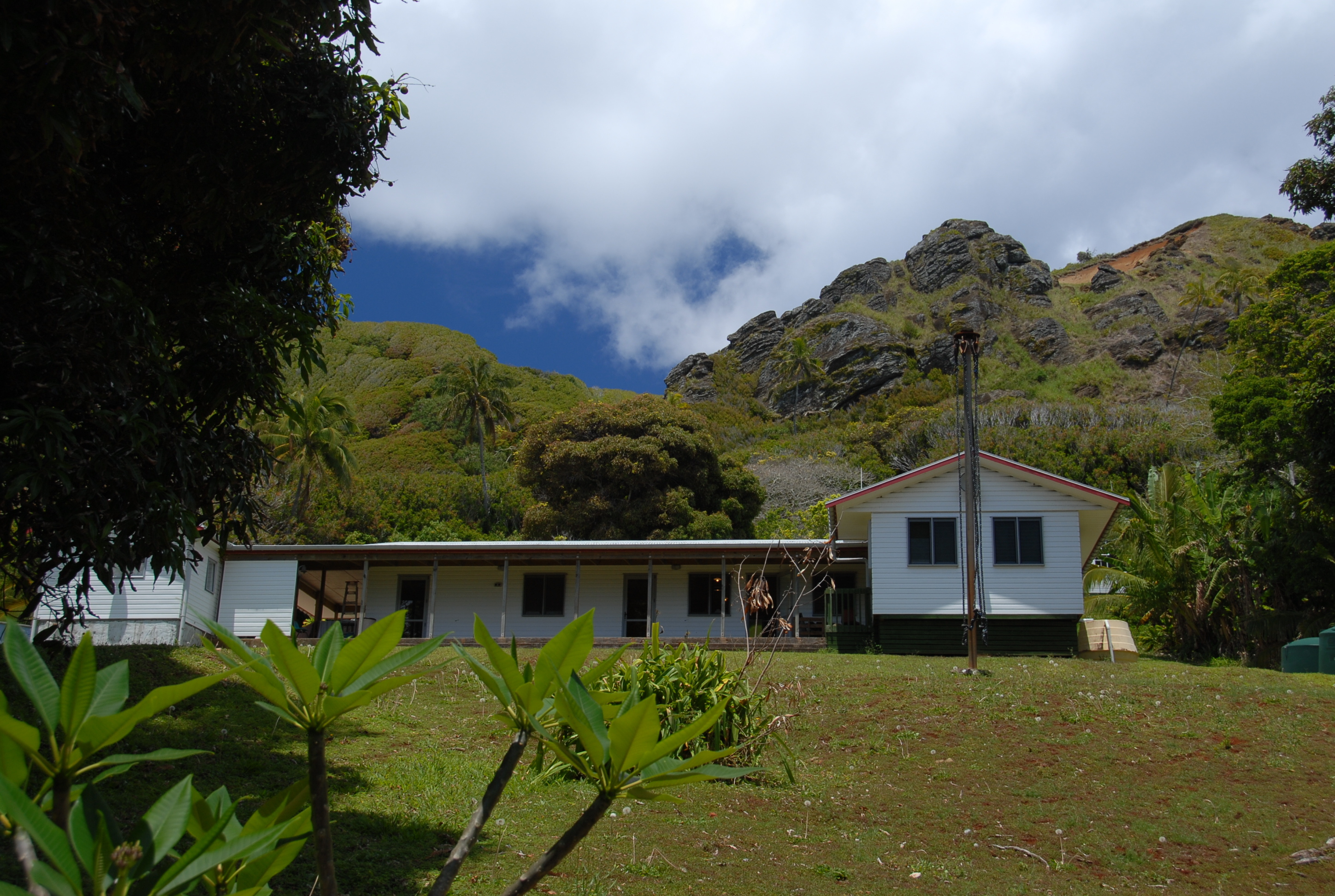

Location
- Adamstown
- Coordinates: 25°06′S 130°10′W

Information
- Type: Public primary school
- Teaching staff: 1
- Age range: 5-14
- Language: English, Pitkern

The Pulau School is the only school on the Pitcairn Islands. It is located in the capital of Adamstown and follows a modified version of the New Zealand educational curriculum, but with some changes made to promote local culture and traditions. Education in the Pitcairns is free and compulsory between the ages of five and 15. Children up to the age of 12 are taught at the school, while children of 13 and over attend secondary school in New Zealand, or are educated via correspondence school.

The students are taught by a visiting instructor who typically teaches on the island for a term of one year. The teacher is appointed by the governor from suitable qualified applicants who are registered in New Zealand as teachers. The Pulau School has a residence for teachers built in 2004.

The teacher is also considered the principal and is responsible not only for teaching, but developing the curriculum and promoting continuing education among the rest of the island's population.

The island's children have produced a book in Pitkern and English called Mi Bas Side orn Pitcairn or My Favourite Place on Pitcairn.

== History ==
The Pulau School traces its origin back to the simple curriculum taught by then magistrate Simon Young and his wife beginning in 1864. After a period of management by the Seventh-Day Adventist Church, the British government assumed responsibility for the school in 1958.

In 2004, the school was remodeled. It includes a modern classroom, computer lab and library, as well as a residence for the teacher; there was a previous residence built in 1950.

There were ten students in 1999; enrollment was previously 20 in the early 1950s, 28 in 1959, and 36 in 1962.
