= ZBP =

ZBP may refer to:

- ZBP, a radio station on Pitcairn Island, formerly operated by Tom Christian
- Zenex Blend Plant, owned by Engen Petroleum, South Africa
- Związek Banków Polskich, the national banking association of Poland, a member of European Banking Federation
- Baltimore Penn Station (IATA code: ZBP), Maryland, US
