= Richard Edgar Christian =

Chief Magistrate of Pitcairn
- In office 1926–1929
- Preceded by: Parkin Christian
- Succeeded by: Arthur Herbert Young
- In office 1935–1938
- Preceded by: Parkin Christian
- Succeeded by: Arthur Herbert Young
- In office 1940
- Preceded by: Arthur Herbert Young
- Succeeded by: David Young

Personal details
- Born: 14 August 1882; Pitcairn Island
- Died: 20 June 1940 (aged 57); Pitcairn Island

Richard Edgar Christian (14 August 1882 – 20 June 1940) was a Pitcairn Islander. He served as Chief Magistrate of Pitcairn in three spells between 1926 and 1940, and was also the island's first postmaster.

== Biography ==
Christian was born on Pitcairn Island on 14 August 1882 to Francis Hickson Christian and Eunice Jane Lawrence Young. His siblings included Parkin Christian, another Chief Magistrate. On 22 August 1907 he married Adelia Carrie Jordon McCoy, the daughter of long-serving Pitcairn leader James Russell McCoy. They had three children, Hilda, Warren and Ivan. Warren and Ivan also later served as Chief Magistrates.

Whilst serving as the island's official secretary, Christian became Pitcairn's first postmaster. Shortly after the opening of the Panama Canal in 1914, a mailbag was received from the postmaster of the Canal Zone and opened by Christian. It contained a letter stating that the Canal Zone post office would be the new central office for Pitcairn mail, and that whoever had opened the letter would be responsible for post after it arrived on Pitcairn.

Christian became Chief Magistrate for the first time on 1 January 1926, succeeding his brother Parkin. He served until 1930, when he was succeeded by Arthur Herbert Young. He began his second term in January 1935, serving until Young succeeded him again in 1939. Young remained in office for only a year before Christian started his third term at the start of 1940.

He died on 20 June 1940 on Pitcairn Island, and was succeeded as Chief Magistrate by David Young.
