= Nobbs =

Nobbs is a surname. Notable people with the surname include:

- Andre Nobbs, political figure from the Australian territory of Norfolk Island
- David Nobbs (1935–2015), English comedy writer
- George Hunn Nobbs (1799–1884), English missionary on Pitcairn Island then Norfolk Island
- Jordan Nobbs (born 1992), English footballer who plays for FA WSL club Arsenal Ladies
- Kaitlin Nobbs (born 1997), Australian field hockey player
- Keith Nobbs (born 1979), American stage, television, and film actor
- Michael Nobbs (1954–2026), Australian field hockey player and coach
- Percy Erskine Nobbs (1875–1964), Canadian architect born in Haddington, Scotland

== Fictional characters ==
- Nobby Nobbs, a character in the Discworld novels of Terry Pratchett

== See also ==
- Albert Nobbs, a 2011 drama film, directed by Rodrigo Garcia and starring actress Glenn Close, who portrays the main title's character
