= Thursday October Christian =

Thursday October Christian may refer to:

- Thursday October Christian I (1790–1831), son of Bounty mutineer Fletcher Christian and his wife Mauatua
- Thursday October Christian II (1820–1911), his son, magistrate of Pitcairn Island
