= Arthur Herbert Young =

Pitcairn Islander magistrate

Chief Magistrate of Pitcairn
- In office 1907
- Preceded by: James Russell McCoy
- Succeeded by: William Alfred Young
- In office 1930–1931
- Preceded by: Richard Edgar Christian
- Succeeded by: Edgar Allen Christian
- In office 1939
- Preceded by: Richard Edgar Christian
- Succeeded by: Richard Edgar Christian
- In office 1941
- Preceded by: David Young
- Succeeded by: Frederick Martin Christian

Personal details
- Born: 4 July 1873 Pitcairn Island
- Died: 1 July 1943 (aged 69) Pitcairn Island

Arthur Herbert Young (4 July 1873 – 1 July 1943) was a Pitcairn Islander. He served as Chief Magistrate of Pitcairn in four spells between 1907 and 1941.

== Biography ==
Young was born on Pitcairn Island on 4 July 1873, the thirteenth and final child of Simon Young and Mary Buffett Christian. His siblings included Benjamin Stanley Young, William Alfred Young and the historian Rosalind Amelia Young.

He married Adella Schmidt after meeting her in the Gambier Islands, and the couple had six children.

In 1897 he was elected to the Island Council for part of the year. In 1900 he served as one of the two judges, and in 1904 he was a member of the Internal Committee. In 1907 he was appointed Chief Magistrate for the first time. The following year he served as a member of the External Committee, and in 1910 he was a member of the Internal Committee. He served as one of the two Assessors and on the Internal Committee in 1912. In 1922 he was Chairman of the Committee.

In 1930 he was appointed Chief Magistrate for a second time, serving for two years. He held the office again in 1939 and 1941, also serving as Assessor in 1938.

He died on Pitcairn on 1 July 1943.
