= Robert Pitcairn Buffett =

Chief magistrate of the Pitcairn Islands

Chief Magistrate of the Pitcairn Islands
- In office 1868
- Preceded by: Thursday October Christian II
- Succeeded by: Moses Young

Personal details
- Born: 26 March 1830 Pitcairn Island
- Died: 2 January 1916 (aged 85) Pitcairn Island
- Spouse: Lydia Young
- Parents: John Buffett (father); Dorothy Young (mother)

Robert Pitcairn Buffett (26 March 1830 – 2 January 1916) was the Chief Magistrate of the Pitcairn Islands in 1868.

Robert Pitcairn Buffet was born on 26 March 1830 to John Buffett and Dorothy Young. He married twice, Lydia Young on 7 December 1862, and Mary Elizabeth Young in September 1896. He died on 2 January 1916 and was buried on Pitcairn Island on 23 January 1916.
