= Andrew Clarence David Young =

Chief Magistrate of the Pitcairn Islands

Chief Magistrate of the Pitcairn Islands
- In office 1940
- Preceded by: Richard Edgar Christian
- Succeeded by: Arthur Herbert Young

Personal details
- Born: 15 April 1899 Pitcairn Islands
- Died: 18 March 1988 (aged 88) Pitcairn Islands
- Spouse: Catherine Almira Warren
- Children: Verna Carlene Deborah "Dobrey" Christian
- Parents: David Andrew Young (father); Katherine "Kittie" Young (mother)

Andrew Clarence David Young (15 April 1899 – 18 March 1988) was a Pitcairn Islander. He served as Chief Magistrate of the Pitcairn Islands in 1940.

Andrew Young was born to Katherine "Kittie" and David Andrew Young. He married Catherine "Katie" Almira Warren in 1921 and had a daughter, Verna Carlene Deborah "Dobrey" on 23 January 1923. He became interested in radio in 1921, and operated the first wireless radio set on Pitcairn. He operated the island's first radio station at Taro Ground between 1948 and 1955.

In May 1947, he took part in the rescue of 23 men whose boat had capsized. He was also credited with helping to save a different voyage from Henderson Island in January 1959. The boat was caught in heavy winds and, given that the rest of crew had contracted Asian flu, he navigated the boat back to Pitcairn.
