= Warren Clive Christian =

Magistrate of Pitcairn Island (1914-2003)

Warren Clive Christian (17 August 1914 - 19 January 2003) served as Magistrate of the British Overseas Territory of Pitcairn Island twice, in 1950-51 and 1958-60. Christian was the son of Richard Edgar Christian and Adelia Carrie Jordan McCoy. He is related to numerous other island leaders, notably grandfather James Russell McCoy, uncles Charles Richard Parkin Christian and Matthew Edmond McCoy, brother Ivan Christian, and nephew and niece, Steve Christian and Brenda Christian.
