= Copacabana Palace (film) =

1962 film by Steno and Vincenzoni

- Directed by: Steno
- Written by: Luciano Vincenzoni
- Produced by: Livio Bruni; Franco Cancellieri; Francisco Lorente; Abilio Pereira de Almeida; Paulo Sá Pinto; Francisco Verde
- Starring: Walter Chiari; Mylène Demongeot; Franco Fabrizi
- Cinematography: Massimo Dallamano
- Edited by: Wallace Simonsen
- Music by: Gianni Ferrio
- Production companies: Consórcio Paulista de Co-Produção; France Cinéma Productions; Ital-Victoria Films
- Release date: 4 November 1962
- Running time: 90 minutes
- Countries: Brazil; France; Italy
- Language: Italian

Copacabana Palace is an Italian comedy film from 1962, directed by Steno, written by Luciano Vincenzoni, starring Walter Chiari, Mylène Demongeot and Franco Fabrizi.

== Music ==
Antônio Carlos Jobim wrote "Samba do Avião" for this film, where it was performed by Jula De Palma and I 4 + 4 di Nora Orlandi. The movie was filmed in Rio de Janeiro and features cameo appearances by Jobim, João Gilberto and Os Cariocas.

The first performance of the song was by Jobim and Os Cariocas in August 1962 at the Au Bon Gourmet restaurant in Copacabana, Rio de Janeiro, as it featured Jobim, João Gilberto, Vinícius de Moraes and Os Cariocas on stage together for the only time.

== Cast ==
- Walter Chiari : Ugo
- Mylène Demongeot : Zina von Raunacher
- Franco Fabrizi
- Sylva Koscina : Ines
- Luiz Bonfá : himself
- João Gilberto : himself
- Antônio Carlos Jobim : himself
- Tonia Carrero : Mrs.Lopez
- Dóris Monteiro : Maria
- Geórgia Quental
