= George Martin Frederick Young =

Pitcairn Islands magistrate (1822–1909)

Chief Magistrate of the Pitcairn Islands
- In office 1855–1856
- Preceded by: Arthur Quintal II
- Succeeded by: Thursday October Christian II

Chief Magistrate of Norfolk Island
- In office 1856–1857

Chief Magistrate of Norfolk Island
- In office 1859

Personal details
- Born: 1822 Pitcairn Islands
- Died: 1 June 1909 (aged 86–87) Norfolk Island
- Spouse: Mary Evans
- Children: 14
- Parents: George Young (father); Hannah Adams (mother)

George Martin Frederick Young (1822 – 1 June 1909) was the Chief Magistrate of the Pitcairn Islands from 1855 to 1856 and Chief Magistrate of Norfolk Island from 1856 till 1857 and in 1859.

He married Mary Evans, the daughter of John Evans and Rachael Adams, in 1849.

== Children ==
George Martin Frederick Young had several children with Mary Evans:

Name	Date of birth	Date of death
Robert Charles Grant Young	18 September 1850	2 May 1860
John Forrester Young	13 June 1852	17 November 1913
Emily Rachael Young	26 December 1854	27 July 1930
Frederick Young	4 October 1856	19 March 1860
William Alfred Denison Young	22 April 1858	
Frederick Richmond Young		
Mary Catherine Young		
George Henry Young	1 October 1864	23 March 1896
Ellen Young	10 November 1866	
Charlotte Young	29 August 1869	11 December 1878
Eleanor Bathie Young		
Robert Young	10 September 1876	18 September 1876
Robert Young	1877	9 May 1912
Charles Young	20 July 1878	9 February 1887
