= Francisco Montalvo y Ambulodi =

Spanish soldier, colonial administrator and politician

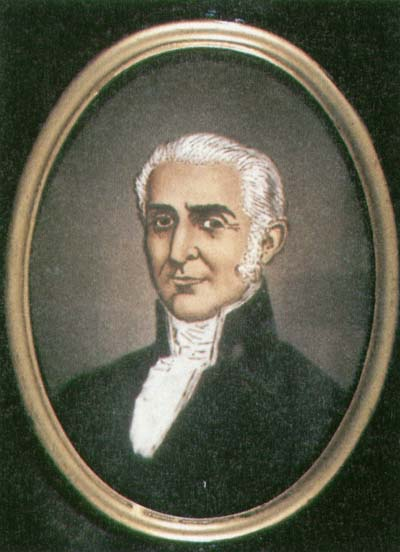
Francisco Montalvo y Ambulodi, Viceroy of New Granada

Francisco José Montalvo y Ambulodi Arriola y Casabant Valdespino (1754 in Havana – 1822 in Madrid) was a Spanish soldier, colonial administrator and politician. From May 30, 1813, to April 16, 1816, he was governor and captain-general of New Granada (Colombia, Panama, Venezuela and Ecuador), and from April 16, 1816, to March 9, 1818, he was viceroy of the colony. During his terms of office, New Granada was in open revolt against Spain.

== Early life ==
Montalvo was a Criollo (a Spaniard born in America). He entered the army in Spain in his youth, served in South America and Santo Domingo, and was rapidly promoted. In 1795, he was promoted to brigadier. He was a knight of the Order of Santiago.

== As governor and viceroy of New Granada ==
On May 30, 1813, Montalvo took office as governor (jefe político superior) and captain general of New Granada, as well as president of the Audiencia, replacing Benito Pérez Brito. His headquarters were in Santa Marta, since the capital was under rebel control. He arrived aboard the Spanish brig El Borja. Because the viceregal office had been abolished by the Spanish Constitution of 1812, he did not formally have the title of viceroy until 1816, when Ferdinand VII abolished the Constitution. Nevertheless, he was the highest-ranking Spanish colonial administrator in the colony. In 1815, he was promoted to lieutenant general.

He offered the city of Cartagena an alliance against Simón Bolívar, but this was rejected. On February 15, 1816, he reconquered the city for Spain. On February 24, under his orders, 44 patriots of Cartagena were executed. On April 9, 1816, he announced an amnesty. According to his account, the Spaniards executed 7,000 patriots in the viceroyalty during the reconquest. On April 16, 1816, he was promoted to viceroy.

== Later career ==
He was succeeded as viceroy in 1818 by Juan José de Sámano y Uribarri and returned to Spain, where he served as a councilor of state until his death.

Government offices
Preceded by Benito Pérez Brito	Viceroy of New Granada; 1816–1818	Succeeded by Juan José de Sámano y Uribarri
