= Geórgia Quental =

Brazilian actress and model (1939–2022)

- Born: 23 April 1939; Porto Alegre, Rio Grande do Sul, Brazil
- Died: 19 November 2022 (aged 83)
- Occupations: Actress and model

Geórgia Quental (23 April 1939 – 19 November 2022) was a Brazilian actress and model.

== Early life ==
Geórgia Quental was born in Porto Alegre, but her family moved to Rio de Janeiro when she was a baby.

== Career ==
Quental first worked as a model and in advertisements. She won the title of Miss Rio Grande do Norte in 1962.

She made her television debut in 1959, appearing on Brazilian singer Cauby Peixoto's program on TV Continental.

Quental appeared in many prestigious Brazilian telenovelas, including TV Globo's Sangue e Areia (1967–1968), A Grande Família (1972), and Jogo da Vida (1981).

She acted in twelve films, including Copacabana Palace (1962), Boca de Ouro (1963) alongside Jece Valadão, and Com as Calças na Mão with Carlo Mossy (1976).

Her final television appearance was in the 1991 telenovela Araponga.

== Personal life and death ==
Geórgia Quental died on 19 November 2022, at the age of 83.

== Partial filmography ==
- Copacabana Palace (1962)
- Boca de Ouro (1963)
- Un Ramo para Luíza (1954)
- Carnaval Barra Limpa (1967)
- Com as Calças na Mão (1976)
