= Abraham Blatchly Quintal =

Chief magistrate of the Pitcairn Islands

Chief Magistrate of the Pitcairn Islands
- In office 1852
- Preceded by: Thursday October Christian II
- Succeeded by: Matthew McCoy

Personal details
- Born: 31 January 1827 Pitcairn Islands
- Died: 20 September 1910 (aged 83) Norfolk Island
- Spouse: Esther Maria Nobbs
- Children: 12
- Parents: Edward Quintal (father); Dinah Adams (mother)

Abraham Blatchly Quintal (31 January 1827 – 20 September 1910) was chief magistrate of the Pitcairn Islands in 1852. On 25 December 1848, he married Esther Maria Nobbs, who was sixteen at the time.

== Children ==
Abraham Blatchly Quintal and his wife Esther Maria Nobbs had several children:

Name	Date of birth	Date of death
Fairfax Moresby Mitchell Quintal	31 July 1851	after 1910
John Moresby Acland Quintal	28 June 1853	after 1910
Henry Stephen Fremantle Quintal	5 March 1856	21 September 1907
Harriett Thomasa Leonora Quintal	2 February 1858	3 May 1860
Gustave Adolf Krisman Quintal	25 November 1859	
Charles Grant Quintal		
Mary Louise Anne Quintal	4 April 1865	6 May 1866
Sarah Eunice Quintal	3 December 1866	1926
Eleanor Quintal		
Jemima Louisa Quintal		
Walter Halliday Quintal		
Emily Quintal		
