= Benito Pérez Brito =

Spanish military officer and colonial official

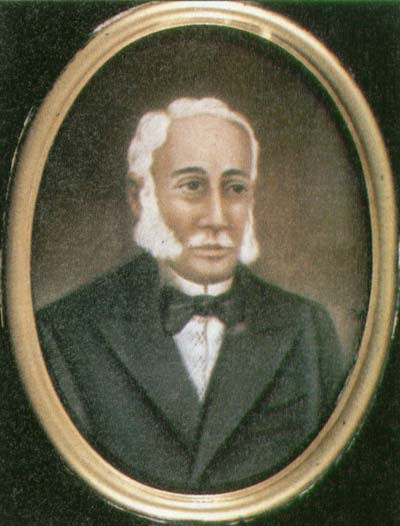
Benito Pérez Brito, Viceroy of New Granada (1812-13)

Benito Pérez Brito de los Ríos y Fernández Valdelomar (1747 in Barcelona – August 3, 1813 in Panama City) was a Spanish military officer and colonial official. From March 21, 1812 to November 1812, he was viceroy of New Granada.

== Background ==
Pérez entered the military in 1762 as a cadet in the Regiment of Navarre. He held various posts in America, among them lieutenant of the king in Puerto Rico and in Havana. After the Siege of San Juan in 1797, Perez was recommended by Captain General of Puerto Rico, Ramon de Castro, for the rank of Field Marshal, which the Viceroy of New Spain, Miguel Jose de Avanza, promoted him. Thereafter he was named captain general and intendant of Yucatán, a post that he occupied from 1800 to 1811.

== As viceroy of New Granada ==
In August 1810 he was named viceroy of New Granada to replace Francisco Javier Venegas (who had never actually occupied the position). He stopped first in Mérida, Yucatán and Havana to gather resources for the reconquest of Cartagena, which was in rebel hands. He made his capital at Portobelo in Panama, because the capital of the viceroyalty, Bogotá, was also held by rebels. He arrived in Portobelo on February 19, 1812, without bringing any military reinforcements.

He established the Audiencia of Bogotá in Panama (February 21, 1812). The following March 21 he was sworn in as viceroy. He tried to aid the royalists of Santa Marta.

Pérez resigned the viceroyalty in November 1812 under pressure from the Spanish government in Cádiz, which required him to resign nearer to Bogotá. He died in Panama on August 3, 1813. Four days later rebel Simón Bolívar made his triumphal entry into Caracas, his native city, reestablishing the Venezuelan Republic.

Government offices
Preceded by Francisco Javier Venegas	Viceroy of New Granada; 1812–1813	Succeeded by Francisco Montalvo y Ambulodi
