= Rosalind Amelia Young =

Pitcairn Islands historian (1853–1924)

- Born: August 13, 1853; Pitcairn Islands
- Died: February 1, 1924 (aged 70); Pitcairn Islands
- Spouse: David Nield
- Writing career
- Genre: History
- Notable works: Mutiny of the Bounty and Story of Pitcairn Island (1790–1894)

Rosalind Amelia Young (13 August 1853 – 1 February 1924) was a historian from Pitcairn Islands.

== Early life ==
Young was born in 1853 on Pitcairn Island to Simon Young and Mary Buffett Christian. She was also the great-granddaughter of John Adams, one of the mutineers of HMS Bounty. His siblings included William Alfred Young, Arthur Herbert Young, and Benjamin Stanley Young.

As a young child she was part of a migration to Norfolk Island but returned in 1864. Her father led the return of several families to the Pitcairn Islands and became magistrate in 1849.

== Career ==
From a young age she began recording the history of the Pitcairn Islands, specifically that of Elizabeth Mills, daughter of a Bounty mutineer. She shared the history of the islands through letters, collecting historical information and personal stories. She also began writing articles about the islands and worked as a primary schoolteacher.

In 1894 she published a comprehensive history of Pitcairn Islands in the book Mutiny of the Bounty and Story of Pitcairn Island (1790–1894). Since its original publication, the book has been reprinted several times. The book is one of the few documentations of the islands' history and drew upon the direct experiences of several generations of islanders, including those of HMS Bounty.

Young was also a poet and composed the words to several songs which are still played on Pitcairn Islands.

== Legacy ==
In 2017, five stamps were created in her honour, as part of the 'Prominent Pitcairners' series, and were on sale from 22 February 2017 (for a period of two years).

== Publications ==
Young's books include

- Mutiny of the Bounty and Story of Pitcairn Island 1790-1894 (1894)
- The Mutiny on the Bounty: Texts from Captain Bligh, Sir John Barrow, and Amelia Rosalind Young

== Personal life ==
Young married Pastor David Nield, a New Zealander, on 27 November 1907 in Auckland, New Zealand. She died on 1 February 1924 on Pitcairn Island.
