= Miquelina Maria Possante Sardinha Quintal =

Portuguese anarchist

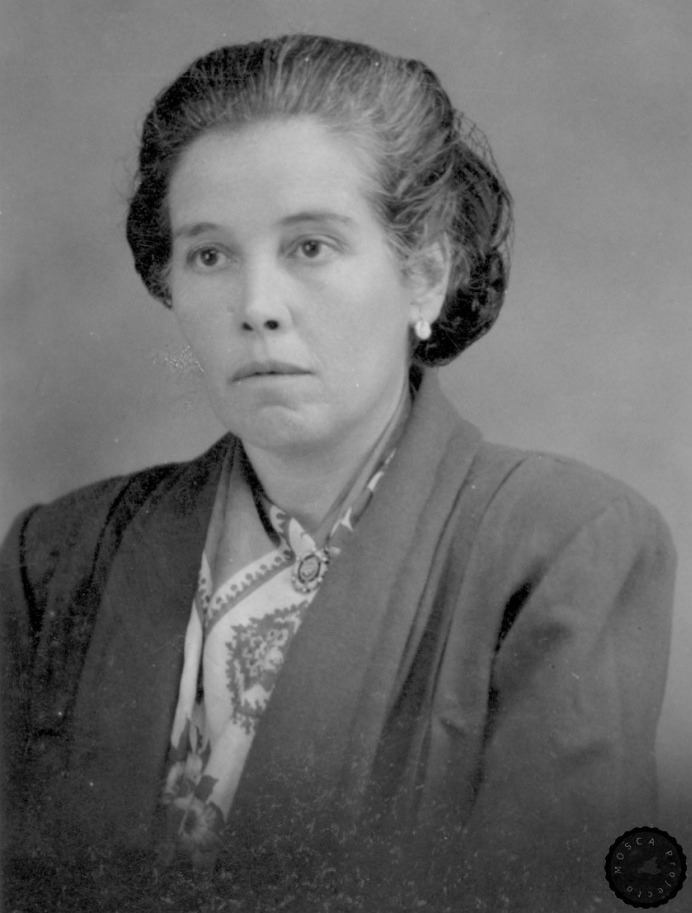
- Born: Miquelina Maria Possante Sardinha; 11 November 1902; Avis, Portalegre District, Portugal
- Died: 27 October 1966 (aged 63)
- Occupation: Teacher
- Known for: Anarchism
- Movement: Anarcho-syndicalism
- Spouse: Francisco Nóbrega Quintal

Miquelina Maria Possante Sardinha Quintal (1902–1966) was a Portuguese anarchist.

== Early life ==
Quintal was born as Miquelina Maria Possante Sardinha in the municipality of Avis in the Portalegre District of Portugal, on 11 November 1902. She was the daughter of Manuel dos Santos Sardinha, a carpenter, who had Republican sympathies. When she was a child, her parents moved to Ponte de Sôr in the same district, where her father joined a group of anarchists who shared his secular and libertarian views. The family home served as the headquarters of the Sindicato Único da Construção Civil (Civil Construction Union) of Ponte de Sôr. From an early age, Quintal met influential anarchist figures that the family received during conferences held in the region. She also collaborated in the task of selling the Anarcho-syndicalist newspaper A Batalha (The Battle) and the anarchist magazine A Comuna (The Commune), as well as with the distribution of manifestos to disseminate anarchist thought. Later, she would become secretary of the anarchists' union in the town, and a public speaker on its behalf.

Quintal joined the anarcho-syndicalist Federação dos Trabalhadores Rurais de Portugal (Federation of Rural Workers of Portugal). Under the influence of Vitória Pais Freire de Andrade, a teacher in Ponte de Sôr, who was known as a libertarian and a campaigner against bullfighting, she embarked on a career as a primary teacher at a free school for children and adults. These schools, which followed the approach to education developed by the Spanish anarchist, Francisco Ferrer, were linked to the trade unions and were intended primarily for the education of poor children, who also received food and clothing and, sometimes, accommodation. With the school being accused of using a teaching method contrary to that supported by the Catholic Church and the State, the municipality of Ponte de Sôr ordered its closure in 1924. It was only reopened as a result of the intervention of the poet João de Barros, then secretary general of the Ministry of Education.

== Marriage and later life ==
On 5 November 1925, Quintal married Francisco Nóbrega Quintal (1898–1987) at a civil ceremony. He was a libertarian activist, who was director of the newspaper A Voz Anarquista (The Anarchist Voice), and a supporter of moves to get Portuguese and Spanish anarchists to work more closely together. A 1925 photo exists of the young couple and their baby with 25 other anarchists attending a meeting. Miquelina Quintal is the only woman present. Her husband attended the founding conference of the Federación Anarquista Ibérica (Iberian Anarchist Federation), which took place in Valencia in Spain in 1927 but, on his return, was arrested and sent to a prison camp in Angola, where he was kept until 1929. Later, the couple moved to Lisbon, and Quintal started teaching at the school of the Civil Construction Union. With her husband, she continued anarchist propaganda until the end of her life. She contributed to A Batalha, denouncing the persecutions of anarchists and the brutality of the GNR, the military police force.

== Death ==
Quintal died on 27 October 1966. She remained anticlerical and an atheist throughout her life.
