= Tom Christian =

Pitcairn Islander radio operator (1935–2013)

Tom Christian MBE
- Christian, one of the leaders of the Pitcairn Island community, descended from Royal Navy deserters and Polynesian women
- Born: 1 November 1935; Pitcairn Island
- Died: 7 July 2013 (aged 77); Pitcairn Island
- Occupation: Radio operator
- Known for: The "voice of Pitcairn"

Tom Christian MBE (1 November 1935 – 7 July 2013) was a citizen of Pitcairn Island, and was its long-serving radio operator. During his lifetime, Christian was profiled in a number of publications, including National Geographic and People magazines.

Christian served as the Governor's appointee on the Pitcairn council for forty years. In 1983, Christian was appointed a member of the Order of the British Empire.

When Christian was 17, he left the island for New Zealand and stayed for three years, where he was trained to operate the radio station ZBP, first set up by the New Zealand military during World War II. In 1989, according to People magazine, Christian was the highest paid native islander, earning $10,000 a year.

The Telegraph reported that Christian had spent other relatively brief periods off-island, that he had always been attracted to life off-island, and never expected to stay on the island so long. Christian, like most Pitcairn Islanders, was a follower of Seventh-day Adventism, and worked for six months at a Seventh-day Adventist radio station in California. He also made several cruises as a radio operator on a freighter vessel. In later years, Christian visited the outside world where he delivered lectures on Pitcairn and its history.

Christian was described as one of the two most sought after amateur radio operators in the world. Christian, with call sign VP6TC/VR6TC, served as "the voice of Pitcairn" from the mid-1950s to his retirement in 2004. His radio hut was atop Spyglass Hill, which, at 870 feet (270 m) elevation, is the highest point on the island.

According to his New York Times obituary, Christian and his wife Betty Christian took a firm stance during the Pitcairn sexual assault trial of 2004 against the idea that Polynesian people had different standards about the sexual initiation of minors.

Christian died aged 77 in 2013, from the after-effects of a stroke. He and Betty had four daughters. According to the American Radio Relay League, he had been diagnosed as suffering from Alzheimer's disease in 2009, and his health and awareness of his surroundings had steadily deteriorated since then.
