= William Alfred Young =

Pitcairn Island politician (1863–1911)

William Alfred Young (4 April 1863 – 1 July 1911) served as President of the council, and Magistrate of the British Overseas Territory of Pitcairn Island three times, between 1897 and 1908. Young was the son of Simon Young and the younger brother of Benjamin Stanley Young, both had held the office before him. He was also the brother of Arthur Herbert Young, and the historian Rosalind Amelia Young.

Young married Mercy Amelia Lawrence Young, the daughter of Moses Young who had held the office of Magistrate multiple times.
