= Joshua Hill (Pitcairn Island leader) =

Pitcairn Island politician

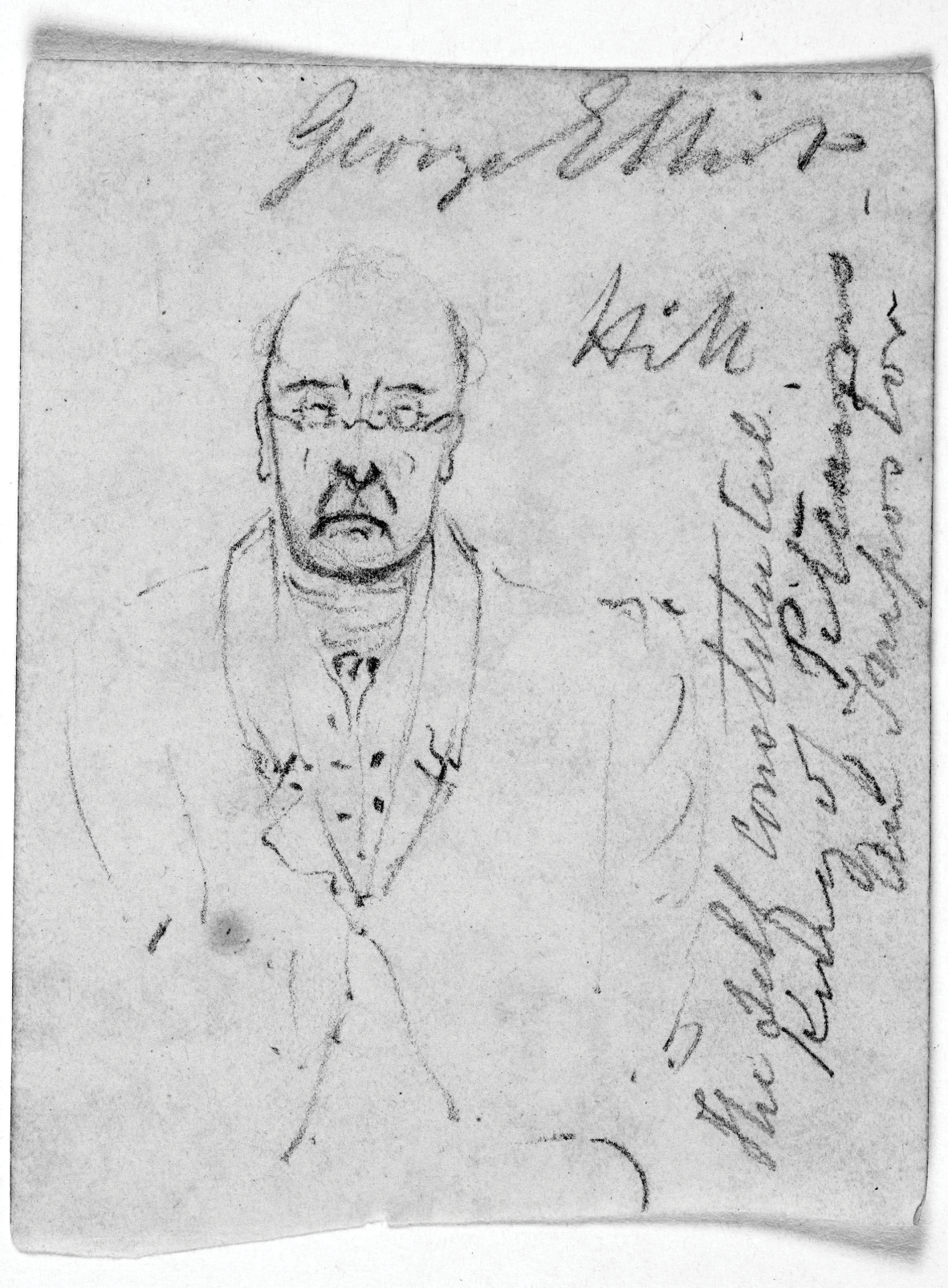
1838 sketch of Joshua Hill

Joshua W. Hill (15 April 1773 – 1844?) was an American adventurer. In 1832 he arrived on Pitcairn Island which was first inhabited in the 1790s by British mutineers from HMS Bounty and some Tahitians who joined them. The descendants of the mutineers had chosen to migrate back to Tahiti following the death of the last mutineer, John Adams, but had recently returned. Hill, taking advantage of the instability, was able to be elected President of the island. He served in that position until 1838. His rule became increasingly tyrannical, and he began imprisoning many of the island's inhabitants. He was deposed and driven off the island in 1838, and the descendants of the original inhabitants took control of the island again.

== Early life ==
Not much is known of Hill's background before he moved to the Pitcairn Islands. He claimed he was born on 15 April 1773 in British North America to a Loyalist father, whom lost everything in the American Revolution, though there is no evidence to confirm this. It is documented that Hill had travelled the world and had dined at Brighton Pavilion with The Prince Regent and his brother Prince William (the future Kings George IV and William IV) in 1817. Hill later became fascinated by romantic depictions of the mutiny on the Bounty and of the Pitcairn Islands.

== Pitcairn Islands ==
In 1832, Hill petitioned the London Missionary Society to be sent to the Pitcairn Islands as a missionary and also petitioned the British government to be sent there, with both refusing to send him. Hill went there on his own accord. When he arrived, he falsely declared to the Pitcairn Islanders that he had been sent by the British government to formalise their status as a Crown Colony. When the Islanders accepted his false documents, he declared the Pitcairn Islands a "Commonwealth". Hill created a system of government whereby the former 3 man Bench of Elders was reconstituted into a body of a Privy Council made up of Elders appointed by him, with Hill appointing himself as President of the Pitcairn Islands.

Hill often dictatorially created laws for the territory based on his personal views. He banned the distillation or consumption of alcohol and ordered a prison to be constructed. He particularly targeted British immigrants George Hunn Nobbs, the teacher and pastor for the islands, John Buffett and John Evans. Hill viewed them as "lousy foreigners" and passed laws restricting their children from inheriting and arbitrarily punished them with floggings for minor indiscretions, to the point whereby they left the islands for Tahiti.

Hill's tenure as President ended in 1837 after a confrontation during a church service. During the service, Hill threatened the daughter of Arthur Quintal with the death penalty for stealing yams with Arthur standing up to Hill. Hill drew his sword during the argument and injured Quintal before the church members disarmed Hill. The British government had been made aware of Hill's actions by Nobbs and sent a Royal Navy ship to have him removed from the island, with Nobbs, Buffet and Evans returning. In 1838, HMS Actaeon arrived to remove Hill from the Pitcairn Islands with Captain Lord Edward Russell recommending an appropriately appointed British official be appointed to govern the islanders.

Hill was probably the basis for the character Butterworth Stavely in Mark Twain's short story The Great Revolution in Pitcairn.

== Other sources ==
- "Joshua Hill, the Self-Instituted King of Pitcairn: Separating the Truth from the Lies" 2012 lecture by Tillman Nechtman, PhD - YouTube
- Nechtman, Tillman (2018). The Pretender of Pitcairn Island: Joshua W. Hill – The Man Who Would Be King Among the Bounty Mutineers. Cambridge, UK: Cambridge University Press. ISBN 978-1108440806.
