= Matthew Edmond McCoy =

Matthew Edmond McCoy (2 June 1868 – December 1929) served as Magistrate of the British Overseas Territory of Pitcairn Island in 1909. He was the son of James Russell McCoy and Eliza Coffin Palmer Young, and was the grandson of Matthew McCoy. He was one of the last people on the island with the surname 'McCoy'; most people with this name had emigrated to Norfolk Island, New Zealand or Australia, and the family produced a lot of daughters. McCoy himself had 3 children by 3 women, he had two sons who took the surnames 'Christian' and 'Young'.
