= George Hunn Nobbs =

Irish missionary to Pitcairn and Norfolk Islands (1799–1884)

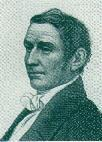
- George Hunn Nobbs (from an engraving by H. Adlard)
- Born: 16 October 1799; Norfolk, England Great Britain
- Died: 5 November 1884; Norfolk Island, British Empire
- Occupations: missionary, schoolmaster
- Spouse(s): Sarah Christian, granddaughter of Fletcher Christian
- Children: 12
- Parent(s): James Smith; Jemima Hunn

George Hunn Nobbs (16 October 1799 – 5 November 1884) baptised George Hunn was an English missionary on Pitcairn Island and later Norfolk Island, where many of his descendants still live today.

== Early life in England ==
Nobbs wrote in a letter dated August 1852 that he was the illegitimate son of an aristocratic father and mother. In reality, he was the illegitimate son of Jemima Hunn of Runham, Norfolk, England and James Smith of Filby, Norfolk, England, both from working-class families. Hunn, as a young pregnant woman, made a claim on Smith in bastardy. This was Smith's second bastardy claim of 1799 and he agreed to pay £30 to settle both. The Guardians' minute books for Norfolk's East and West Flegg for 24 September 1799 record:

The present Committee attending agreed last Tuesday with James Smith of Filby for £30 in full for a Composition of Bastardy in the Birth education and maintenance of the child or children of which Jemima Hunn is now pregnant with and has charged him the said James Smith before William Taylor Esqr, one of his Majesty's Justices of the Peace for the said County [Norfolk] to be the Father of the child or children which she now goes with and also for a child which Mary Hemblington of Filby has sworn herself to be with child by him the said James Smith and which said £30 is in full of all demands on him or hereafter to be made on account of his being considered the father of the said bastard child or children of which the said Jemima Hunn now goes with and also for the child of the said Mary Hemblington of which she was delivered on the [no date] day of September instant.

=== Baptism and family ===
Nobbs was baptised in the parish church of Runham on 27 October 1799. When he was eight months old, his mother married John Nobbs. Their marriage licence, taken out at Ormesby, Norfolk and dated 30 June 1800 stated that Nobbs was a bachelor of Great Yarmouth employed as a mariner (and later a schoolmaster) and that Hunn a single woman of Runham. They married on 3 July 1800 in Runham. Hunn and John Nobbs had two daughters after their marriage, Charlotte (baptised in 1801) and Jemima (baptised in 1802).

In 1811, Nobb's maternal grandmother's will named him as "George Nobbs Hunn." As an adult, he took his stepfather's surname and became "George Hunn Nobbs." Nobbs may have invented an aristocratic birth, albeit illegitimate, to impress the islanders. He spent his youth serving aboard various merchant ships, visiting both India and Africa.

== Missionary work in the colonies ==
In 1828, he arrived on Pitcairn Island, where he became a schoolmaster and unordained parson to a community that was descended from HMS Bounty mutineers and Tahitian islanders. On 18 October 1829, Nobbs married Sarah Christian, the granddaughter of Fletcher Christian, who had led the mutiny. Nobbs left the island for a time during the rule of Joshua Hill; he returned when Hill was expelled in 1837 and became the leader of the community himself.

He greatly impressed Rear Admiral Sir Fairfax Moresby, who visited the island in 1852. Moresby supported an application by Nobbs to be sanctioned in his position. Nobbs sailed with Moresby to Valparaíso, Chile then continued onward to London, arriving in October 1852. During his two-month visit to England he was ordained as a minister in the Colonies, was accredited by the Society for the Propagation of the Gospel with an annual stipend of £50, addressed the first meeting of the Pitcairn Fund Committee, and was received by Queen Victoria and Prince Albert at Osborne House. He set sail on his return voyage to Pitcairn on 17 December 1852.

While in London, Nobbs had convinced his supporters that the island could no longer support the Pitcairn community and on his return, he found the islanders badly affected by a prolonged drought and an outbreak of influenza. In 1856, the community moved to Norfolk Island, a crown colony previously occupied by convict prisoners. Much of the island had been cultivated, with roads and houses awaiting occupants. However, the islanders felt they could no longer continue in the same seclusion they had experienced on Pitcairn. Nobbs expressed their disappointment in a letter he wrote to Sir Fairfax Moresby in 1866: "We own nothing beyond our 50-acre (0.20 km^{2}) allotments, not sheep, nor ground on which the sheep feed; all is Government property and may be best disposed of as seems best to Government." The Melanesian Mission claimed ecclesiastical jurisdiction of the island. After a period of intransigence, Nobbs was eventually reconciled and accepted the work of the mission on the island.

When Nobbs died on 5 November 1884, most of the island community (around 470 people) attended his funeral.

== Children ==
Nobbs and Sarah Christian had 12 children and are said to have many descendants living in the Australasian area.

1. Reuben Elias Nobbs (19 September 1830 – 2 March 1855) – unmarried
2. Esther Maria Nobbs (30 August 1832 – 23 July 1910) – married Abraham Blatchly Quintal, grandson of Matthew Quintal, 12 children
3. Fletcher Christian Nobbs (1 September 1833 – 3 March 1912) – married Susan Quintal, granddaughter of Matthew Quintal, 9 children
4. Francis Mason Nobbs (7 September 1835 – 15 June 1909) – married Harriett Augusta Quintal, great-granddaughter of Matthew Quintal, 11 children
5. Jane Agnes Nobbs (6 October 1836 – 21 April 1926) – married John Quintal, great-grandson of Matthew Quintal, 9 children
6. Ann Naomi Nobbs (4 July 1838 – 27 September 1931) – married Caleb Quintal, grandson of Matthew Quintal, 7 children
7. James Wingate Johnstone Nobbs (22 September 1839 – 26 March 1909) – married Isabella Emily Christian, great-granddaughter of Fletcher Christian, 12 children.
8. George Edwin Coffin Nobbs (5 May 1843 – 5 September 1864) – died from tetanus contracted as a result of being hit by an arrow in Graciosa Bay, Santa Cruz Island while accompanying Bishop John Patteson on one of his missions in the Solomon Islands aboard the Southern Cross.
9. Jemima Sarah Nobbs (13 May 1845 – 14 January 1920) – married Gilbert Edwin Christian, great-grandson of Fletcher Christian, 1 child
10. Alfred Augustine Nobbs (27 November 1846 – 28 September 1906) – married Mary Emily Christian, twice great-great-granddaughter of Fletcher Christian and great-granddaughter of Matthew Quintal, 8 children
11. Sydney Nobbs Rawdon (born Sydney Herbert Nobbs) (born 27 May 1848 died in England) – married Adelina Sophia Christian, great-granddaughter of both Fletcher Christian and Matthew Quintal, 2 sons (died in infancy), married Albina Dora Boyd (a Canadian), at least 4 children
12. Alice Henrietta Florence Nobbs (born 12 March 1857) – married Joseph Whiteley Hebblethwaite, 2 children
