= Benjamin Stanley Young =

Pitcairn Island politician (1851–1934)

Benjamin Stanley Young (13 December 1851 –16 August 1934) served as Magistrate of the British Overseas Territory of the Pitcairn Islands twice, from 1884 to 1885, and in 1892. Young's father, Simon Young, also served as magistrate.

Young was a descendant of HMS Bounty mutineers Ned Young, John Adams and Fletcher Christian, as well as John Buffett, a schoolteacher and whaler, who had arrived on Pitcairn in 1823 to help Adams teach the islands' many children. His siblings included William Alfred Young, Arthur Herbert Young, and the historian Rosalind Amelia Young.

Young married Rebecca Holman Ascension McCoy, the daughter of Matthew McCoy. They had seven children.
