= Simon Young (magistrate) =

Pitcairn Islands politician (1823–1893)

- Born: August 11, 1823; Adamstown, Pitcairn Islands
- Died: September 26, 1893 (aged 70)
- Title: Magistrate of the Pitcairn Islands
- Term: 1849–1849
- Predecessor: George Adams
- Successor: Arthur Quintal II
- Spouse: Mary Buffett Christian-Young
- Children: 13
- Parent(s): George Young; Hannah Adams Young

Simon Young (11 August 1823 – 26 September 1893) served as Magistrate of the British colony of the Pitcairn Islands in 1849.

Young was the son of George Young, who in turn was the son of Bounty mutineer Ned Young. His mother was Hannah Adams, a daughter of John Adams. Young married Mary Buffett Christian. His father-in-law John Buffett had arrived on the island in 1823 (the year Young was born) as a schoolteacher, and had stayed to help Adams teach the islands many children. Young himself was a schoolteacher by trade. He spent several years on Norfolk Island but returned to Pitcairn in 1864.

Young's marriage produced 13 children, including two future Magistrates, Benjamin Stanley Young, William Alfred Young and Arthur Herbert Young, and the historian Rosalind Amelia Young.
