= Edward Quintal =

First magistrate of Pitcairn Island

Edward Quintal (1800 – 8 September 1841) was the first magistrate of the British Overseas Territory of Pitcairn Island.

Quintal was the son of Matthew Quintal, the Bounty mutineer, and Teraura, the partner of Ned Young, and the future spouse of Thursday October Christian. The elder Quintal was killed by a hatchet the year before Edward was born. Quintal married Dinah Adams, the daughter of John Adams and Vahineatua on 4 March 1819.

Quintal was appointed elder by Joshua Hill in 1833, and he held the office of magistrate from 1838 to 1839. He was succeeded by his half-brother Arthur Quintal. He died on Pitcairn Island on 8 September 1841.

== Children ==
Edward and his wife Dinah Adams had several children:

Name	Date of birth	Date of death
William Quintal	1817	6 July 1905
Martha Quintal	1882	25 December 1893
Edward Quintal	31 October 1824	5 January 1856
Abraham Blatchly Quintal	31 January 1827	20 September 1910
Louisa Quintal	7 March 1829	5 February 1873
Nancy Quintal	6 June 1831	24 December 1853
Susan Quintal	5 November 1833	18 February 1917
Caleb Quintal	5 September 1837	7 May 1873
Joseph Napoleon Quintal	7 December 1839	2 October 1841
