= Fletcher Christian II =

Pitcairn Island politician

Fletcher Christian II (1812 – 5 April 1852) served as magistrate of the British Overseas Territory of Pitcairn Island in 1842. Christian was the grandson of Fletcher Christian, the Bounty mutineer, through his son Charles Christian. He was the cousin of Thursday October Christian II. Like Thursday, Christian was of Polynesian descent from 3 of his grandparents. His mother was Sully, the daughter of Teio.
