= Arthur Quintal I =

Second magistrate of the Pitcairn Islands

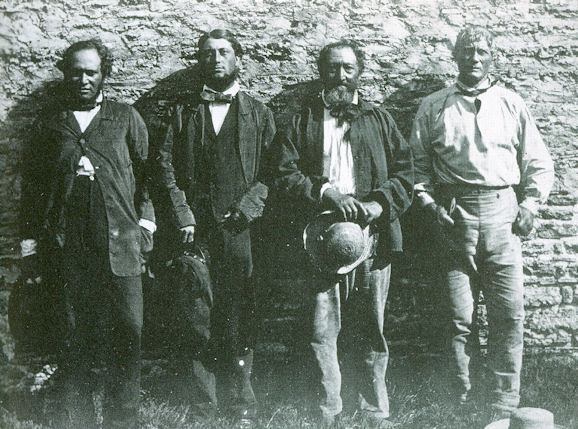
- Descendants of the mutineers on Norfolk Island, 1862; Arthur Quintal I at far right
- Born: May 6, 1795; Adamstown, Pitcairn Islands
- Died: November 19, 1873 (aged 78); Kingston, Norfolk Island
- Resting place: Norfolk Island Cemetery
- Title: Magistrate of the Pitcairn Islands
- Term: 1840 - 1841
- Predecessor: Edward Quintal
- Successor: Fletcher Christian II
- Spouses: Catherine McCoy Quintal; Mary Christian Quintal
- Children: 14
- Parent(s): Matthew Quintal; Tevarua Quintal

Arthur Quintal (6 May 1795 – 19 November 1873) was a Pitcairn Islander who served as the island's second magistrate from 1840 to 1841. Quintal was the son of Matthew Quintal, the HMS Bounty mutineer, and his wife Tevarua. The elder Quintal was killed with a hatchet in 1799. Arthur appears to have inherited some of his father's bad temper; he allegedly treated his sister Jane 'so harshly' she left the island and never returned. Quintal also allegedly made a pact with his best friend Daniel McCoy, to take each other's sister as a wife. Quintal married Catherine McCoy, and they had nine children, including Arthur Quintal II, who also became magistrate. After Catherine's death in 1831, Arthur married Mary Christian and had a further 5 children. He succeeded his half brother as magistrate and was succeeded by his brother-in-law. Quintal died on Norfolk Island in 1873.
