= James Russell McCoy =

Pitcairn Island politician (1845–1924)

- Born: September 4, 1845; Adamstown, Pitcairn Islands
- Died: February 14, 1924 (aged 78); Adamstown, Pitcairn Islands
- Resting place: Pitcairn Islands Cemetery
- Title: Magistrate of the Pitcairn Islands
- Term: 1870-1872, 1878-1879, 1883, 1886-1889
- Spouse: Eliza Young Coffin-Palmer-McCoy

James Russell McCoy (4 September 1845 – 14 February 1924) served as Magistrate of the British Overseas Territory of Pitcairn Island 7 times, between 1870 and 1904. McCoy was among the first wave of settlers to return to Pitcairn from Norfolk Island in 1859. He was the son of Matthew McCoy and Margaret Christian. His son Matthew Edmond McCoy also served as Magistrate, and was among the last islanders to hold the surname McCoy. Through his daughter Adelia, he is a grandfather of Warren Clive Christian, and Ivan Christian, and a great-grandfather of Steve Christian and Brenda Christian.

== Literary reference ==
He appears as Magistrate "James Russell Nickoy" in Mark Twain's 1879 story "The Great Revolution in Pitcairn." There he is forced to resign his post through the political intrigue of an American interloper, Butterworth Stavely.

Jack London reinvented McCoy as a mythic hero and agent of redemption in the short story "The Seed of McCoy," based on a true incident of piloting a burning ship to safety in 1900.
