= Matthew McCoy (magistrate) =

Pitcairn Island politician (1819–1853)

Matthew McCoy (1819 - January 31, 1853) served as Magistrate of the British Overseas Territory of Pitcairn Island twice, in 1843 and in 1853. McCoy was the son of Daniel McCoy and Sarah Quintal, making him the grandson of HMS Bounty mutineers William McCoy and Matthew Quintal. He married Margaret Christian, making him the brother-in-law of his predecessor Fletcher Christian II. McCoy had 12 children, including Magistrate James Russell McCoy and Rebecca Holman Ascension McCoy, who married Benjamin Stanley Young. McCoy was fatally wounded when the Bounty cannon was fired to mark the departing of a ship; the cannon exploded shattering his right arm. The arm was amputated and he died days later.
