= Arthur Quintal II =

Pitcairn Island politician

Arthur Quintal, Jr. (c. 1816 – 20 August 1902) served as Magistrate of the Overseas British Territory of Pitcairn Island on three occasions between 1845 and 1854, he served as Magistrate of Norfolk Island twice between 1862 and 1885. Quintal was the son of Arthur Quintal, Sr. and Catherine McCoy. He was a grandson of Matthew Quintal and William McCoy. Quintal was known as Dowley. Quintal married Martha Quintal, his half-cousin, who was the daughter of Edward Quintal, Arthur Sr's half-brother. They had 11 children, Quintal died on Norfolk Island in 1902.
