= Moses Young =

Pitcairn Island politician

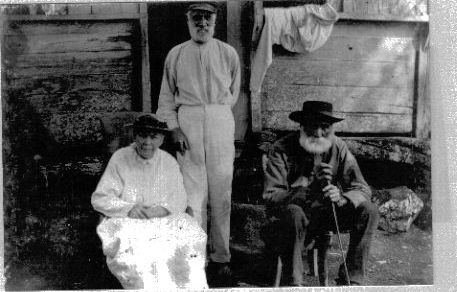
- Moses Young (standing), with wife Albina, and his uncle Thursday October Christian II, in 1906.
- Born: September 30, 1829; Pitcairn Island
- Died: July 14, 1909 (aged 79); Pitcairn Island
- Spouse: Albina McCoy
- Children: 12 Children

Moses Young (30 September 1829 – 14 July 1909), grandson of HMS Bounty mutineer Ned Young and great-grandson of mutineer Fletcher Christian, served as magistrate of the British Overseas Territory of Pitcairn Island four times, between 1865 and 1881. Young married Albina McCoy, and together they had 12 children.
