= Thursday October Christian II =

Pitcairn Islands political leader

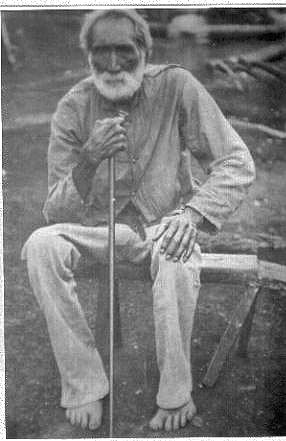
- Thursday October Christian II taken around his 70th birthday, around 1890
- Spouse: Mary Young (m. 1839)
- Parent(s): Thursday October Christian, Teraura

Thursday October Christian II was a Pitcairn Islands political leader. He was the grandson of Fletcher Christian and son of Thursday October Christian, and mother, Teraura. He was also known as "Doctor", "Duddie" or "Doodie". He spent several years on Norfolk Island but returned to Pitcairn in 1864. Christian was three quarters Polynesian.

He was the fifth Magistrate of the Pitcairn Islands, holding the office in 1844, 1851, 1864, 1867, 1873–1874, 1880 and 1882. Everyone named Christian on Pitcairn is descended from him; a number of family branches, however, left Pitcairn permanently and settled on Norfolk Island.

He married Mary Young, granddaughter of Ned Young, on 24 March 1839.

== Literary reference ==
Thursday October Christian II appears in Mark Twain's 1879 story "The Great Revolution in Pitcairn".

== See also ==
- Descendants of the Bounty mutineers
