= Christian (surname) =

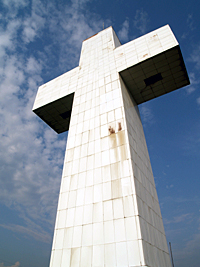
- The cross

Origin
- Languages: Greek, Latin, Hebrew
- Meaning: Follower of Christ
- Region of origin: Isle of Man

Christian is an English surname from the Latin "Christianus" meaning follower of Christ, from "christus" ("anointed"), created to translate the Hebrew messiah. As one of the native Manx surnames, the name originates as an anglicisation of "Mac Christen"; Notable people with the surname include:

- Ash Christian (1985–2020), American actor and film director
- Autumn Christian, American writer
- Harold Christian (1871–1950), South African-Rhodesian farmer
- Barry Christian (died 2026), American politician
- Betty Christian (1942–2026), member of the Island Council of the Pitcairn Islands
- Bill Christian (born 1938), American ice hockey player
- Channon Christian, victim of Murders of Channon Christian and Christopher Newsom in 2007 in Tennessee, U.S.
- Charlie Christian (1916–1942), American swing and jazz guitarist
- Clara Marguerite Christian (1895–1964), first black woman to study at the University of Edinburgh
- Claudia Christian (born 1965), American actress, a writer, a director singer and musician
- Cody Christian (born 1995), American actor
- Dave Christian (born 1959), American ice-hockey player
- Ewan Christian (1814–1895), British architect
- Fletcher Christian (1764–1793), Bounty mutineer settled on Pitcairn Island
- Frank Christian (disambiguation), several people
- Frederick Christian (disambiguation), several people
- Garth Christian (1921–1967), English nature writer, editor, teacher and conservationist
- Gerald Christian (born 1991), American football player
- Geron Christian (born 1996), American football player
- Glen Christian (born c. 1929), American football player
- Hans Christian (disambiguation), multiple people
- Henry B. Christian (1883–1953), American painter
- Hugh Cloberry Christian (1747–1798), Royal Navy rear-admiral
- Ivan Christian (1919–1991), Pitcairn Island politician
- James Christian (born 1953), American musician
- Jarell Christian (born 1986), American basketball player and coach
- John Christian (disambiguation), multiple people
- J. Orlean Christian (c. 1898–1979), American college sports coach
- Keith Christian, Australian zoologist
- Leonard Arthur Christian (1889–1955), Canadian World War I flying ace
- Lemuel McPherson Christian (1913–2000), Dominican composer
- Linda Christian (1923–2011), Mexican film actress
- Luci Christian (born 1973), American voice actress
- Maddy Christian (born 2004), American ice hockey player
- Mary Christian (politician) (1924–2019), American educator and politician
- Mary Ellen Christian (1848–1941), Australian contralto and teacher of singing
- Neil Christian (1943–2010), British singer
- Pearle Christian (born 1955), Dominican music educator, composer and cultural worker
- Phyllis M. Christian (born 1956), Ghanaian lawyer and consultant
- Robert Christian (1939–1983), American actor
- Robert Francis Christian (1948–2019), American Roman Catholic bishop
- Roy Christian (born 1943), New Zealand rugby league footballer
- Sharon Christian (1950–2015), Canadian artist
- Shawn Christian (born 1965), American television and film actor
- Stephen Christian (born 1980), American rock singer
- Steve Christian (born 1951), Pitcairn Island politician
- Terry Christian (born 1962), British television and radio presenter
- Thomas Christian (1754–1828), Manx poet and translator
- Tom Christian (1935–2013), Pitcairn Island radio operator
- William Christian (disambiguation), several people
