= History of the Caribbean =

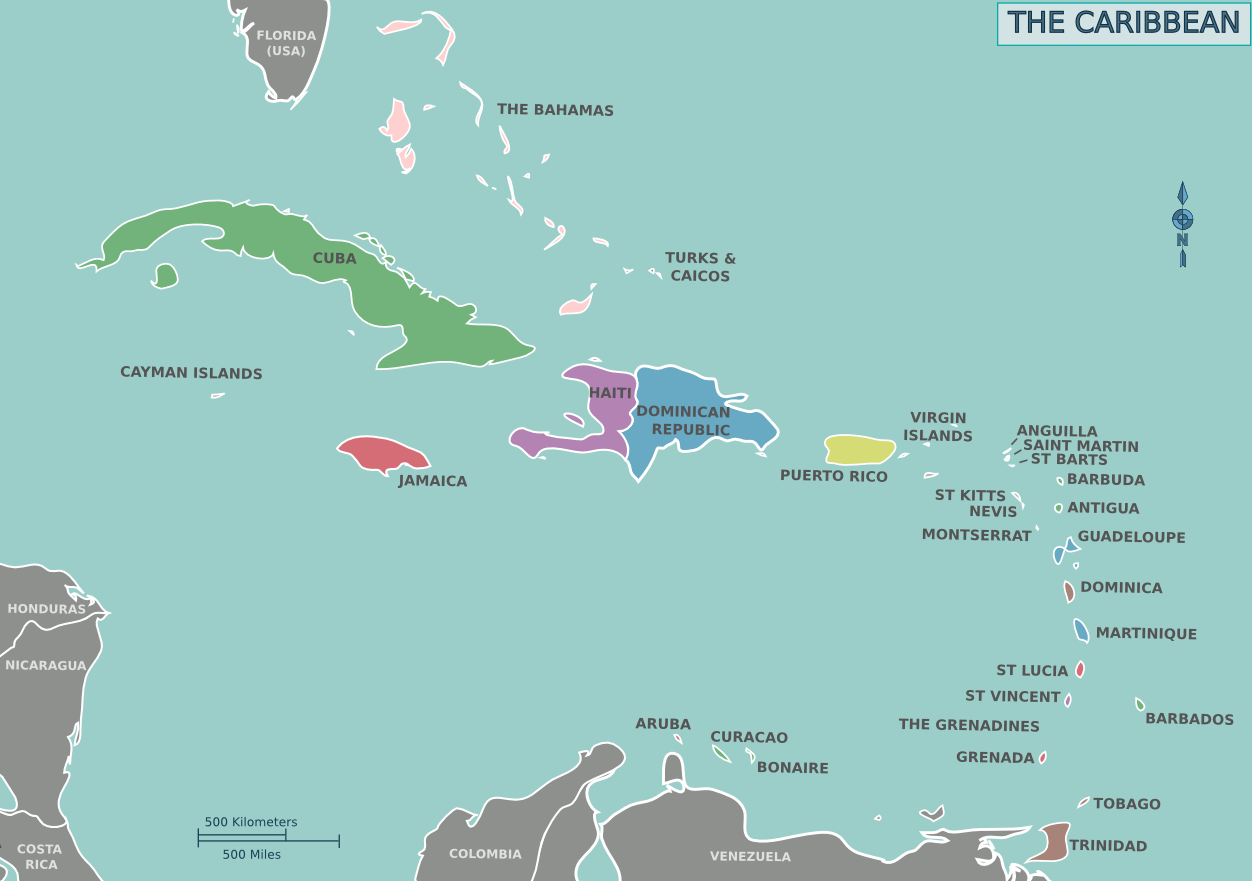
Contemporary political map of the Caribbean

The history of the Caribbean reveals the region's significant role in the colonial struggles of the European powers since the 15th century. In the modern era, it remains strategically and economically important. In 1492, Christopher Columbus landed in the Caribbean and claimed the region for Spain. The following year, the first Spanish settlements were established in the Caribbean. Although the Spanish conquests of the Aztec Empire and the Inca Empire in the early sixteenth century made Mexico and Peru more desirable places for Spanish exploration and settlement, the Caribbean remained strategically important.

From the 1620s and 1630s onwards, non-Hispanic privateers, traders, and settlers established permanent colonies and trading posts on the Caribbean islands neglected by Spain. Such colonies spread throughout the Caribbean, from the Bahamas in the northwest to Tobago in the southeast. Furthermore, during this period, French, Dutch, and English buccaneers settled on the island of Tortuga, the northern and western coasts of Hispaniola (Haiti and Dominican Republic), and later in Jamaica as well as the island of Martinique.

After the Spanish–American War in 1898, the islands of Cuba and Puerto Rico were no longer part of the Spanish Empire in the Western Hemisphere. In the 20th century, the Caribbean was again important during World War II, in the decolonization wave after the war, and in the tension between Communist Cuba and the United States. The exploitation of the labor of Indigenous peoples and the demographic collapse of that population, forced migration of enslaved Africans, immigration of Europeans, Chinese, South Asians, and others, and rivalry amongst world powers since the sixteenth century have given Caribbean history an impact disproportionate to its size. Many islands have attained independence from colonial powers and sovereignty; others have formal political ties with major powers, including the United States. The early economic structure integrating the Caribbean into the Atlantic World and world economic system continues to impact the modern Caribbean region.

== Before European contact ==
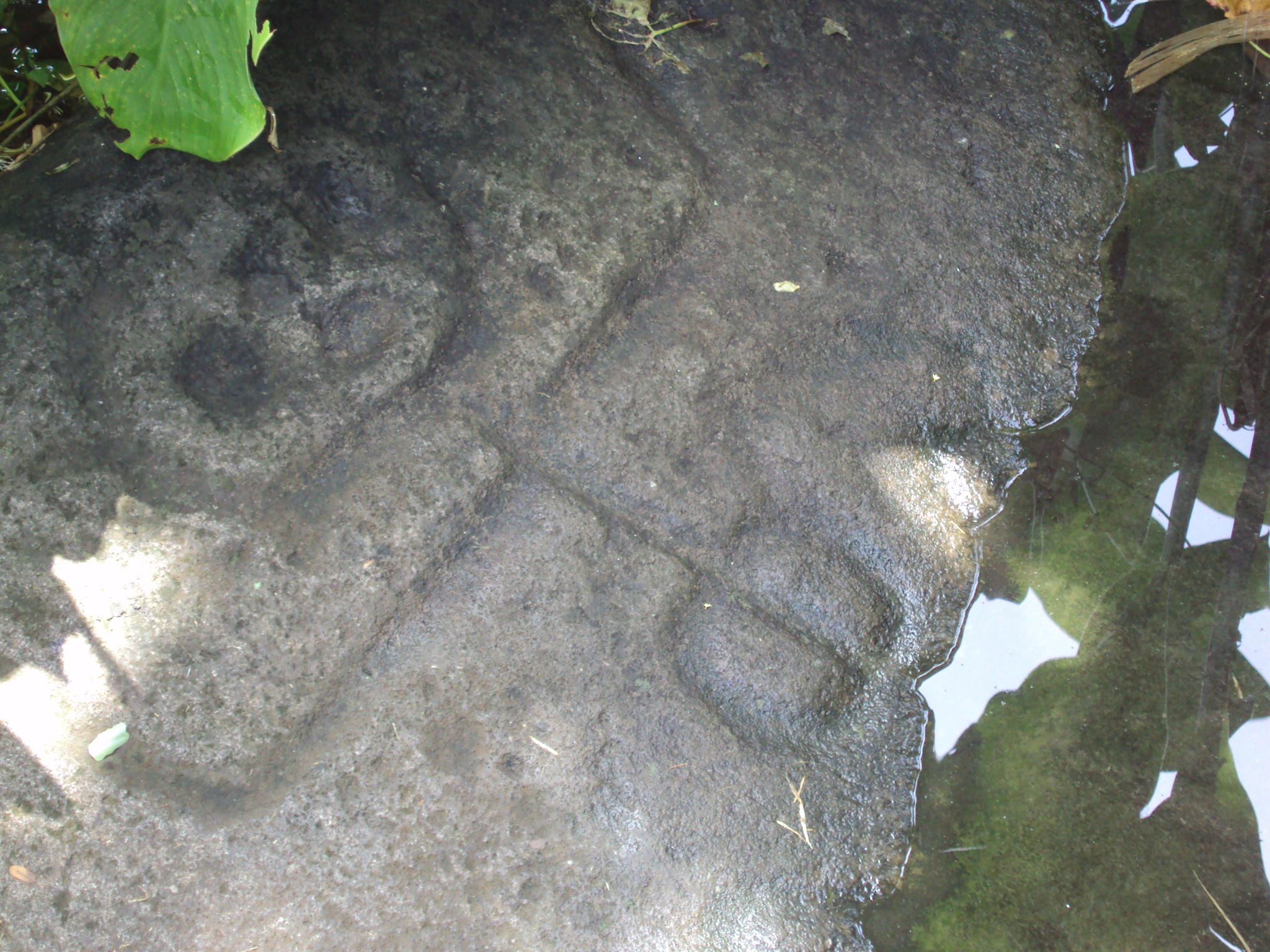
An Arawak stone carving uncovered in Guadeloupe.

During European contact in 1492, Caribbean islands were densely populated by different indigenous groups. Recent scholarly research has investigated the origins and evolution of the islands' populations over the entire period. At the beginning of the current geological epoch, the Holocene era, the northern part of South America was occupied by groups of small-game hunters, fishers, and foragers. These groups occasionally resided in semi-permanent campsites while mostly being mobile to use a wide range of plant and animal resources in various habitats.

Archaeological evidence suggests that Trinidad was the first Caribbean island settled as early as 9000/8000 BCE. However, the first settlers most likely arrived in Trinidad when it was still attached to South America by land bridges. It was not until about 7000/6000 BCE, during the early Holocene that Trinidad became an island rather than part of the mainland due to a significant jump in sea level by about 60 m., which may be attributable to climate change. The conclusion is that Trinidad was the only Caribbean Island that could have been colonized by Indigenous people from the South American mainland by not traversing hundreds or thousands of kilometers of the open sea. The earliest major habitation sites discovered in Trinidad are the shell midden deposits of Banwari Trace and St. John, which have been dated between 6000 and 5100 BCE. Both shell middens represent extended deposits of shells discarded by human populations utilizing the crustaceans as a food source and stone and bone tools. They are considered to belong to the Ortoiroid archaeological tradition, named after the similar but much more recent Ortoire site in Mayaro, Trinidad.

Scholars have attempted to classify Caribbean prehistory into different "ages," a difficult and controversial task. In the 1970s archaeologist Irving Rouse defined three "ages" to classify Caribbean prehistory: the Lithic, Archaic and Ceramic Age, based on archaeological evidence. Current literature on Caribbean prehistory still uses these three terms, but, there is much dispute regarding their usefulness and definition. In general, the Lithic Age is considered the first era of human development in the Americas and the period where stone chipping was first practiced. The ensuing Archaic age is often defined by specialized subsistence adaptions, combining hunting, fishing, collecting and the managing of wild food plants. Ceramic Age communities manufactured ceramic and made use of small-scale agriculture.

Except for Trinidad, the first Caribbean islands were settled during the Archaic Age between 3500 and 3000 BCE. Archaeological sites of this period have been located in Barbados, Cuba, Curaçao and St. Martin, followed closely by Hispaniola and Puerto Rico. This settlement phase is often attributed to the Ortoiroid culture. However, in the southern Lesser Antilles, particularly Grenada and St. Vincent, evidence for Archaic occupation is ephemeral and consists mainly of isolated shell finds rather than established settlements, suggesting these islands may have been largely bypassed by early foragers.

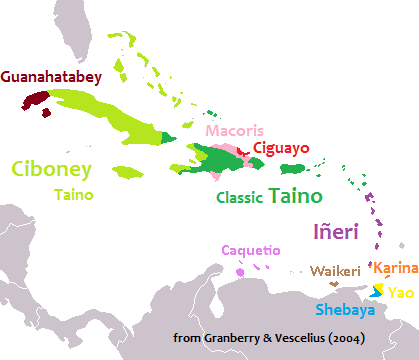
Linguistic map of the Caribbean in CE 1500, before European colonization, according to Julian Granberry and Gary Vescelius.

Between 800 and 200 BCE a new migratory group expanded through the Caribbean island: the Saladoid. This group is named after the Saladero site in Venezuela, where their distinctive pottery (typically distinguished by white-on-red painted designs) was first identified. The introduction of pottery and plant domestication to the Caribbean is often attributed to Saladoid groups and is considered the beginning of the Ceramic Age. However, recent studies have revealed that crops and pottery were already present in some Archaic Caribbean populations before the arrival of the Saladoid. Although a large number of Caribbean Islands were settled during the Archaic and Ceramic Ages, some islands were presumably visited much later. Jamaica has no known settlements until around 600 CE while the Cayman Islands show no evidence of settlement before European arrival.

Following the colonization of Trinidad, it was originally proposed that Saladoid groups island-hopped their way to Puerto Rico, but current research tends to move away from this stepping-stone model in favor of the "southward route hypothesis." This hypothesis proposes that the northern Antilles were settled directly from South America followed by progressively southward movements into the Lesser Antilles. This hypothesis has been supported by both radiocarbon dates and seafaring simulations. For example, radiocarbon evidence from Grenada indicates no permanent Ceramic Age settlements until roughly AD 200, centuries later than islands to the north. Modeling based on the Ideal Free Distribution (IFD) further supports this, showing settlement timing in the region correlates with latitude, with northern islands settled earlier. One initial impetus of movement from the mainland to the northern Antilles may have been the search for high quality materials such as flint. Flinty Bay on Antigua is one of the best-known sources of high-quality flint in the Lesser Antilles. The presence of flint from Antigua on many other Caribbean Islands highlights the importance of this material during the Pre-Contact period.

The period from 650 to 800 CE saw major cultural, socio-political and ritual reformulations, which took place both on the mainland and in many Caribbean islands. The Saladoid interaction sphere disintegrated rapidly. This period is characterized with a change in climate. Centuries of abundant rainfall were replaced by prolonged droughts and increased frequency of hurricanes. In general, the Caribbean population increased, with communities changing from scattered single villages to the creation of settlement clusters. Agricultural activity increased. In the southern Windward Islands, research utilizing Resilience Theory suggests this population expansion amid drought was driven by an influx of Arauquinoid migrants from the mainland around AD 750. This acted as a "release" mechanism, breaking earlier cultural rigidity and leading to the "Troumassan Troumassoid" period, characterized by settlement in diverse environments and a reorganized society capable of coping with aridity. Settlement choices during this time were heavily influenced by proximity to freshwater wetlands and, later, large coral reefs. Analysis of cultural material has also shown the development of tighter networks between islands during the post-Saladoid period.

The period after 800 CE can be seen as a period of transition in which status differentiation and hierarchically ranked society evolved, identified by a shift from achieved to ascribed leadership. After about 1200 CE this process was interrupted by the absorption of many Caribbean settlements into the evolving socio-political structure of the Greater Antillean society. This process disrupted more-or-less independent lines of development of local communities and marked the beginnings of sociopolitical changes on a much larger scale.

At the time of the European arrival, three major groups of indigenous peoples lived on the islands: the Taíno (sometimes also referred to as Arawak) in the Greater Antilles, the Bahamas and the Leeward Islands; the Kalinago and Galibi in the Windward Islands; and the Ciboney in western Cuba. Scholars have divided Taínos into Classic Taínos, who occupied Hispaniola and Puerto Rico, Western Taínos, who occupied Cuba, Jamaica, and the Bahamian archipelago, and the Eastern Taínos, who occupied the Leeward Islands. Trinidad was inhabited by both Carib speaking and Arawak-speaking groups. Recent archaeological evidence from Grenada suggests that the group historically identified as "Caribs" (or Caraïbe) were likely long-term, Arawakan-speaking inhabitants producing Suazan Troumassoid pottery, who co-existed and allied with a separate "Galibi" group, likely recent arrivals from the mainland associated with Cayo pottery. This challenges the traditional narrative of a total "Carib invasion" replacing the Arawak population, arguing for a more complex mosaic of interaction.

DNA studies changed some of the traditional understandings of pre-Contact indigenous history. In 2003, a geneticist from the University of Puerto Rico at Mayagüez, Juan Martínez Cruzado, designed an island-wide DNA survey of Puerto Rico's modern population. The received understanding of the profile of Puerto Ricans' ancestry has been as mainly having Spanish ethnic origins, with some African ancestry, and distant and less significant indigenous ancestry. Martínez Cruzado's research revealed that 61% of all Puerto Ricans have Amerindian mitochondrial DNA, 27% have African and 12% Caucasian. According to National Geographic, "Among the surprising findings is that most of the Caribbean's original inhabitants may have been wiped out by South American newcomers a thousand years before the Spanish invasion that began in 1492. Moreover, indigenous populations of islands like Puerto Rico and Hispaniola were likely far smaller at the time of the Spanish arrival than previously thought."

== Early colonial history ==
Soon after the voyages of Christopher Columbus to the Americas in 1492, both Portuguese and Spanish ships began claiming territories in Central and South America. These colonies brought in gold, and other European powers, most specifically the English, Dutch and French, hoped to establish profitable colonies of their own. Imperial rivalries made the Caribbean a contested area during European wars for centuries. In the Spanish American wars of independence in the early nineteenth century, most of Spanish America broke away from the Spanish Empire, but Cuba and Puerto Rico remained under the Spanish crown until the Spanish–American War of 1898.

=== Spanish Empire and Caribbean settlements ===
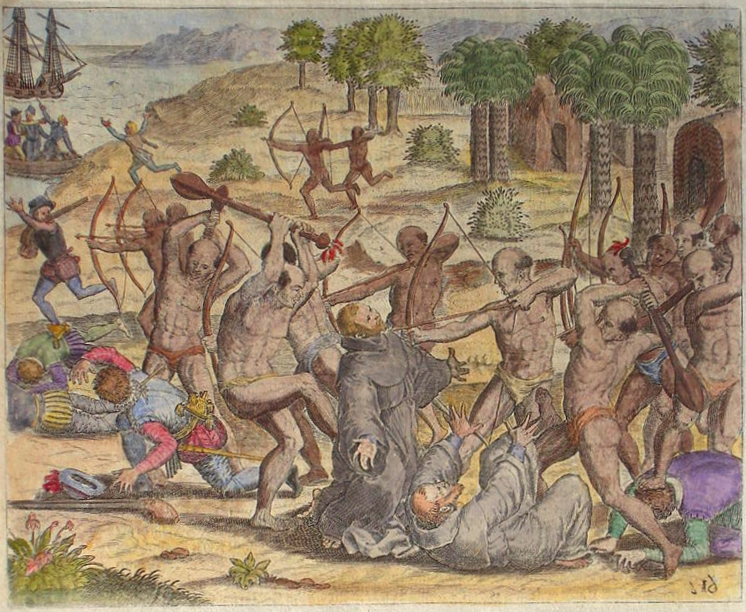
The Natives of Cumaná attack the mission after Gonzalo de Ocampo's slaving raid. Colored copperplate by Theodor de Bry, published in the "Relación brevissima de la destruccion de las Indias".

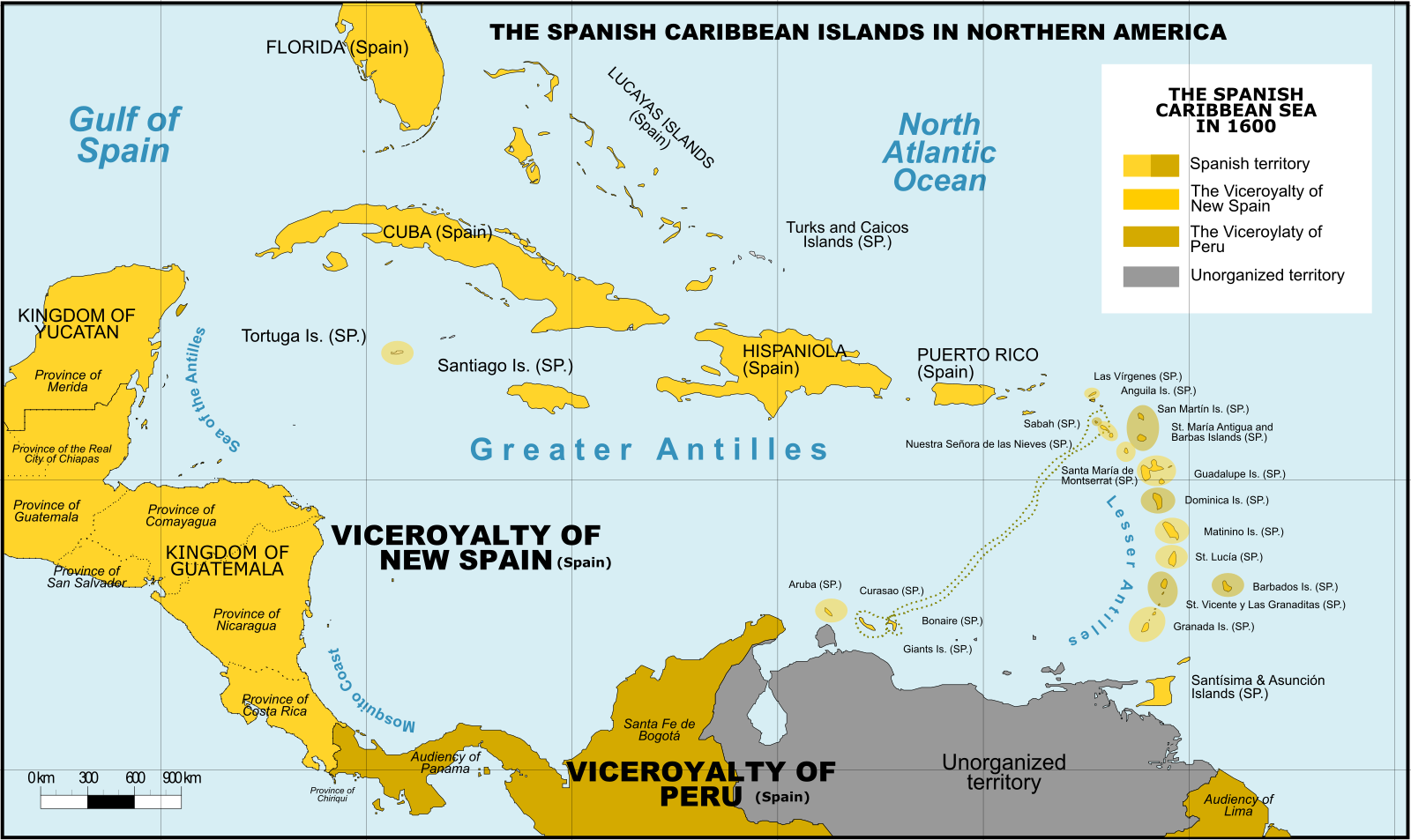
Spanish Caribbean Islands in the American Viceroyalties 1600.

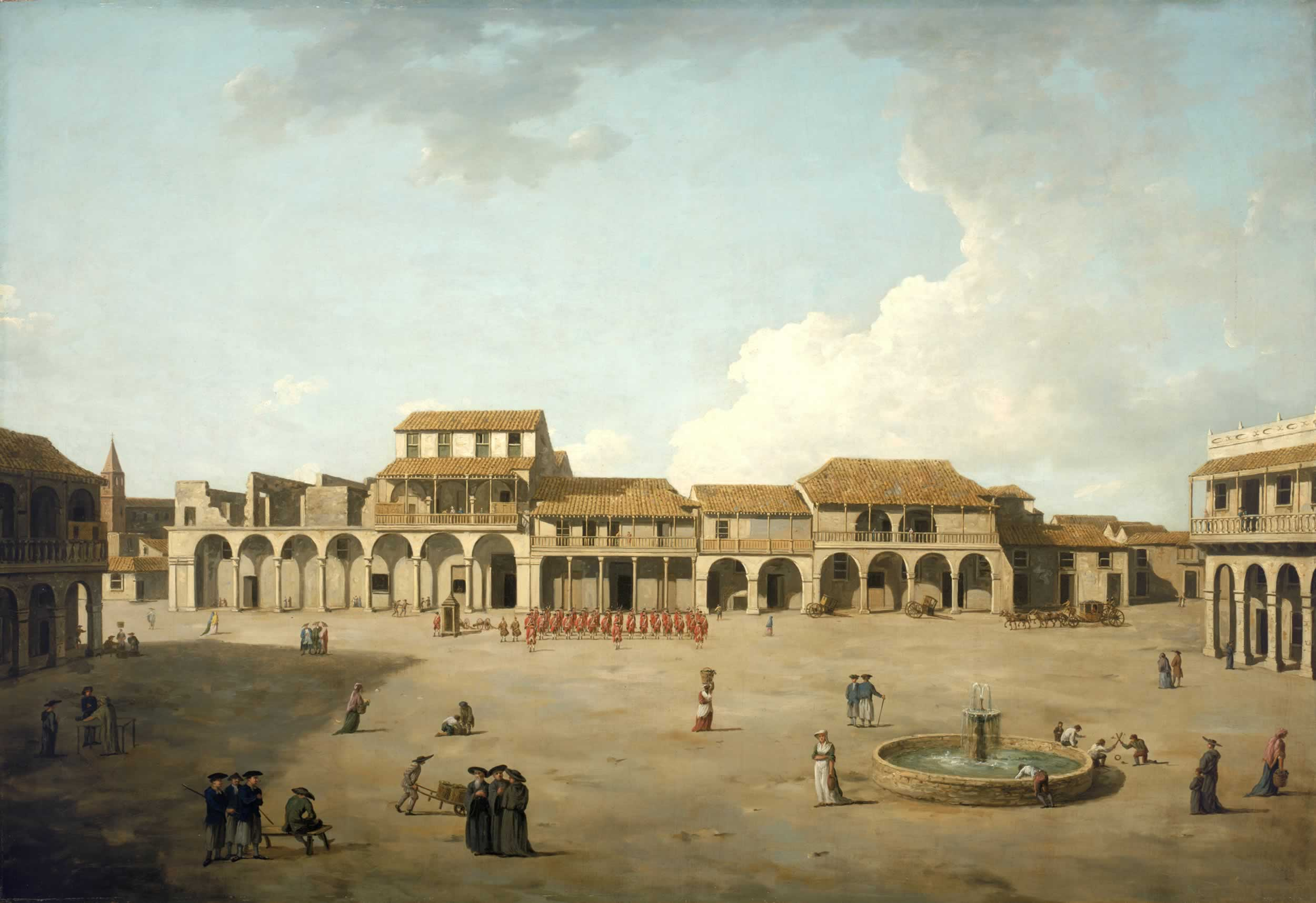
The Piazza at Havana by Dominic Serres. The Piazza of Havana, Cuba occupied by British troops following the Siege of Havana, in 1762, during the Seven Years' War.

The Spanish encounter with lands and peoples unknown to them before the 1492 began with the first voyage of Genoese mariner Christopher Columbus, sailing under license from Queen Isabel I of Castile. Permanent Spanish settlement began in 1493. The first quarter century of Spanish settlement in the Caribbean set enduring patterns that were to be replicated throughout the Americas. After the Spanish conquest of the Aztec Empire and the subsequent conquest of Peru with their dense indigenous populations organized in high civilizations and the discovery of rich deposits of precious metals, the Caribbean ceased to be the primary focus of the Spanish Empire in the Americas. But the administrative, social, and cultural patterns the Spanish set in the Caribbean were enduring. Spanish contact and exploitation of the indigenous peoples of the Caribbean had devastating consequences for the natives. Natives' deaths through disease and overwork prompted in Spanish settlers' search for indigenous labor on other Caribbean islands, resulting in the enslavement of natives and their transportation to the islands of Spanish settlement. Most saliently, the crown considered the indigenous population their new vassals and the crown attempted to stem the precipitous loss of indigenous population and settlers' enslavement and maltreatment of the indigenous population by enacting laws to curb settlers' exploitative activities.

During Columbus's first voyage of exploration in 1492, he made contact with the Lucayans, whom he called "Indians" (indios) in the Bahamas and the Taíno in Cuba and the northern coast of Hispaniola. Starting with his second voyage in 1493, Spaniards came to settle permanently in the region dubbed "The Indies". Spaniards saw evidence of gold deposits when seeing natives' gold personal ornaments enticing the Spanish search for wealth. Although Spain claimed the entire Caribbean and concluded the Treaty of Tordesillas (1494) with Portugal that divided the world between the two monarchies, Spaniards settled only the larger islands of Hispaniola (now the Dominican Republic) (1493), where they founded the permanent settlement of Santo Domingo. The Spanish later founded settlements on Martinique (1502); Puerto Rico (1508); Jamaica (1509); Cuba (1511); and Trinidad (1530), and the small 'pearl islands' of Cubagua and Margarita off the Venezuelan coast because of their valuable pearl beds, which were worked extensively between 1508 and 1530.

The Spanish settled permanently in the Caribbean, establishing as far as possible lives similar or better than what they had in Iberia. Unlike the Portuguese pattern of expansion that created a series of small trading posts or forts, Spaniards' expectation was to create Spanish-style cities with permanent residents. They expected to use forced labor of the indigenous population to make European settlement not only possible but also profitable. Spaniards required the natives produce food for European settlers, putting strain on agriculture that did not generally produce major surpluses. Spaniards took it as their right to force the indigenous to labor for them in enterprises often far from natives' home villages. The allocation of labor to individual Spanish settlers was via grants, called encomiendas; the holders of these grants, encomenderos set indigenous to search for deposits of gold and mine it. The most famous account of the abuses and exploitation was by Dominican friar Bartolomé de las Casas, who influenced the Spanish crown to create laws to end the abuses and to attempt to stem the precipitous plunge of the indigenous populations. To supplement and then replace the dwindling indigenous labor force, the Spanish transported enslaved Africans to the Caribbean to work on plantations cultivating cane sugar, a high-value export product.

Spaniards continued their explorations of islands and the lands around the Caribbean Sea in search of sources of dense indigenous populations and material wealth. The expedition of Spanish settler on Cuba, Hernán Cortés, resulted in Spanish conquest of the Aztec Empire in 1521, which shifted the crown's focus to Mexico.

=== Other European powers ===
Political evolution of Central America and the Caribbean from 1700 to present

Although the Caribbean remained strategically important for the Spanish Empire, other European powers established a presence in the Caribbean after Spain's main interest turned toward Mexico and Peru, where there were dense indigenous populations that could be forced to labor and where there were rich deposits of silver. The Dutch, the French and the English conquered islands claimed by Spain but not effectively controlled. For European powers without colonies in the Americas, the islands presented possibilities for commercial development of sugar plantations on the model established by the Spanish, using enslaved African laborers. Also important was that the islands could serve as bases for trade and piracy in the region. Piracy in the Caribbean was widespread during the colonial era, especially between 1640 and 1680. The term "buccaneer" is often used to describe a pirate operating in this region.

- Francis Drake was an English privateer who attacked many Spanish settlements. His most celebrated Caribbean exploit was the capture of the Spanish Silver Train at Nombre de Dios in March 1573.
- British colonization of Bermuda began in 1612. British West Indian colonization began with Saint Kitts in 1623 and Barbados in 1627. The former was used as a base for British colonization of neighboring Nevis (1628), Antigua (1632), Montserrat (1632), Anguilla (1650) and Tortola (1672).
- French colonization too began on St. Kitts, the British and the French splitting the island amongst themselves in 1625. It was used as a base to colonize the much larger Guadeloupe (1635) and Martinique (1635), St. Martin (1648), St Barts (1648), and St Croix (1650), but was lost completely to Britain in 1713. From Martinique the French colonized St. Lucia (1643), Grenada (1649), Dominica (1715), and St. Vincent (1719).
- English admiral William Penn seized Jamaica in 1655 as part of Oliver Cromwell's Western Design after disastrously failing to conquer Hispaniola from the Spanish. Jamaica remained under British rule for over 300 years.
- In 1625 French buccaneers established a settlement on Tortuga, just to the north of Hispaniola, that the Spanish were never able to permanently destroy despite several attempts. The settlement on Tortuga was officially established in 1659 under the commission of King Louis XIV. In 1670 Cap François (later Cap Français, now Cap-Haïtien) was established on the mainland of Hispaniola. Under the 1697 Treaty of Ryswick, Spain officially ceded the western third of Hispaniola to France.
- The Dutch took over Saba, Saint Martin, Sint Eustatius, Curaçao, Bonaire, Aruba, Tobago, St. Croix, Tortola, Anegada, Virgin Gorda, Anguilla and a short time Puerto Rico, together called the Dutch West Indies, in the 17th century.
- Denmark–Norway first ruled part, then all of the present U.S. Virgin Islands since 1672, Denmark sold sovereignty over the Danish West Indies in 1917 to the United States, of which they are still a part.

=== Early French actions ===
During the first three-quarters of the sixteenth century, matters of balance of power and dynastic succession weighed heavily on the course of European diplomacy and war. Europe's largest and most powerful kingdoms, France and Spain, were the continent's fierce rivals. Tensions increased after 1516, when the kingdoms of Castile, León, and Aragon were ruled by Charles V as his inheritance from his maternal grandparents Isabel I of Castile and Ferdinand II of Aragon and his mother, Queen Joan. Three years later expanded Charles domains after his election as Holy Roman Emperor and the territories he held as his personal empire surrounded France. In 1521, France went to war with the Holy Roman Empire. Spanish troops routed French armies in France, the Italian Peninsula, and elsewhere, forcing the French Crown to surrender in 1526 and again in 1529. The Italian Wars, as the French-Spanish wars came to be known, reignited in 1536 and again in 1542. Intermittent warring between the Valois monarchy and the Habsburg Empire continued until 1559, when Charles abdicated and retired to a monastery after dividing his realms.

French corsair attacks began in the early 1520s, as soon as France declared war on Spain in 1521, the year Hernán Cortés defeated the Aztecs. Prodigious treasures from Mexico began to cross the Atlantic en route to Spain. French monarch Francis I challenged Spain's exclusivist claims to the New World and its wealth, demanding to see "the clause in Adam's will which excluded me from my share when the world was being divided." Giovanni da Verrazzano (aka Jean Florin) led the first recorded French corsair attack against Spanish vessels carrying treasures from the New World. In 1523, off the Cape of St. Vincent, Portugal, his vessels captured two Spanish ships laden with a fabulous treasure consisting of 70,000 ducats worth of gold, large quantities of silver and pearls, and 25,000 pounds of sugar, a much-treasured commodity at the time.

The first recorded incursion in the Caribbean happened in 1528, when a lone French corsair vessel appeared off the coast of Santo Domingo and its crew sacked the village of San Germán on the western coast of Puerto Rico. In the mid-1530s, corsairs, some Catholic but most of them Protestant (Huguenot), began routinely attacking Spanish vessels and raiding Caribbean ports and coastal towns; the most coveted were Santo Domingo, Havana, Santiago, and San Germán. Corsair port raids in Cuba and elsewhere in the region usually followed the rescate (ransom) model, whereby the aggressors seized villages and cities, kidnapped local residents, and demanded payment for their release. If there were no hostages, corsairs demanded ransoms in exchange for sparing towns from destruction. Whether ransoms were paid or not, corsairs looted and frequently committed acts of violence against their victims, desecrated churches and holy images, and left smoldering reminders of their incursions.

In 1536, France and Spain went to war again and French corsairs launched a series of attacks on Spanish Caribbean settlements and ships. The next year, a corsair vessel appeared in Havana and demanded a 700-ducat rescate. Spanish men-of-war arrived soon and scared off the intruding vessel, which returned soon thereafter to demand yet another rescate. Santiago was also victim of an attack that year, and both cities endured raids yet again in 1538. The waters off Cuba's northwest became particularly attractive to pirates as commercial vessels returning to Spain had to squeeze through the 90-mile-long strait between Key West and Havana. In 1537–1538, corsairs captured and sacked nine Spanish vessels. While France and Spain were at peace until 1542, beyond-the-line corsair activity continued. When war erupted again, it echoed once more in the Caribbean. A particularly vicious French corsair attack took place in Havana in 1543. It left a gory toll of 200 killed Spanish settlers. In all, between 1535 and 1563, French corsairs carried out around sixty attacks against Spanish settlements and captured over seventeen Spanish vessels in the region (1536–1547).

=== European rivalries and impact on the Caribbean ===
While the French and Spanish fought one another in Europe and the Caribbean, England sided with Spain, largely because of dynastic alliances. Spain's relations with England soured upon the crowning of the Protestant Elizabeth I in 1558. She openly supported the Dutch insurrection in the Spanish Netherlands and aided Huguenot forces in France. After decades of increasing tensions and confrontations in the northern Atlantic and the Caribbean, Anglo-Spanish hostilities broke out in 1585, when the English Crown dispatched over 7,000 troops to the Netherlands and Queen Elizabeth liberally granted licenses for privateers to carry out piracy against Spain's Caribbean possessions and vessels. Tensions further intensified in 1587, when Elizabeth I ordered the execution of Catholic Mary Queen of Scots after twenty years of captivity and gave the order for a preemptive attack against the Spanish Armada stationed in Cádiz. In retaliation, Spain organized the famous naval attack that ended tragically for Spain with the destruction of the "invincible" Armada in 1588. Spain rebuilt its naval forces, largely with galleons built in Havana, and continued to fight England until Elizabeth's death in 1603. Spain, however, had received a near-fatal blow that ended its standing as Europe's most powerful nation and virtually undisputed master of the Indies.

Following the Franco-Spanish peace treaty of 1559, crown-sanctioned French corsair activities subsided, but Huguenot pirate incursions persisted. In at least one this instance led to the formation of a temporary Huguenot settlement in the Isle of Pines, off Cuba. English piracy increased during the reign of Charles I, King of England, Scotland, and Ireland (1625–1649) and became more aggressive as Anglo-Spanish relations further deteriorated during the Thirty Years' War. Although Spain had been dealing with the insurrection of Netherlands against the Habsburg monarchy since the 1560s, the Dutch were latecomers to the Caribbean. They appeared in the region only after the mid-1590s, when the Dutch Republic was no longer on the defensive in its long conflict against Spain. Dutch privateering became more widespread and violent beginning in the 1620s.

English incursions in the Spanish-claimed Caribbean boomed during Queen Elizabeth's rule. These actions originally took the guise of well-organized, large-scale smuggling expeditions headed by piratical smugglers the likes of John Hawkins, John Oxenham, and Francis Drake. One of their main objectives were smuggling African slaves into Spain's Caribbean possessions in exchange for tropical products. The first instances of English mercantile piracy took place in 1562–63, when Hawkins' men raided a Portuguese vessel off the coast of Sierra Leone, captured the 300 slaves on board, and smuggled them into Santo Domingo in exchange for sugar, hides, and precious woods. Hawkins and his contemporaries pioneered the method of maximizing the number of slaves that could fit into a ship. He and other slave traders methodically packed enslaved Africans by forcing them to lie on their sides, spooned against one another. An example is Hawkins's slave-trading vessel Jesus of Lübeck, a ship he used on slave smuggling expeditions, on which he transported hundreds of enslaved Africans. In 1567 and 1568, Hawkins commanded two piratical smuggling expeditions, the last of which ended disastrously. He lost almost all of his ships and three-fourths of his men were killed by Spanish soldiers at San Juan de Ulúa, off the coast of Veracruz, the point of departure of the fleet of New Spain. Hawkins and Drake barely escaped but Oxenham was captured, convicted of heresy of Protestantism by the Mexican Inquisition and burned alive.

Many of the battles of the Anglo-Spanish War were fought in the Caribbean, not by regular English forces but rather by privateers whom Queen Elizabeth had licensed to carry out attacks on Spanish vessels and ports. These were former pirates who now held a more venerable status as privateers. During those years, over seventy-five documented English privateering expeditions targeted Spanish possessions and vessels. Drake terrorized Spanish vessels and ports. Early in 1586, his forces seized Santo Domingo, retaining control over it for around a month. Before departing they plundered and destroyed the city, taking a huge bounty. Drake's men destroyed images and ornaments in Catholic churches.

=== Enslavement of Africans ===
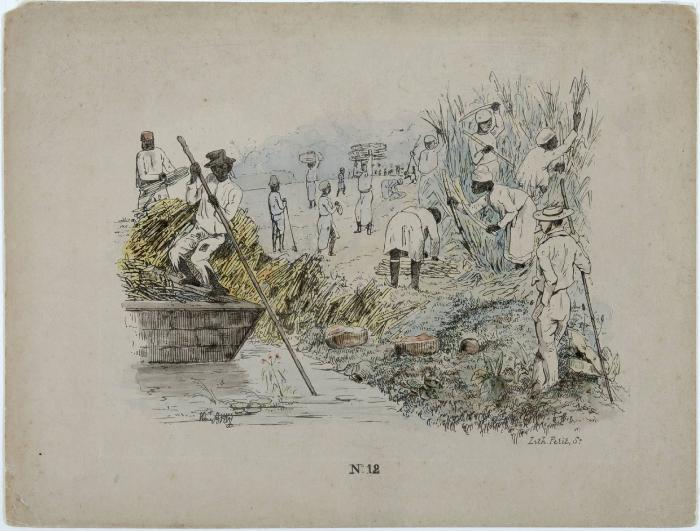
A 19th-century lithograph by Theodore Bray showing a sugarcane plantation. On right is "white officer", the European overseer, surveilling plantation workers. To the left is a flat-bottomed vessel for cane transportation.

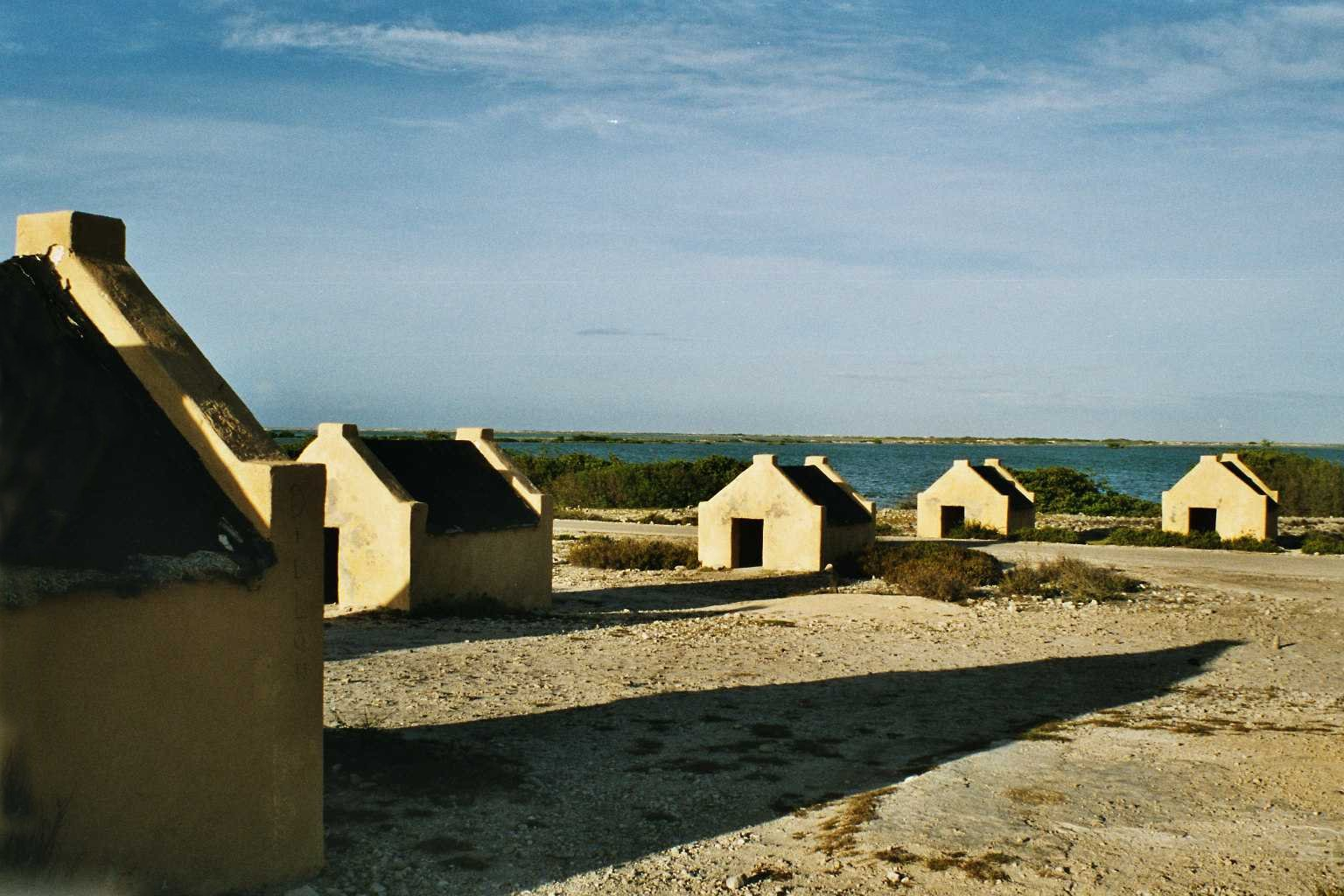
The forced African migrants brought to the Caribbean lived in inhumane conditions. Above are examples of slave huts in Dutch Bonaire. About 5 feet tall and 6 feet wide, between 2 and 3 slaves slept in these after working in nearby salt mines.

The development of agriculture in the Caribbean required a large workforce of manual laborers, which the Europeans created by the forced migration of enslaved Africans to the Americas. The concomitant Atlantic slave trade brought enslaved Africans to Spanish, Portuguese, Dutch, English, and French colonies in the Americas. Enslaved Africans were brought to the Caribbean from the early 16th century until the end of the 19th century, with majority brought between 1701 and 1810.

The following table lists the number of slaves brought into some of the Caribbean colonies:

Caribbean colonizer	1492–1700	1701–1810	1811–1870	Total number of slaves imported
British Caribbean	263,700	1,401,300	—	1,665,000
Dutch Caribbean	40,000	460,000	—	500,000
French Caribbean	155,800	1,348,400	96,000	1,600,200

Abolitionists in the Americas and in Europe became vocal opponents of the slave trade throughout the 19th century. The importation of slaves to the colonies was often outlawed years before the end of the institution of slavery itself. It was well into the 19th century before many slaves in the Caribbean were legally free. The trade in slaves was abolished in the British Empire through the Abolition of the Slave Trade Act in 1807. Slaves in the British Empire continued to remain enslaved, however, until the Parliament of the United Kingdom passed the Slavery Abolition Act 1833. When the Slavery Abolition Act 1833 came into force in 1834, roughly 700,000 slaves in the British West Indies immediately became free; other enslaved workers were freed several years later after a period of apprenticeship which lasted several years. Slavery was abolished in the Dutch Empire in 1814. Spain abolished slavery in its empire in 1811, with the exceptions of Cuba, Puerto Rico, and Santo Domingo; Spain ended the slave trade to these colonies in 1817, after being paid £400,000 by Britain. Slavery itself was not abolished in Cuba until 1886. France abolished slavery in its colonies in 1848.

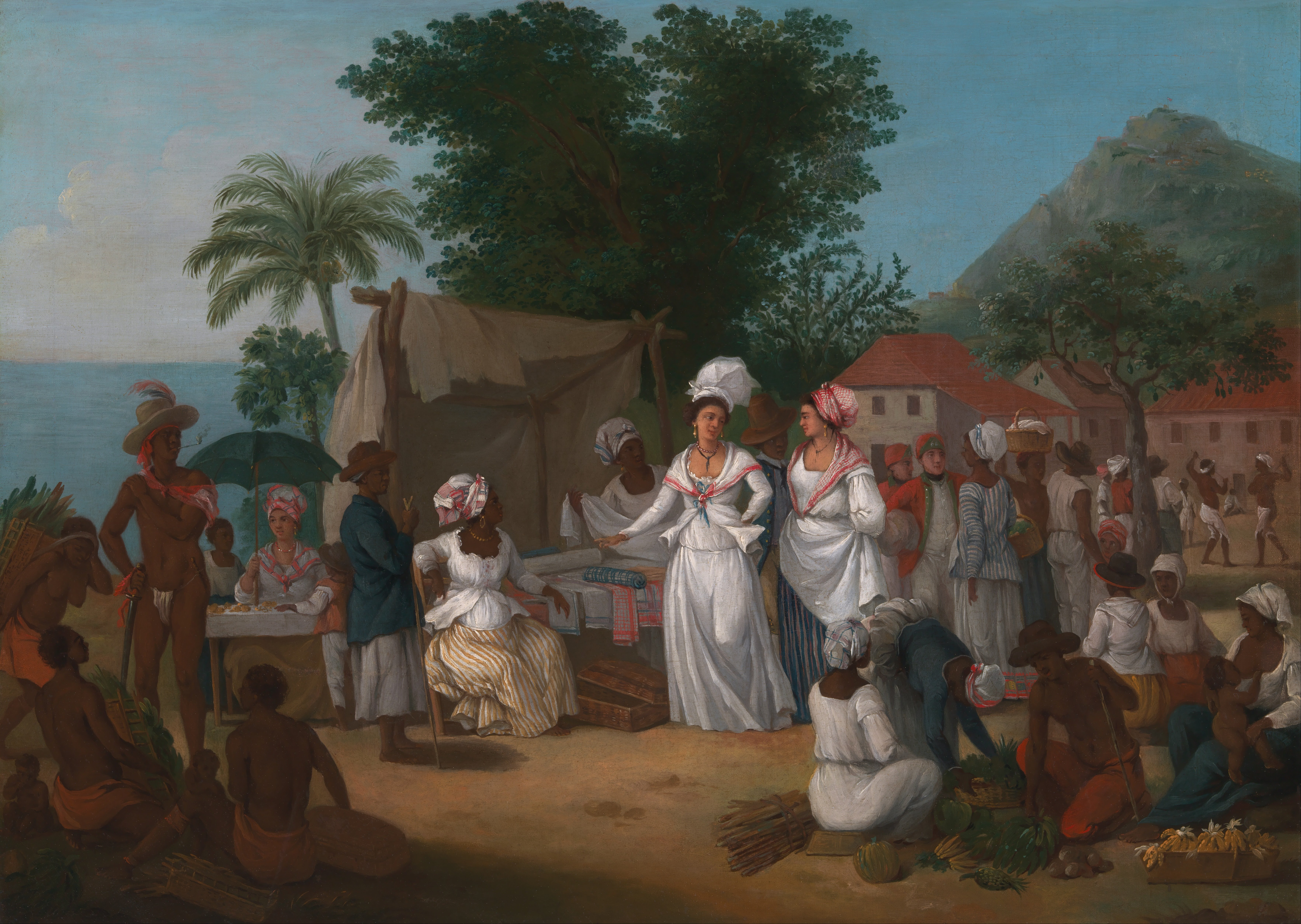
A linen market in the British West Indies, circa 1780

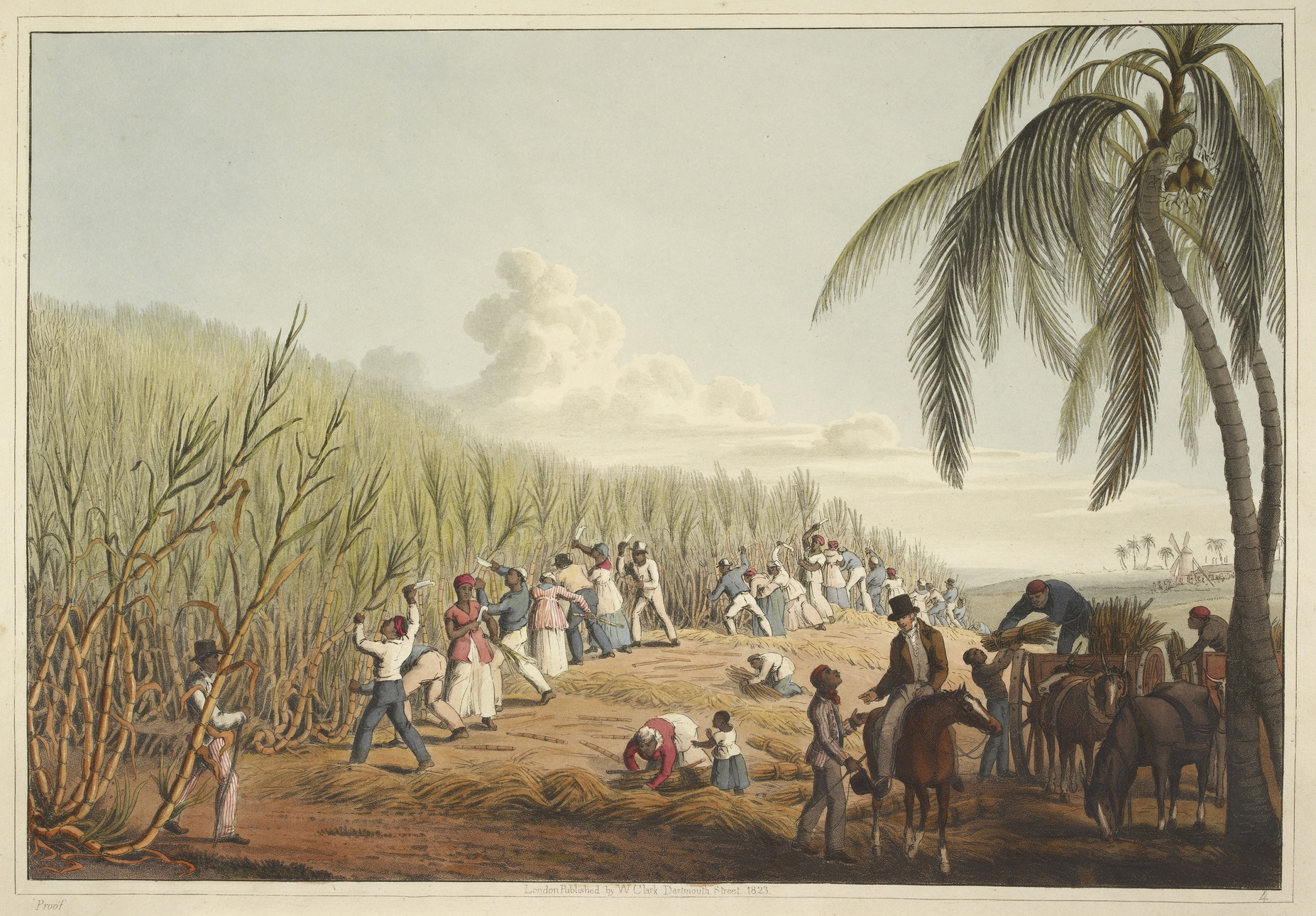
Delaps sugar plantation in the British colony of Antigua, 1823

==== Marriage, separation, and sale together ====
"The official plantocratic view of slave marriage sought to deny the slaves any loving bonds or long-standing relationships, thus conveniently rationalising the indiscriminate separation of close kin through sales." (Note: Plantocratic, of a political order dominated by plantation owners)

"From the earliest days of slavery, indiscriminate sales and separation severely disrupted the domestic life of individual slaves."

Slaves could be sold so that spouses could be sold separately.

"Slave couples were sometimes separated by sale .... They lived as single slaves or as part of maternal or extended families but considered themselves 'married.'"

Sale of estates with "stock" to pay debts, more common in the late period of slavery, was criticised as separating slave spouses. William Beckford argued for "families to be sold together or kept as near as possible in the same neighbourhood" and "laws were passed in the late period of slavery to prevent the breakup of slave families by sale, ... [but] these laws were frequently ignored". "Slaves frequently reacted strongly to enforced severance of their emotional bonds", feeling "sorrow and despair", sometimes, according to Thomas Cooper in 1820, resulting in death from distress. John Stewart argued against separation as leading slave buyers to regret it because of "despair[,] ... utter despondency[,] or 'put[ting] period to their lives'". Separated slaves often used free time to travel long distances to reunite for a night and sometimes runaway slaves were married couples. However, "sale of slaves and the resulting breakup of families decreased as slave plantations lost prosperity."

==== Colonial laws ====
European plantations required laws to regulate the plantation system and the many slaves imported to work on the plantations. This legal control was the most oppressive for slaves inhabiting colonies where they outnumbered their European masters and where rebellion was persistent such as Jamaica. During the early colonial period, rebellious slaves were harshly punished, with sentences including death by torture; less serious crimes such as assault, theft, or persistent escape attempts were commonly punished with mutilations, such as the cutting off of a hand or a foot.

In European colonies in the Caribbean, each colony had to develop laws regulating slavery. British West Indian colonies were able to establish laws regulating the institution through their own local legislatures, and the assent of the colony's governor (who served as a representative of the Crown). In contrast, French, Danish, Dutch and Spanish colonies were strictly controlled by their metropole, including the implementation of slave codes. The French regulated slaves under the Code Noir (Black Code) which was in force in all of France's colonies, and was based upon early French slave practises in the Caribbean colonies.

As noted by American historian Jan Rogozinski, "All [Caribbean] islands sought to protect the planter and not the slave." Slave codes in the British West Indies frequently did not recognize marriage for slaves, family rights, education for slaves, or the right to religious practices such as holidays. The Code Noir recognized slave marriages, but only with the consent of the master, and like Spanish colonial law gave legal recognition to marriages between European men and black or Creole women. They were also more generous than their British counterparts in granting the possibility of manumission to slaves.

==== Slave rebellions ====
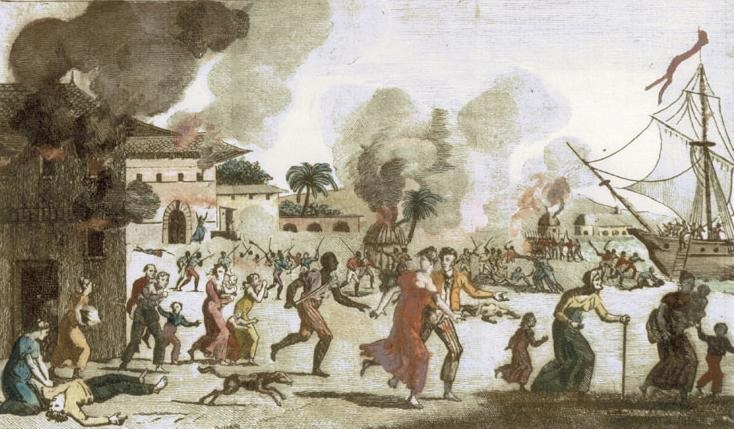
Illustration circa 1815 showing "Incendie du Cap" (Burning of Cape Francais) during the Haitian Revolution. The caption reads: "General revolt of the Blacks. Massacre of the Whites".

The plantation system and the slave trade that enabled its growth led to regular slave resistance in many Caribbean islands throughout the colonial era. Resistance was made by escaping from the plantations altogether, and seeking refuge in the areas free of European settlement. Communities of escaped slaves, who were known as Maroons, banded together in heavily forested and mountainous areas of the Greater Antilles and some of the islands of the Lesser Antilles. The spread of the plantations and European settlement often meant the end of many Maroon communities, although they survived on Saint Vincent and Dominica, and in the more remote mountainous areas of Jamaica, Hispaniola, Martinique and Cuba.

Violent resistance broke out periodically on the larger Caribbean islands. Many more conspiracies intended to create rebellions were discovered and ended by Europeans before they could materialise. Actual violent uprisings, involving anywhere from dozens to thousands of slaves, were regular events, however. Dominican Republic, Jamaica and Cuba in particular had many slave uprisings. Such uprisings were brutally crushed by European forces.

==== Caribbean slave uprisings (1522–1844) ====
The following table lists slave rebellions that resulted in actual violent uprisings:

Caribbean island	Year of slave uprising
Antigua	1701, 1831
Bahamas	1830, 1832–34
Barbados	1816
Cuba	1713, 1729, 1805, 1809, 1825, 1826, 1830–31, 1833, 1837, 1840, 1841, 1843
Curaçao	1795-
Dominica	1785–90, 1791, 1795, 1802, 1809–14
Dominican Republic	1521, 1532–1547, 1542–1546, 1793, 1795, 1796, 1802, 1812, 1844
Grenada	1765, 1795
Guadeloupe	1656, 1737, 1789,1802
Haiti	1791
Jamaica	1673, 1678, 1685, 1690, 1730–40, 1760, 1765, 1766, 1791–92, 1795–96, 1808, 1822–24, 1831–32
Marie Galante	1789
Martinique	1752, 1789–92, 1822, 1833
Montserrat	1776
Puerto Rico	1527
Saint John	1733–34
Saint Kitts	1639
Saint Lucia	1795–96
Saint Vincent	1769–73, 1795–96
Tobago	1770, 1771, 1774, 1807
Tortola	1790, 1823, 1830
Trinidad	1837

== Impact of colonialism on the Caribbean ==
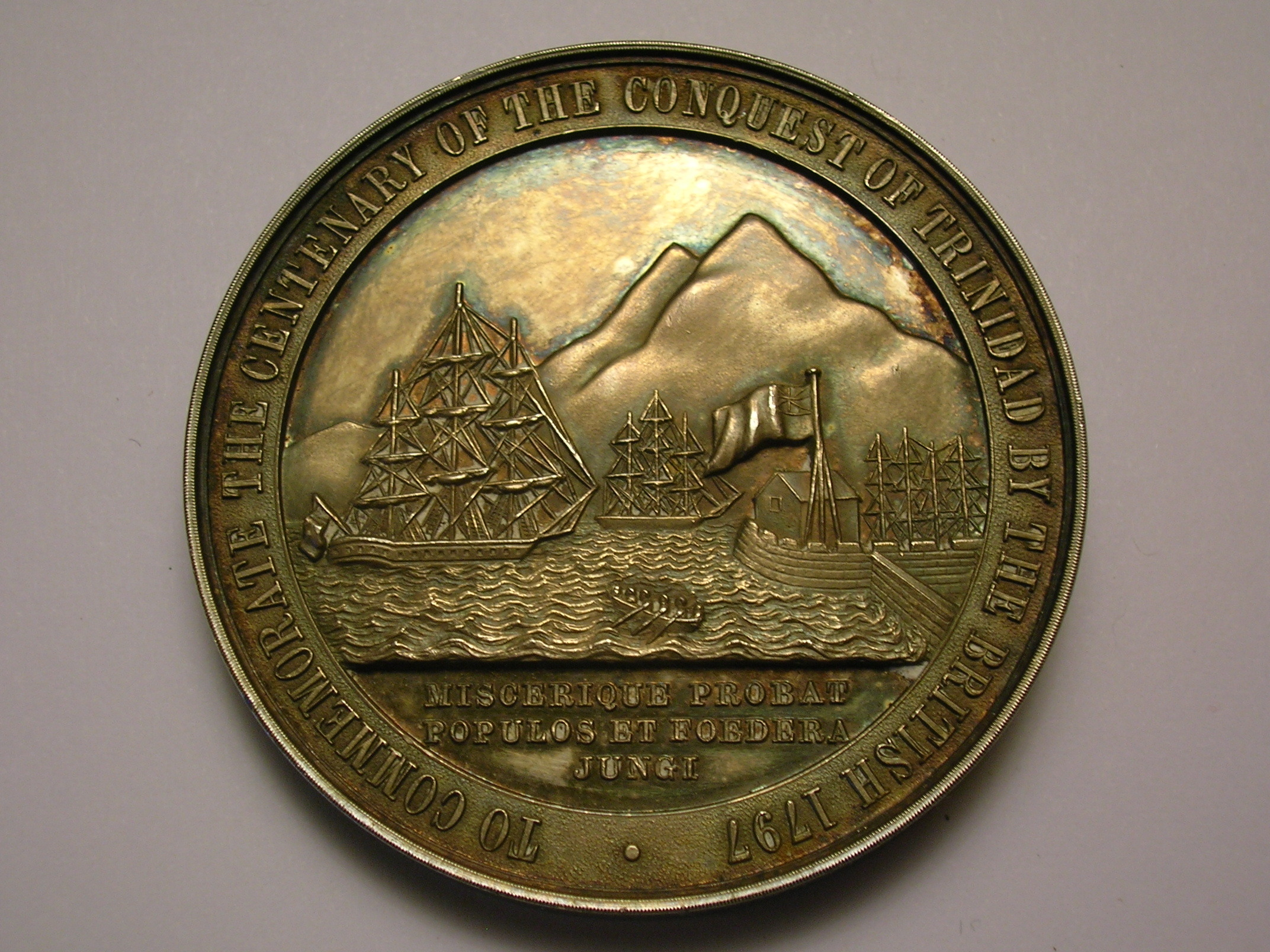
A medallion showing the Capture of Trinidad and Tobago by the British in 1797.

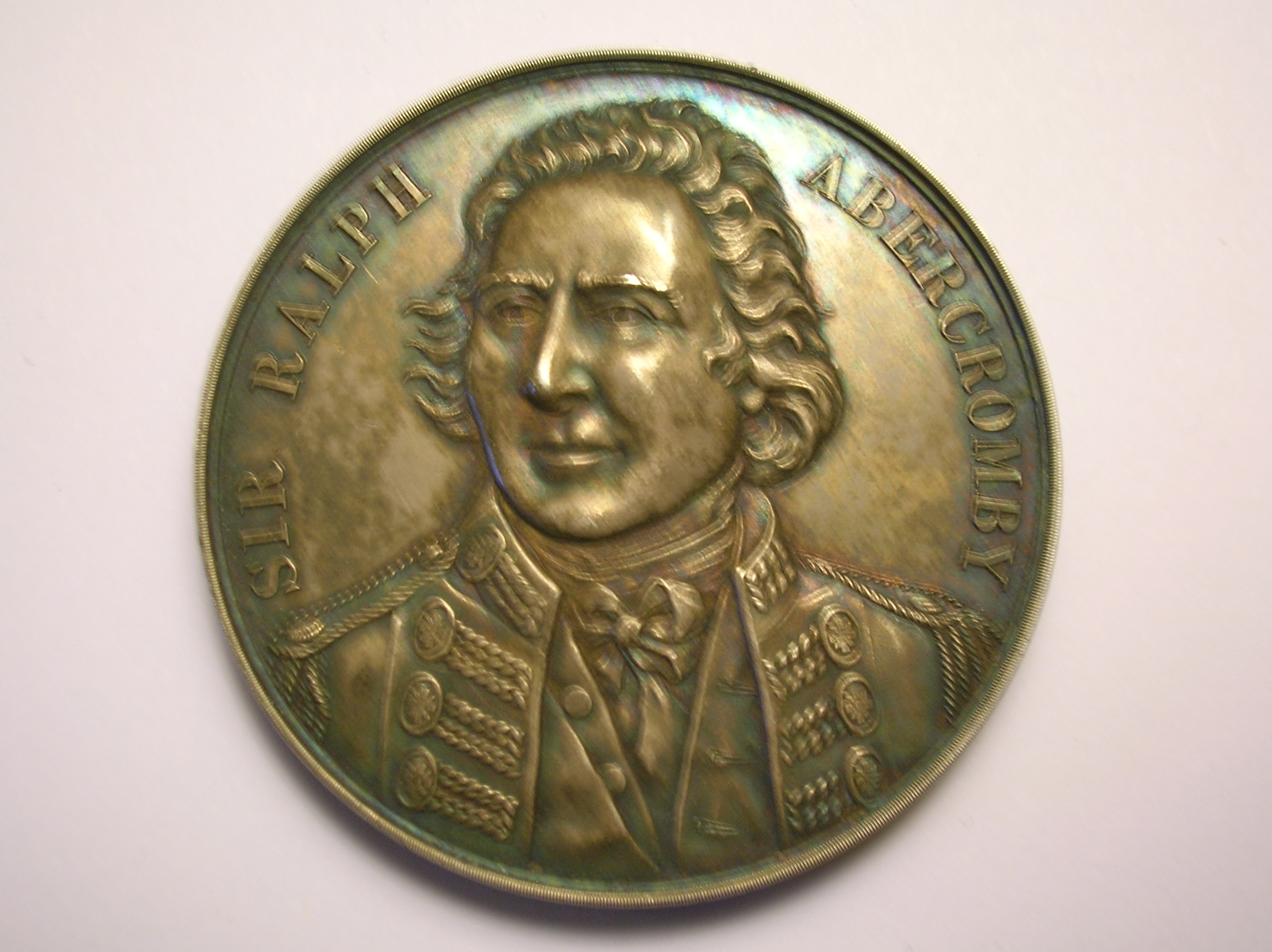
Sir Ralph Abercromby, Commander of the British forces that captured Trinidad and Tobago.

=== Economic exploitation and colonial dependency ===
The extraction of wealth from the Caribbean dates back to the Spanish colonists, starting in the 1490s, who forced indigenous peoples held by Spanish settlers in encomienda to mine for gold. Gold was not the long term motor of the Caribbean economy, but rather the cultivation of cane sugar. Christopher Columbus observed that the islands were favorable for the cultivation of cane sugar, a high value export commodity. The history of export Caribbean agriculture is directly linked with European colonialism. Spaniards replicated of the model of plantation sugar cultivation in the Atlantic islands using forced labor. Sugar was a luxury in Europe prior to the 18th century. With increased production and falling prices, it became widely popular in the 18th century, becoming a necessity in Europe the 19th century. This evolution of taste and demand for sugar as an essential food ingredient unleashed major economic and social changes. Caribbean islands with plentiful sunshine, abundant rainfalls, and no extended frosts were well suited for sugarcane agriculture and sugar factories. With the precipitous decline in the indigenous population during the first years of Spanish colonization, the problem was the lack of labor. Spaniards sought a large and resilient labor force for cultivation of sugar, initiating the large-scale forced migration of enslaved Africans.

The success of Spanish Caribbean sugar plantations was a model for other European powers. The Portuguese colony of Brazil also developed large-scale sugar plantations. The high demand in Europe for sugar attracted other European powers to stake claims on Caribbean islands claimed by the Spanish but not effectively held. In the seventeenth century the Dutch, the English and the French took Caribbean islands and developed plantation agriculture. By the middle of the 18th century, sugar was Britain's largest import which made the Caribbean islands that much more important as colonies. The islands also became bases for European commerce that circumvented Spanish restrictions on the trade monopoly that the Spanish crown sought to impose on its overseas possessions.

Following the abolition of slavery during the 19th century across the Atlantic World, many emancipated Africans left their former masters. This created an economic chaos for the owners of Caribbean sugar cane plantations. The hard work in hot, humid farms required a labor force of strong, low-waged men. The plantation owners looked for cheap labor. This they found initially in China and then in India; the plantation owners subsequently crafted a new legal system of forced labor, which in many ways resembled enslavement. They were indentured laborers, technically not enslaved labor, but the labor regime was harsh. Migrants from the Indian subcontinent began to replace Africans previously brought as slaves, under this indentured labor scheme to serve on sugarcane plantations in European colonies in the Americas and parts of South America. The first ships carrying indentured laborers for sugarcane plantations left India in 1836. Over the next 70 years, numerous more ships brought indentured laborers to the Caribbean, as cheap labor for harsh work. The enslaved labor and indentured laborers - both in millions of people - were brought to the Caribbean, as in other European colonies throughout the world.

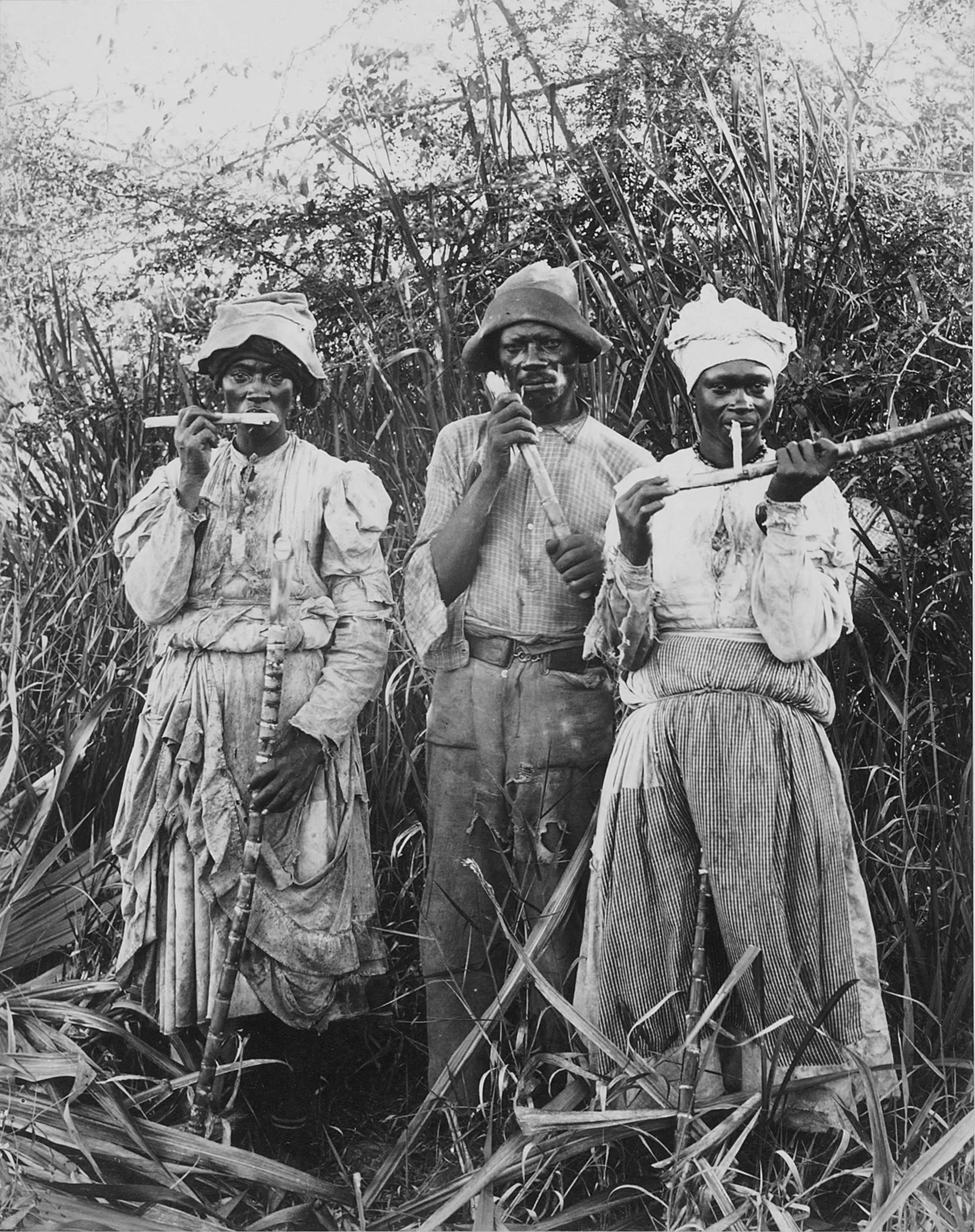
Cane cutters in Jamaica, 1880s.

Export agriculture dominated the island economies, with few cities, and no industrial base. Agricultural workers had no alternative for urban, nonfarming employment. Agricultural laborers' wages were extremely low with no potential for growth, since producers sought to keep labor costs low and their own profits high. Profits from Caribbean agriculture were not converted to industrial development or for the changes in agricultural workers' conditions. As industrialized nations sought cheap sources of food for their industrial working classes, Caribbean islands continued to be the producers of cane sugar. Cane sugar was no longer a high-value commodity only for elites; Caribbean sugar was cheap enough for the industrial working classes to consider it a staple in their diet. It would prove extremely difficult for Caribbean producers to escape from the economic relationship with the developed world that was forged during the colonial era. Caribbean nations were among the world's most impoverished.

=== Wars affecting the Caribbean ===
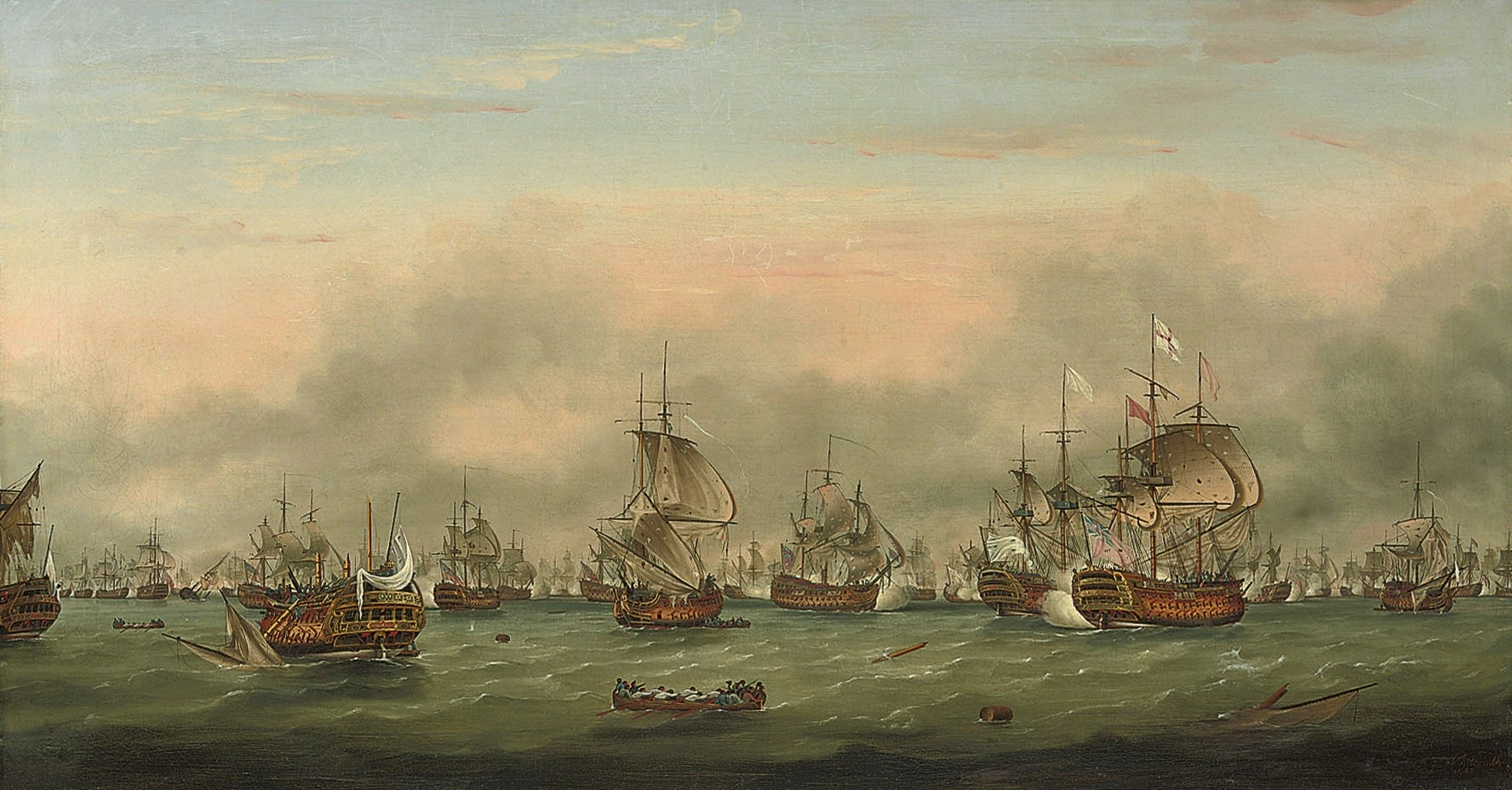
Battle of the Saintes by Thomas Mitchell. This 1782 battle between the British and French navies took place near Guadeloupe.

The Caribbean region was affected by violence and war throughout much of colonial history, but the wars were often based in Europe, with only minor battles fought in the Caribbean.

- Eighty Years' War between the Netherlands and Spain.
- The First, Second, and Third Anglo-Dutch Wars were battles for supremacy.
- Nine Years' War between the European powers.
- The War of Spanish Succession (European name) or Queen Anne's War (American name) spawned a generation of some of the most infamous pirates.
- The War of Jenkins' Ear (American name) or The War of Austrian Succession (European name) Spain and Britain fought over trade rights; Britain invaded Spanish Florida and attacked the citadel of Cartagena de Indias in present-day Colombia.
- The Seven Years' War (European name) or the French and Indian War (American name) was the first "world war" between France, her ally Spain, and Britain; France was defeated and was willing to give up all of Canada to keep a few highly profitable sugar-growing islands in the Caribbean. Britain seized Havana toward the end, and traded that single city for all of Florida at the Treaty of Paris in 1763. In addition France ceded Grenada, Dominica, and Saint Vincent (island) to Britain.
- The American Revolution saw large British and French fleets battling in the Caribbean again. American independence was assured by French naval victories in the Caribbean, but all the British islands that were captured by the French were returned to Britain at the end of the war.
- The French Revolutionary War enabled the creation of the newly independent Republic of Haiti. In addition, in the Treaty of Amiens in 1802, Spain ceded Trinidad to Britain.
- Following the end of the Napoleonic Wars in 1814 France ceded Saint Lucia to Britain, while Britain ceded Martinique back to France in 1815.
- The Spanish–American War (1898) ended Spanish control of Cuba (gained independence in 1902 independent but remained under heavy U.S. influence until 1959 through the Platt Amendment and Cuban–American Treaty of Relations (1903)) and Puerto Rico (which became a U.S. protectorate with Puerto Ricans becoming U.S. citizens in 1917, and Puerto Rico becoming an unincorporated territory of the U.S. in 1952 under the name Estado Libre Asociado (Free Associated State), and heralded the period of U.S. dominance of the islands.
- World War II (1939–1945) impacted the Caribbean as 10,000 men and women left to join the war effort. As part of the British Empire, the colonies were part of the Allies during the war. The Battle of the Caribbean was a theatre of war in the region.

Piracy in the Caribbean was often a tool used by the European empires to wage war unofficially against one another. Gold plundered from Spanish ships and brought to other European nations had a pivotal effect on European interest in colonising the region.

== Independence ==
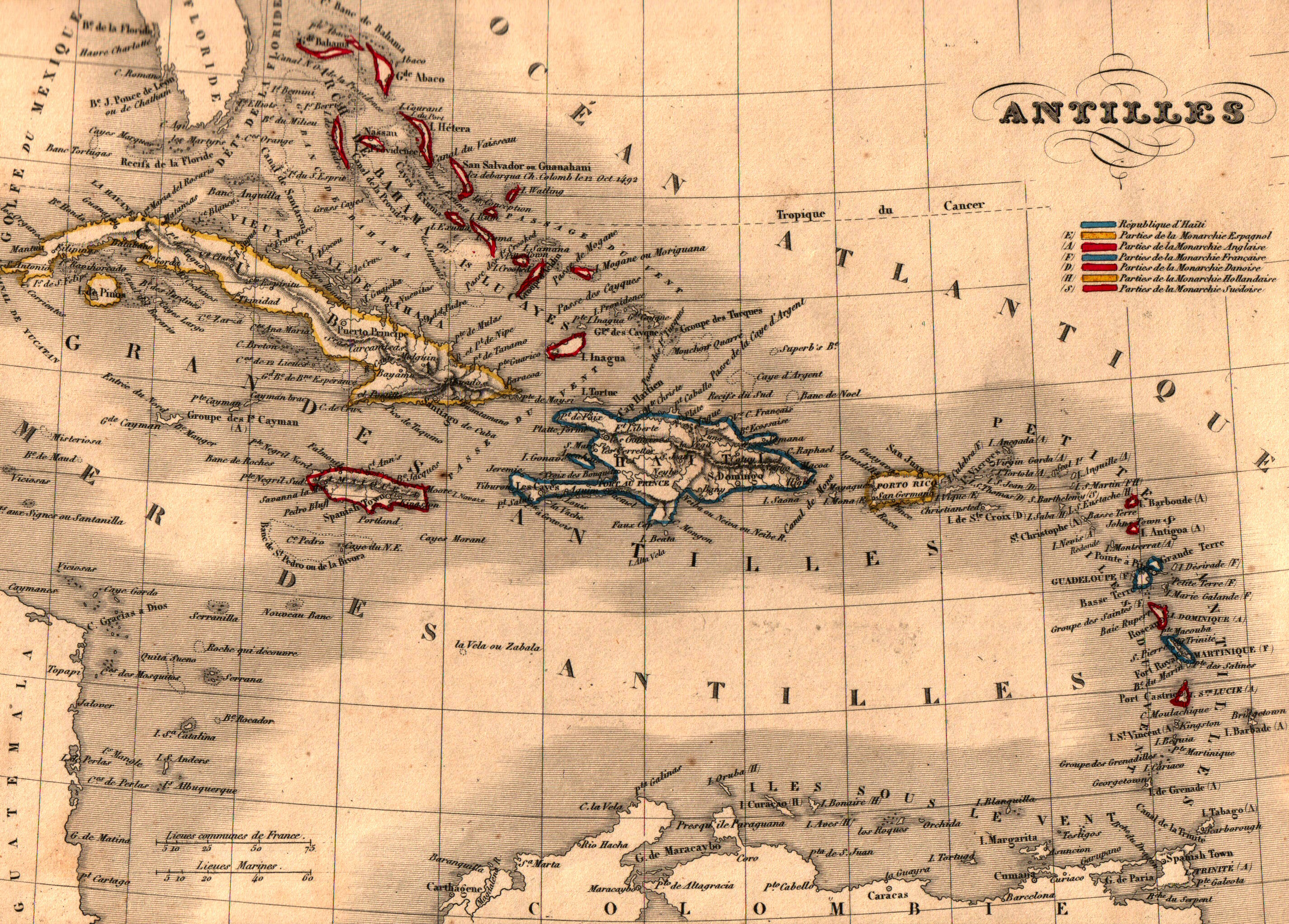
Map of Antilles / Caribbean in 1843.

Haiti, the former French colony of Saint-Domingue on Hispaniola, was the first Caribbean nation to gain independence from European powers in 1804. This followed 13 years of war that started as a slave uprising in 1791 and quickly turned into the Haitian Revolution under the leadership of Toussaint Louverture. Black Haitian revolutionaries overthrew the French colonial government, before becoming the world's first and oldest black republic, and also the second-oldest republic in the Western Hemisphere after the United States. This is additionally notable as being the only successful slave uprising in history. The remaining two-thirds of Hispaniola, Santo Domingo, was declared independent from Spain in 1821. A year later, in 1822, the nation was conquered by Haitian forces. In 1844, the newly formed Dominican Republic declared its independence from Haiti. After a brief return to Spanish rule, the Dominican Republic gained its third and final independence in 1865.

The nations bordering the Caribbean in Central America gained independence with Mexican independence from Spain in 1821 and the establishment of the First Mexican Empire. The region now comprises the modern states of Mexico, Guatemala, El Salvador, Honduras, Nicaragua, and Costa Rica. The nations bordering the Caribbean in South America also gained independence from Spain in 1821 with the establishment of Gran Colombia, comprising the modern states of Venezuela, Colombia, Ecuador, and Panama.

The islands of Cuba and Puerto Rico remained as Spanish colonies until the Spanish–American War in 1898 and they were strategically important to the much-reduced Spanish Empire, which also lost the Philippine Islands to the U.S. in the war. The long civil conflict known in Cuba as the Ten Years' War was hijacked by the U.S. and the treaty signed between the U.S. and Spain ending the war did not include signatories from Cuban independence forces. Cuba was made independent in 1902 and came under U.S. supervision and an economic dependency of the U.S. The 1959 Cuban Revolution broke that economic dependency when Cuba became allied with the Soviet Union. Puerto Rico became an unincorporated territory of the United States, being the last of the Greater Antilles under Spanish colonial control. There are modern advocates for Puerto Rican independence.

Between 1958 and 1962 most of the British-controlled Caribbean was integrated as the new West Indies Federation in an attempt to create a single unified future independent state—but it failed. The following former British Caribbean island colonies achieved independence in their own right; Jamaica (1962), Trinidad and Tobago (1962), Barbados (1966), Bahamas (1973), Grenada (1974), Dominica (1978), St. Lucia (1979), St. Vincent (1979), Antigua and Barbuda (1981), St. Kitts and Nevis (1983).

In addition, British Honduras in Central America became independent as Belize (1981), British Guiana in South America became independent as Guyana (1966), and Dutch Guiana also in South America became independent as Suriname (1975).

== Islands currently under colonial administration ==
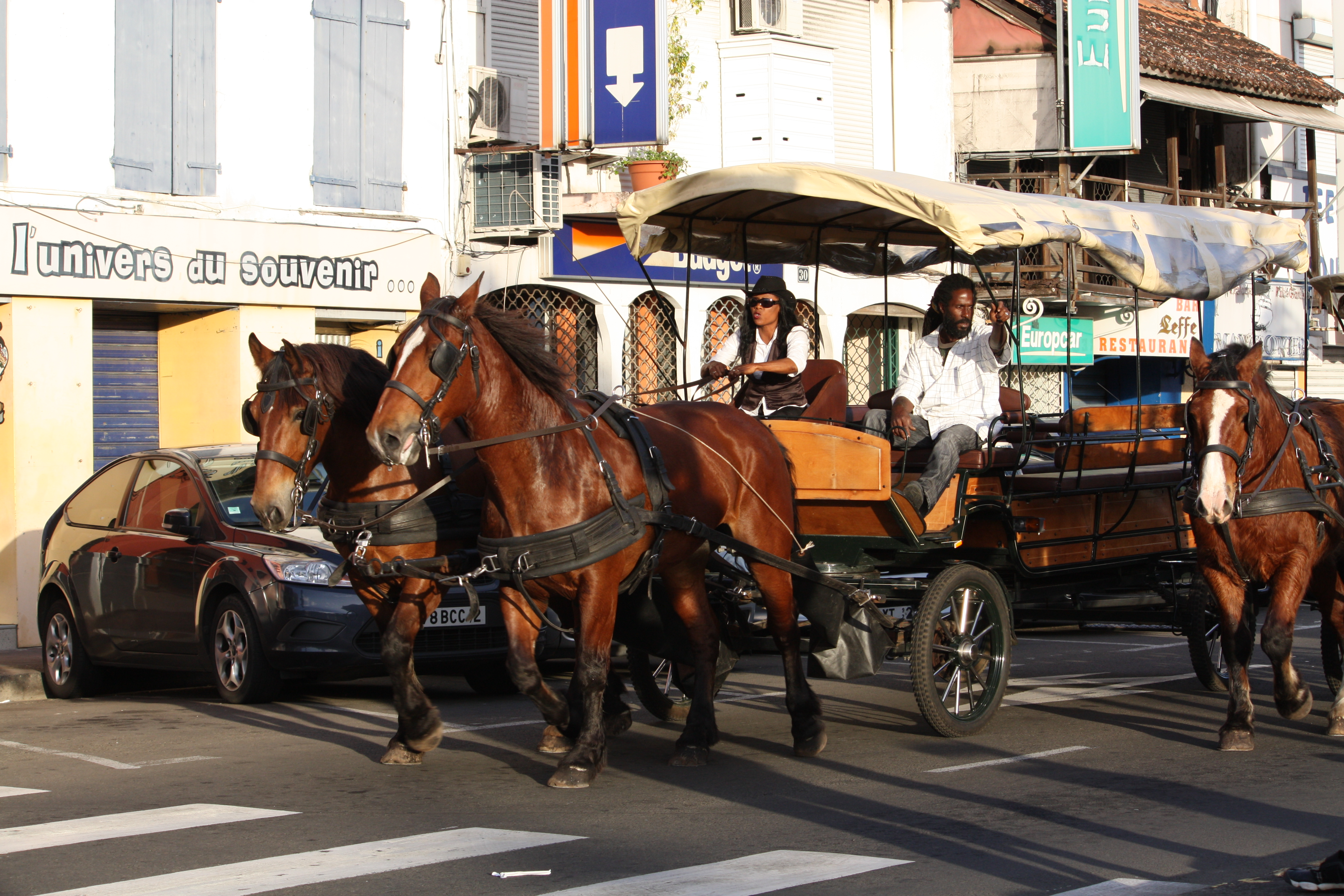
A carriage on a street in Martinique, one of the Caribbean islands that has not become independent. It is an overseas region of France, and its citizens are full French citizens.

Not all Caribbean islands have become independent, as of the early 21st century. A number of islands continue to have government ties with European countries, or with the United States.

French overseas departments and territories include several Caribbean islands. Guadeloupe and Martinique are French overseas departments, a legal status that they have had since 1946. Their citizens are considered full French citizens with the same legal rights. In 2003, the populations of St. Martin and St. Barthélemy voted in favor of secession from Guadeloupe in order to form separate overseas territories of France. After a bill was passed in the French Parliament, the new status took effect on February 21, 2007.

Puerto Rico and the U.S. Virgin Islands are officially territories of the United States, but are sometimes referred to as "protectorates" of the United States. They are self-governing territories subject to Congress plenary powers over the territories.

British overseas territories in the Caribbean include: Anguilla, Bermuda, British Virgin Islands, Cayman Islands, Montserrat, and Turks and Caicos.

Aruba, Curaçao, and Sint Maarten are all presently separate constituent countries, formerly part of the Netherlands Antilles. Along with Netherlands, they form the four constituent countries of the Kingdom of the Netherlands. Citizens of these islands have full Dutch citizenship.

== History of U.S. relations ==
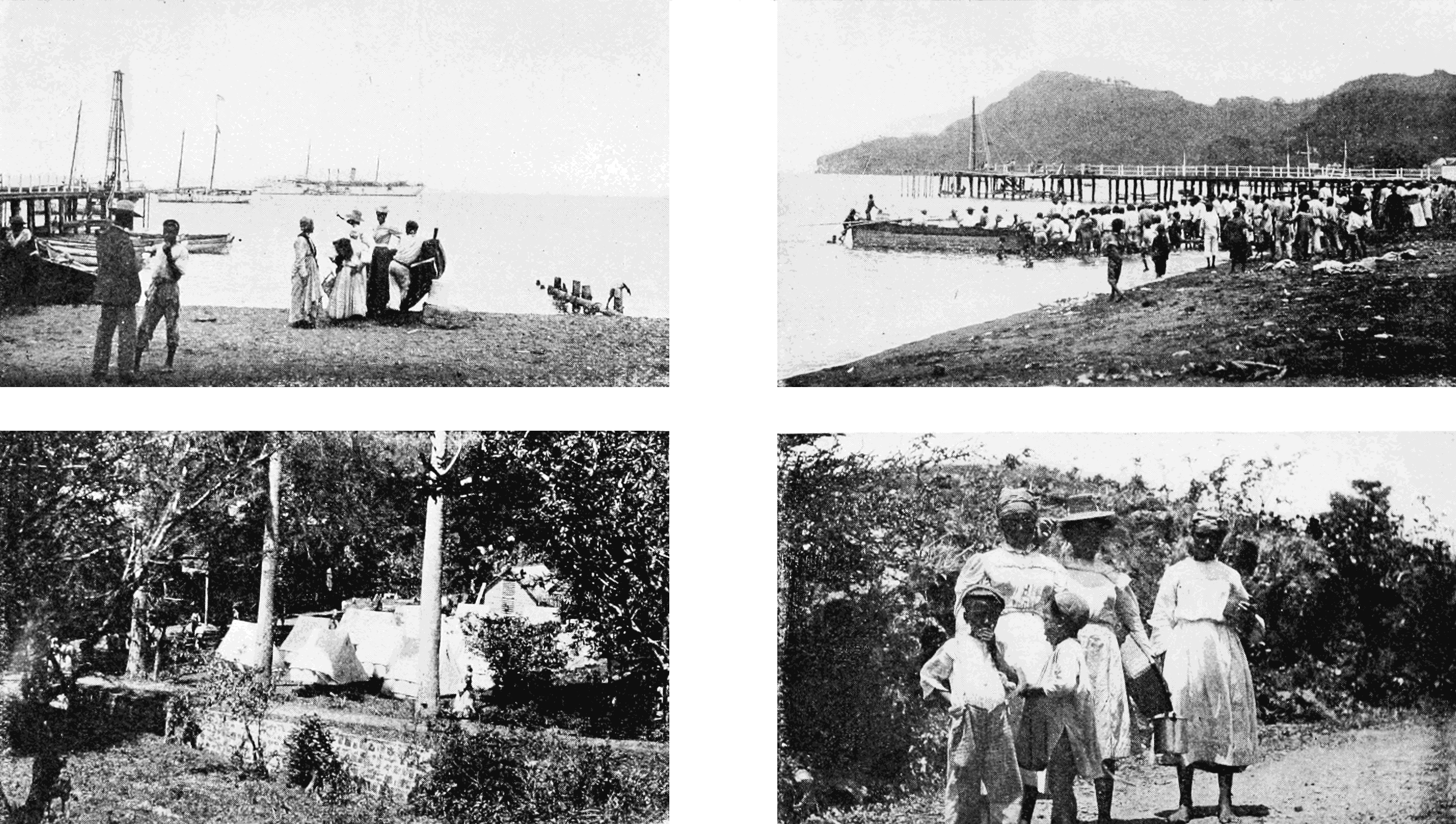
United States' rescue effort at St. Vincent, 1902, following an eruption of the volcano at La Soufrière.

President James Monroe's State of the Union address in 1823 included a significant change to United States foreign policy which later became known as the Monroe Doctrine. In a key addition to this policy called the Roosevelt Corollary, the United States reserved the right to intervene in any nation of the Western Hemisphere it determined to be engaged in "chronic wrongdoing". This new expansionism coupled with the loss of relative power by the colonial nations enabled the United States to become a major influence in the region. In the early part of the twentieth century this influence was extended by participation in The Banana Wars. Areas outside British or French control became known in Europe as "America's tropical empire".

Victory in the Spanish–American War and the signing of the Platt Amendment in 1901 ensured that the United States would have the right to interfere in Cuban political and economic affairs, militarily if necessary. After the Cuban revolution of 1959 relations deteriorated rapidly leading to the Bay of Pigs Invasion, the Cuban Missile Crisis and successive US attempts to destabilise the island. The US invaded and occupied Hispaniola (present day Dominican Republic and Haiti) for 19 years (1915–34), subsequently dominating the Haitian economy through aid and loan repayments. The U.S. invaded Haiti again in 1994 to overthrow a military regime, and restored elected President Jean-Bertrand Aristide. In the 2004, Aristide was overthrown in coup d'état, and flown out of the country by the U.S.. Aristide later accused the U.S. of kidnapping him.

In 1965, 23,000 US troops were sent to the Dominican Republic to intervene into the Dominican Civil War to end the war and prevent supporters of deposed left-wing president Juan Bosch taking over, in what was the first U.S. military intervention in Latin America in more than 30 years. President Lyndon Johnson had ordered the invasion to stem what he claimed to be a "Communist threat", but the mission appeared ambiguous and was condemned throughout the hemisphere as a return to gunboat diplomacy. On October 25 1983 the United States invaded Grenada to remove left-wing leader Hudson Austin, who had deposed Maurice Bishop nine days earlier on October 16. Bishop was executed three days later on the 19th. The United States maintains a naval military base in Cuba at Guantanamo Bay. The base is one of five unified commands whose "area of responsibility" is Latin America and the Caribbean. The command is headquartered in Miami, Florida.

As an arm of the economic and political network of the Americas, the influence of the United States stretches beyond a military context. In economic terms, the United States represents a key market for the export of Caribbean goods. Notably, this is a recent historical trend. The post-war era reflects a time of transition for the Caribbean basin when, as colonial powers sought to disentangle from the region (as part of a larger trend of decolonisation), the US began to expand its hegemony throughout the region. This pattern is confirmed by economic initiatives such as the Caribbean Basin Initiative (CBI), which sought to congeal alliances with the region in light of a perceived Soviet threat. The CBI marks the emergence of the Caribbean basin as a geopolitical area of strategic interest to the US.

This relationship has carried through to the 21st century, as reflected by the Caribbean Basin Trade Partnership Act. The Caribbean Basin is also of strategic interest in regards to trade routes; it has been estimated that nearly half of US foreign cargo and crude oil imports are brought via Caribbean seaways. During wartime, these figures only stand to increase.

The United States is also of strategic interest to the Caribbean. Caribbean foreign policy seeks to strengthen its participation in a global free market economy. As an extension of this, Caribbean states do not wish to be excluded from their primary market in the United States, or be bypassed in the creation of "wider hemispheric trading blocs" that stand to drastically alter trade and production in the Caribbean Basin. As such, the US has played an influential role in shaping the Caribbean's role in this hemispheric market. Likewise, building trade relationships with the US has always figured in strongly with the political goal of economic security in post-independence Caribbean states.

Esencia is a $2 billion imperial development project in the Commonwealth of Puerto Rico that aims to seize more than 800 hectares of land, covering five kilometers of beaches in Punta Melones, Cabo Rojo, by 2028. The United States has long justified its imperial presence in Puerto Rico under the guise of "progress" and "development." With the complicity of a local government that prioritizes American interests, policies like Act 60, which allows foreign investors to evade local and federal taxes, have been implemented.

== Economic change in the 20th century ==
The mainstay of the Caribbean economy, sugar, has declined gradually since the beginning of the 20th century, although it is still a major crop in the region. Caribbean sugar production became relatively expensive in comparison to other parts of the world that developed their own sugar cultivation industries, making it difficult for Caribbean sugar products to compete. Caribbean economic diversification into new activities became essential to the islands.

=== Tourism ===
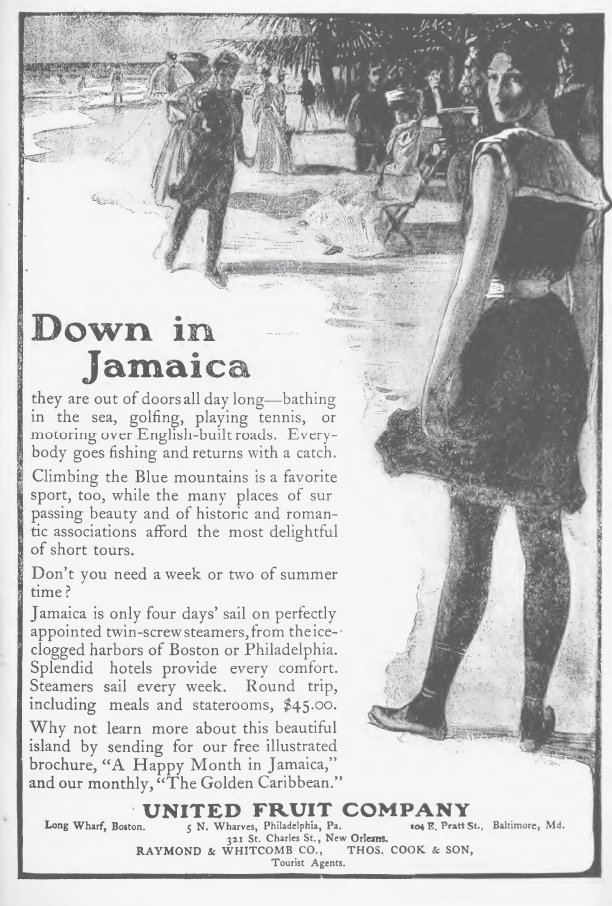
A 1906 advertisement in the Montreal Medical Journal, showing the United Fruit Company selling trips to Jamaica.

By the beginning of the 20th century, the Caribbean islands enjoyed greater political stability. Large-scale violence was no longer a threat after the end of slavery in the islands. The British-controlled islands in particular benefited from investments in the infrastructure of colonies. By the beginning of World War I, all British-controlled islands had their own police force, fire department, doctors and at least one hospital. Sewage systems and public water supplies were built, and death rates in the islands dropped sharply. Literacy also increased significantly during this period, as schools were set up for students descended from African slaves. Public libraries were established in large towns and capital cities.

These improvements in the quality of life for the inhabitants also made the islands a much more attractive destination for visitors. Tourists began to visit the Caribbean in larger numbers by the beginning of the 20th century, although there was a tourist presence in the region as early as the 1880s. The U.S.-owned United Fruit Company operated a fleet of "banana boats" in the region that doubled as tourist transportation. The United Fruit Company also developed hotels for tourist accommodations. It soon became apparent, however, that this industry was much like a new form of colonialism; the hotels operated by the company were fully staffed by Americans, from chefs to waitresses, in addition to being owned by Americans, so that the local populations saw little economic benefit. The company also enforced racial discrimination in many policies for its fleet. Black passengers were assigned to inferior cabins, were sometimes denied bookings, and were expected to eat meals early before white passengers. The most popular early destinations were Jamaica and the Bahamas; the Bahamas remains today the most popular tourist destination in the Caribbean.

Post-independence economic needs, particularly in the aftermath of the end of preferential agricultural trade ties with Europe, led to a boom in the development of the tourism industry in the 1980s and thereafter. Large luxury hotels and resorts have been built by foreign investors in many of the islands. Cruise ships are also regular visitors to the Caribbean.

Some islands have gone against this trend, such as Cuba and Haiti, whose governments chose not to pursue foreign tourism, although Cuba has developed this part of the economy very recently. Other islands lacking sandy beaches, such as Dominica, missed out on the 20th-century tourism boom, although they have recently begun to develop eco-tourism, diversifying the tourism industry in the Caribbean.

=== Financial services ===
The development of offshore banking services began during the 1920s. The close proximity of the Caribbean islands to the United States has made them an attractive location for branches of foreign banks. Clients from the United States take advantage of offshore banking services to avoid U.S. taxation. The Bahamas entered the financial services industry first, and continues to be at the forefront of financial services in the region. The Cayman Islands, the British Virgin Islands, and the Netherlands Antilles have also developed competitive financial services industries. In recent years reduced interest rates and higher costs related largely to anti-money laundering compliance have led to the closure of many correspondent banking arrangements by extra-regional banks.

=== Shipping ===
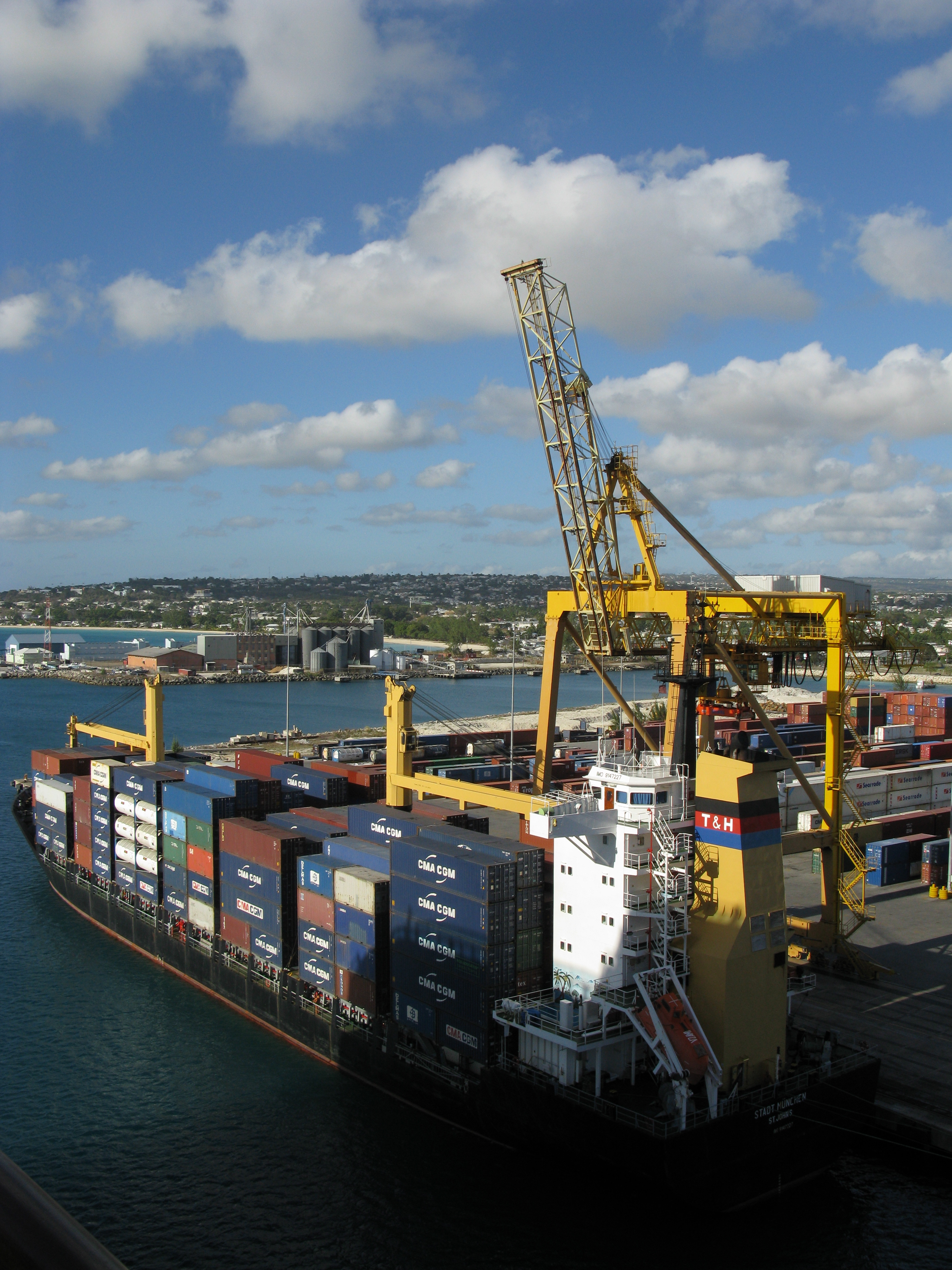
A container ship docked in the deep water harbour of Bridgetown, Barbados, which opened in 1961.

Ports both large and small were built throughout the Caribbean during the colonial era. The export of sugar on a large scale made the Caribbean one of the world's shipping cornerstones, as it remains today. Many key shipping routes still pass through the region.

The development of large-scale shipping to compete with other ports in Central and South America ran into several obstacles during the 20th century. Economies of scale, high port handling charges, and a reluctance by Caribbean governments to privatise ports put Caribbean shipping at a disadvantage. Many locations in the Caribbean are suitable for the construction of deepwater ports for commercial ship container traffic, or to accommodate large cruise ships. The deepwater port at Bridgetown, Barbados, was completed by British investors in 1961. A more recent deepwater port project was completed by Hong Kong investors in Grand Bahama in the Bahamas.

Some Caribbean islands take advantage of flag of convenience policies followed by foreign merchant fleets, registering the ships in Caribbean ports. The registry of ships at "flag of convenience" ports is protected by the Law of the Sea and other international treaties. These treaties leave the enforcement of labour, tax, health and safety, and environmental laws under the control of the registry, or "flag" country, which in practical terms means that such regulations seldom result in penalties against the merchant ship. The Cayman Islands, Bahamas, Antigua, Bermuda, and St. Vincent are among the top 11 flags of convenience in the world. However, the flag of convenience practice has been a disadvantage to Caribbean islands as well, since it also applies to cruise ships, which register outside the Caribbean and thus can evade Caribbean enforcement of the same territorial laws and regulations.

== Timeline ==
- 1492 Spanish arrival on the Lucayan Archipelago, Hispaniola and Cuba.
- 1493 Spanish arrival on Dominica, Guadeloupe, Montserrat, Antigua, Saint Martin, Virgin Islands, Puerto Rico, Jamaica.
- 1496 Spanish foundation of Santo Domingo - colonization of Hispaniola begins.
- 1498 Spanish arrival on Trinidad, Tobago, Grenada, Margarita Island.
- 1499 Spanish arrival on Curaçao, Aruba, Bonaire.
- 1502 Spanish arrival on Martinique.
- 1508 Spanish colonization of Puerto Rico and Aruba begins.
- 1509 Spanish colonization of Jamaica begins.
- 1511 Spanish foundation of Baracoa - colonization of Cuba begins.
- 1520 Spaniards removed last Amerindians from Lucayan Archipelago ( population of 40,000 in 1492 ).
- 1525 Spanish colonization of Margarita Island begins.
- 1526 Spanish colonization of Bonaire begins.
- 1527 Spanish colonization of Curaçao begins.
- 1536 Portuguese arrival on Barbados.
- 1592 Spanish colonization of Trinidad begins.
- 1623 English colonization of Saint Kitts begins.
- 1627 English colonization of Barbados begins.
- 1628 English colonization of Nevis begins.
- 1631 Dutch colonization of Saint Martin begins.
- 1632 English colonization of Montserrat and Antigua begins.
- 1634 Dutch conquest of Spanish Curaçao.
- 1635 French colonization of Guadeloupe begins, while Spain ceded Martinique to France.
- 1636 Dutch conquest of Spanish Aruba and Bonaire.
- 1648 English colonization of The Bahamas begins.
- 1649 French colonization of Grenada begins.
- 1650 English colonization of Anguilla begins.
- 1654 Dutch colonization of Tobago begins.
- 1655 English conquest of Spanish Jamaica.
- 1681 English colonization of Turks and Caicos begins.
- 1697 by Peace of Ryswick, Spain ceded western third of Hispaniola (Haiti) to France.
- 1719 French colonization of Saint Vincent (Antilles) begins.
- 1734 English colonization of Cayman Islands begins.
- 1797 British conquest of Spanish Trinidad.

== See also ==
- Cartography of Latin America
- General History of the Caribbean
- History of the British West Indies
- History of the Greater Caribbean
- Influx of disease in the Caribbean
- Territorial evolution of the Caribbean
- Bussa's rebellion
- Berbice Rebellion
- 1733 slave insurrection on St. John
- Prince Klaas
- Demerara rebellion of 1823
- Denmark Vesey
