= The Dominica Story =

1975 book by Lennox Honychurch

- First edition
- Author: Lennox Honychurch
- Language: English
- Genre: History
- Publisher: Letchworth Press (1975); 51 years ago Macmillan (1995)
- Publication place: Dominica
- Media type: Print (paperback)
- ISBN: 0-333-62776-8 (1995 hardback edition, Macmillan)
- OCLC: 60126665

The Dominica Story: A History of the Island is a history book from 1975, written by Dominican historian Lennox Honychurch. It was the first published history of the island. Originally presented as a miniseries for Radio Dominica (now DBS Radio) in 1974, the inaugural edition covered every aspect of local history from prehistory up to the then-present (the island's 1967 Associated Statehood).

The Dominica Story has been rated one of the "Top 10 Must-Read Books from the Caribbean Region" (alongside The Black Jacobins by C. L. R. James, Beyond Belief by V. S. Naipaul, Wide Sargasso Sea by Jean Rhys, Omeros by Derek Walcott, A Small Place by Jamaica Kincaid, The Arrivants: A New World Trilogy by Kamau Brathwaite, Beyond a Boundary by C. L. R. James, A Bend in the River by V. S. Naipaul, and Annie John by Jamaica Kincaid), with the citation: "To educate the reader about Dominica's and Caribbean history in general, the author combines Dominica's history with geography, environment, folklore, and social customs. The book is regarded as the best book on Dominica's history."

A 1996 review in Caribbean Beat stated: "Dominica is one of the most beautiful and fascinating of Caribbean islands, rugged and mountainous, thickly forested, often mysterious and hard of access. It is lucky to have a chronicler as committed and as able as Lennox Honychurch. ... [The Dominica Story] has become the standard history of the island; now it has been revised and updated in a third edition, with the story brought up the early 1990s. It is readable, well researched, an essential reference not just for thoughtful visitors but for Dominicans."

The book's first edition of 18 chapters was an immediate bestseller upon its release. A revised version with 21 chapters was printed in 1984. A commercial edition, this time with 24 chapters and focusing on local events in the 1980s and 1990s, was published in 1995 by the Caribbean imprint of Macmillan.

== Chapters in the 1995 edition ==
1. An Island of Fire
2. The First Settlers
3. The Kalinago - The "Island Carib"
4. Columbus and Spain
5. Land of Two Nations
6. France Moves In
7. The British in Dominica
8. The Plantation
9. The French Return
10. The Fighting Maroons
11. Revolution and Ransom
12. The Last Maroon War
13. Peace and Freedom
14. The Years of Change
15. An Unsettled Society
16. New Men, New Energy
17. Between Two Wars
18. The Church
19. Development and Welfare
20. After God, The Land
21. Statehood
22. Towards Independence
23. A Stormy Path
24. Inventing a Nation
