= PWI (disambiguation) =

Pro Wrestling Illustrated is an American magazine.

PWI may also refer to:

- Indonesian Journalists Association (Persatuan Wartawan Indonesia), an Indonesian association of journalists
- Perfect World International, a free-to-play MMORPG
- Permanent Way Institution, British professional institution for railway engineering
- Plasma Waves Instrument, an experiment on the NASA mission Dynamics Explorer 1
- Predominantly White Institution, a public college or university in North America that is majority-White and has historically catered to that demographic; see Institutional racism § Impact on students
- Process Window Index, a statistical measure that quantifies the robustness of a manufacturing process
- Public Windows Interface, a Sun initiative to create an open Windows API
- Pune Warriors India, a defunct Indian Premier League team
- Pwi pwi, a type of miniature raft, native to Dominica
