= The Dominica Museum =

National museum of Dominica

Coordinates: 15°17′47″N 61°23′15″W

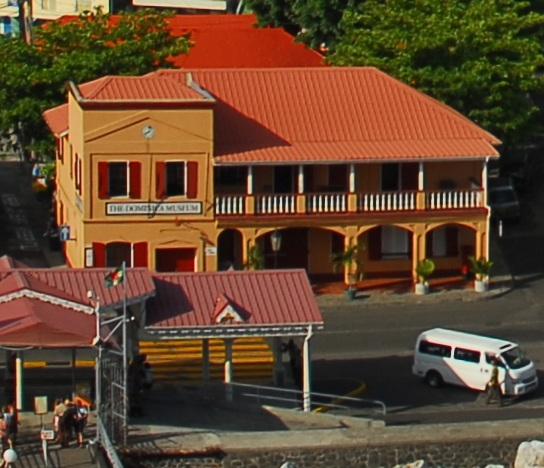
- Location: Roseau, Dominica
- Type: National museum

The Dominica Museum is the national museum of Dominica, an island nation in the Caribbean Lesser Antilles. It is located in the capital, Roseau, on a quay in front of the Old Market of Roseau, which was the centre for slave trading during colonial times. Its building was formerly an old market building and a post office dating to 1810.

== Displays ==
Dominica's most notable historian, Lennox Honychurch, has been responsible for much of the museum. The Dominica Museum contains general items related to the cultural and social history and geology and archeology of Dominica. These include old photographs, photographs and portraits of past rulers, colonial furniture, including a chair and old cabinet and a barometer, specimens of birds and fishes, colonial agricultural items and indigenous cultural articles including the Pwi pwi, a miniature form of raft, a replica of a Carib hut and Arawak pottery and tools. Of note are some stone axes, some of them reaching 9 inches in length. The museums also contains displays related to the Volcanology of the island, and artifacts related to the early settlers also include oars, domestic implements, wooden figurines and old musical instruments.
