= Old Market of Roseau =

Coordinates: 15°17′48″N 61°23′14″W

The Old Market of Roseau, also known as Old Market Plaza and Dawbiney Market Square, is a market located in Roseau, the capital of the Caribbean island of Dominica. Located behind what is today The Dominica Museum on the seafront, it was a thriving market during colonial times and the square was the place where all the major trading between Dominica and the surrounding islands took place, from commodities to slave trading. Public executions were held here. In 1988, the square was renovated as a craft center with shops, to display Dominica crafts. Today it contains stalls selling handcrafted jewelry, T-shirts, spices etc.
