= Hans Christian =

Hans Christian may refer to:

== People ==
- Hans Christian (musician) (born 1960), German-born musician and producer
- Hans Christian Andersen (1805–1875), Danish author and poet
- Hans Christian Gram (1853–1938), Danish bacteriologist
- Hans Christian Ørsted (1777–1851), Danish physicist and chemist
- Hans Christian Hansen (1906-1960), Danish Prime Minister
- Hans-Christian Ströbele (1939–2022), German politician and lawyer
- Hans Christian Blech (1915–1993), German film, stage and television character actor
- Hans Christian Doseth (1958–1984), Norwegian climber
- Hans Christian Thoning (born 1952), Danish politician
- Hans Christian Rosen (1794–1880), Norwegian military officer
- Hans Christian Ægidius (1933–2008), Danish actor
- Hans Christian Knuth (born 1940), German theologian
- Hans Christian Friedrich (1925–1992), German botanist
- Hans Christian Brandy (born 1958), German theologian

== Other uses ==
- Hans Christian Yachts

== See also ==
- Hans Christian Andersen (disambiguation)
