= Dominica Broadcasting Corporation =

National radio station of the Commonwealth of Dominica

Roseau; Dominica
- Broadcast area: Dominica and Eastern Caribbean
- Frequency: 88.1 FM
- Branding: DBS Radio; The Nation's Station

Programming
- Format: Music / Talk / News

Ownership
- Owner: Government of Dominica

History
- First air date: November 1971

Technical information
- Transmitter coordinates: 15.29495°N 61.38544°W

Links
- Website: https://dbcradio.net

Dominica Broadcasting Corporation (also known on-air as DBS or DBS Radio) is the national radio station of the Commonwealth of Dominica. The service, owned by the local government, is headquartered on Victoria Street in the island's capital, Roseau. Broadcast on the 88.1 FM frequency (along with several others across the island nation), DBS' signal is also picked up across the Eastern Caribbean.

The company was founded in 1971 as Radio Dominica, and upon its launch replaced programming provided to the island by WIBS, the Windward Islands Broadcasting Service of Grenada. Programs from DBS over the years have included The Dominica Story (a year before its 1975 publication in book form) and Experience Kwéyòl (Espéwéyans Kwéyòl).

== See also ==
- Kairi FM
- Q95 FM
