= Pearle Christian =

Dominican composer and cultural worker (born 1955)

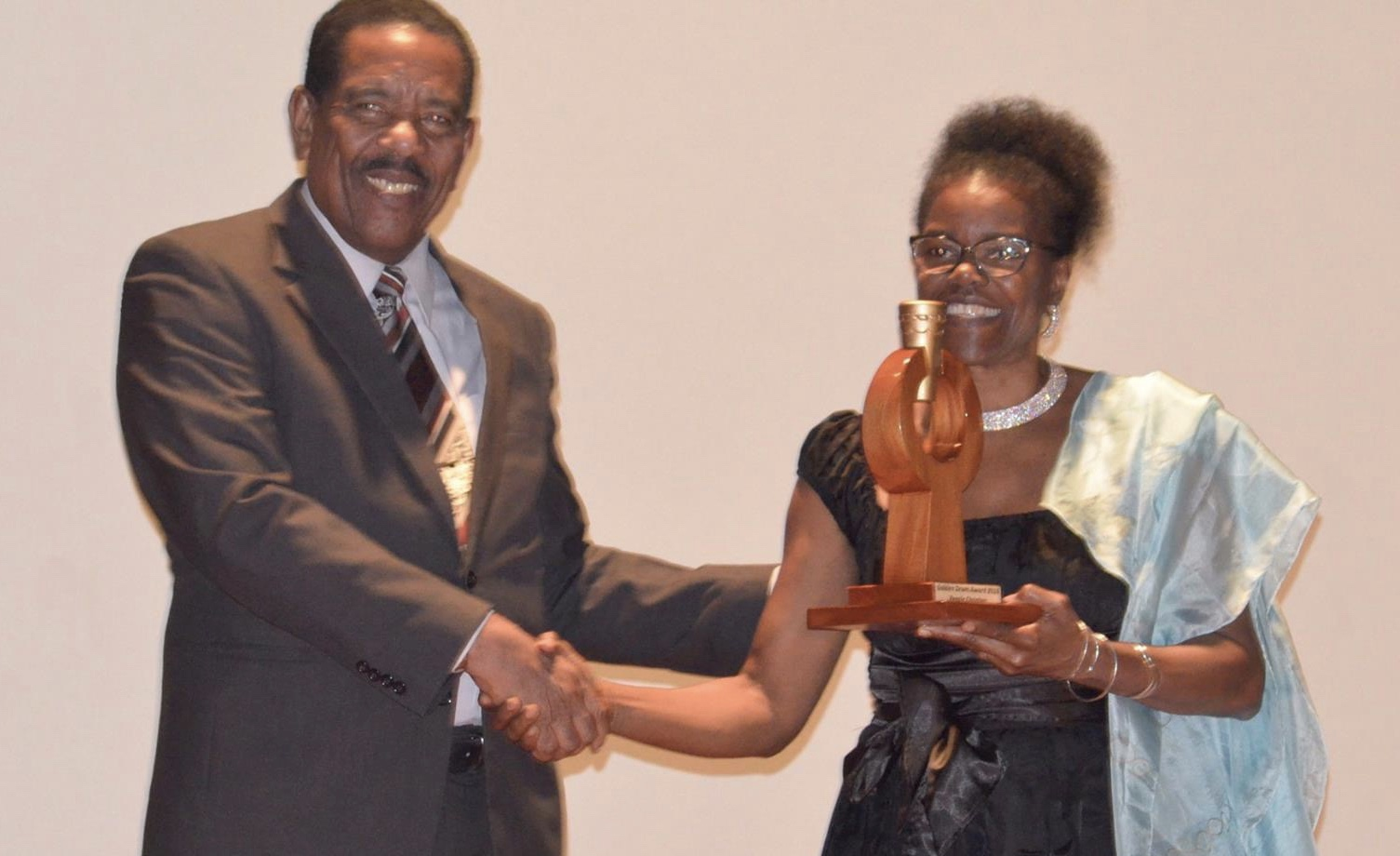
- President Charles Savarin presents the Golden Drum Award to Christian in 2016
- Born: 20 March 1955 (age 71); La Plaine, Dominica, West Indies
- Education: Jamaica School of Music; University of Texas
- Occupations: Music educator, composer, choral music director, and cultural worker
- Parent(s): Muriel Christian (née Mathew); Henckell Christian
- Relatives: L. M. Christian (uncle)
- Awards: Golden Drum Award

Pearle Christian (born 20 March 1955), affectionately known as "Aunty Pearle", is a Dominican music educator, composer, choral music director, and cultural worker, who has been called "one of Dominica's greatest daughters". She was a senior officer in the Cultural Division of the Dominican Government for more than three decades, until 2015. Much of her work has been devoted to exploring the use of Caribbean folk culture as a source for creative expression. She is a niece of Lemuel McPherson Christian (1913–2000), composer of Dominica's national anthem "Isle of Beauty, Isle of Splendour".

== Early years and education ==
Pearle Christian was born in La Plaine, Dominica, to Muriel Christian (née Mathew) and Henckell Christian (who served as Minister of Education and Health in the Dominica government). She was the third child in a family of four girls. At the age of seven, she began learning to play the piano, tutored at the Christian Musical Class by her uncle L. M. Christian, and later studying with Rosemary Cools-Lartigue. Pearle was educated in Roseau at Convent Preparatory School, Convent High School and (from 1972 to 1974) at Sixth Form College. She then worked as a teacher for two years at Convent Prep and Convent High Schools, while continuing her musical education and taking Associated Board of the Royal Schools of Music examinations. She went on to attend (1976–80) the Jamaica School of Music (now Edna Manley College of Visual and Performing Arts), Cultural Training Centre, Kingston, Jamaica, where she earned a Diploma in Music Education. In her third year, she was designated Best Third Year Student, and in her fourth and final year she won awards for Composition and Student of the Year.

== Career ==
After graduating from the Jamaica School of Music in Kingston, Christian was invited to join the staff there, working as a teacher and Junior Choir director (1980–81), before returning to Dominica. In 1981, she was appointed Cultural Officer in the Government of Dominica's Division of Culture, working in a senior position there until she retired in 2015.

Particularly involved with choral music over the years, she was the founding member and manager of the National Chorale for two decades, singing with the Dominica Folk Singers, as well as with her church choir, the St Alphonsus Folk Choir, since her teens. She is also a flute teacher, director of the Junior Choir at Kairi School of Music, Roseau, and the director of the acclaimed Sixth Form Sisserou Singers, which was established in 1994 as a collaborative project between the Division of Culture and the then Sixth Form College.

Christian has composed and staged several children's musicals, and has trained scores of students at the Kairi School of Music, where for 17 years she was a principal tutor.

In 2000, she initiated the founding of the Dominica Association of Music Educators, which is "committed to advocating for every Dominican child regardless of race, colour, creed or economic status, to have an opportunity to participate fully in the beauty of music not simply as a listener, but also as a creator and performer of the art form."

In 2001, she earned a master's degree in Music Education (General Music) from the University of Texas in San Marcos, Texas.

On her retirement in 2015, Christian said that her greatest achievement through the medium of music, choral and instrumental, was that she had been able to provide a "platform for the holistic development of many young people from diverse backgrounds".

In 2016, she received the Golden Drum Award, Dominica's highest cultural honour, for Excellence in Music Education.

== Selected works ==
=== Children's musicals ===
- 1988: Ananse and Fire
- 1989: Song of the Sisserou (written in collaboration with Louis Bertrand)
- 1990: Ananse and the Pusher (written in collaboration with Louis Bertrand)
- 1991: Ananse and the Mirrors (written in collaboration with Louis Bertrand)
- 1992: Maruka (written in collaboration with Louis Bertrand)
- 1994: Mama Ella (written in collaboration with Louis Bertrand)

=== Children's mini-musicals ===
- 2008: Befriending Ma Ziggily
- 2010: Ma Flora, Golden Keeper of the Savannah
- 2012: Mangolia the Mango Tree

== Publications ==
- Caribbean Adventure, co-authored with Michael Burnett (a collection of Caribbean folk songs arranged for classroom ensemble), 1982.
- Reggae Schooldays (a collection of original reggae songs for classroom ensemble), EMI Music Publishing, 1982. ISBN 978-0861752836.
- Sound Pack Vol. 4 — Four Caribbean Pop Songs arranged for Classroom Instruments, 1984.

== Awards ==
- 1987: Certificate of Commendation (for work in music education), Music Lovers Government Band, Dominica
- 2008: Recognition for Outstanding Work in Arts and Culture, Dominica Academy of Arts and Science
- 2008: Meritorious Service Award (in field of culture), Government of Dominica, Roseau, Dominica
- 2010: LIME Creole Lifetime Achievement Award for service in the field of Cultural Development, LIME (Dominica Ltd)
- 2016: Golden Drum Award, for Excellence in Music Education and Promotion of Choral Music
- 2017: ADNExUS Legends Award from the Association of Dominicans in the Northeast USA
