= Ortoiroid people =

Second wave of human settlers of the Caribbean

The Ortoiroid people were the second wave of settlers of the Caribbean who began their migration into the Antilles around 2000 BC. They were preceded by the Casimiroid peoples (~4190-2165 BC). They are believed to have originated in the Orinoco valley in South America, migrating to the Antilles from Trinidad and Tobago to Puerto Rico. The name "Ortoiroid" comes from Ortoire, a shell midden site in southeast Trinidad. They have also been called Banwaroid, after another archaeological site in Trinidad.

== Settlement patterns ==
The Ortoiroid are believed to have developed in South America before moving to the West Indies. The earliest radiocarbon date for the Ortoiroid is 5230 BC from Trinidad. The two earliest Ortoiroid archaeological sites in Trinidad are the Banwari Trace and at St. John's Road, South Oropouche, which date back at least to 5500 BC. At this time, Trinidad might have still been connected to the South American mainland. Ortoiroid peoples settled on Saint Kitts from 2000 BC to 400 BC.

The majority of sites associated with the Ortoiroid are found near or on the coasts. Tobago has at least one Ortoiroid site, Martinique has two, and Antigua has 24 Ortoiroid shell midden sites. These deposits, consisting of discarded shells, bone tools, and stone tools, represent the extended use of mollusks as a food source, as well as the use of stone and bone tools by human inhabitants. They are considered to belong to the Ortoiroid culture.

In the north, two distinct Ortoiroid subcultures have been identified: the Coroso culture, which flourished from 1500 BC–200 AD, and the Krum Bay culture, which spanned 1500—200 BC. The Coroso people lived on the island of Puerto Rico, where the oldest known site is the Angostura site, dating from 4000 BC. The Krum Bay people lived in the Virgin Islands. Krum Bay culture, which emerged between 800 BC and 225 BC, also extended to St. Thomas. The Ortoiroid are considered the first settlers of the archipelago of Puerto Rico.

== Culture ==
The Ortoiroid were hunter-gatherers. Shellfish remains have been found at Ortoitoid sites indicating that they constituted an important part of the diet. Their diet also included turtles, crabs, and fish. They were known for their lithic technology but did not have ceramics. Ortoiroid artifacts include bone spearpoints, perforated animal teeth worn as jewelry, and stone tools, such as manos and metates, net sinkers, pestles, choppers, hammerstones, and pebbles used for grinding.

Ortoiroid people lived in caves and the open. They buried their dead in the soil beneath shell middens. Red ochre was found at some sites and may have been used for body paint.

== Decline ==
The Ortoiroid were displaced by the Saladoid people in the West Indies. In many regions, they disappeared by approximately 400 BC; however, the Coroso culture survived until 200 AD.

== See also ==
- History of the Caribbean
- History of Puerto Rico
- Indigenous peoples of the Americas
