= Lemuel McPherson Christian =

Dominican music educator and composer (1913–2001)

L. M. Christian MBE
- Born: Lemuel McPherson Christian; 1 May 1913; Saint Kitts
- Died: 12 June 2000 (aged 87); Roseau, Dominica
- Occupations: Music educator, secretarial professor and composer
- Known for: Composer of the national anthem of Dominica; founder of Christian Musical Class and Secretarial School, first music school in the Eastern Caribbean
- Parent(s): William Matthew Christian and Beryl Christian (nee Jones)
- Relatives: Henckell Christian (brother) Pearle Christian (niece) Gabriel J. Christian, Esq. (nephew) Wendell M. Christian (brother)
- Awards: Golden Drum Award

Lemuel McPherson Christian MBE (1 May 1913 – 12 June 2000), widely referred to as L. M. Christian, was a Dominican music educator and composer, who wrote the music for "Isle of Beauty, Isle of Splendour", the national anthem of the Commonwealth of Dominica, the words being written by Wilfred Oscar Morgan Pond (1912–1985). Also a music teacher, Christian ran the first music school in the Eastern Caribbean.

== Biography ==
=== Early years ===
Lemuel McPherson Christian was born on 1 May 1913 on the island of Saint Kitts, to parents from Antigua, Beryl and William Matthew Christian. William Christian (1879–1961) was serving as a police sergeant in the Leeward Islands Police Force, and Lemuel (one of eight children born to his mother, the others being Edris, Henckell, Ruby, Wendell, Floss, Clement and Daisy) went to Dominica as a child with his parents, in 1918.

Encouraging Lemuel's early passion for music, his parents bought him a guitar on which to develop his talent, and he would go on to master 25 instruments. By 1935, he established, together with his older brother Henckell and sister Ruby, the Christian Family Orchestra.

=== Christian Musical Class and Commercial School ===
In 1944, L. M. Christian opened the Christian Musical Class, the first music school in the Eastern Caribbean, which he ran in conjunction with typing classes, opening the Christian Commercial Class in 1960. The Christian Musical Class is considered one of Dominica's most significant contributions to music education.

=== National anthem of Dominica ===
Alongside lyrics by Wilfred Oscar Morgan Pond (1912–1985), Christian's music for "Isle of Beauty, Isle of Splendour" was adopted as the national anthem in 1967 when Dominica achieved statehood status within the British Commonwealth, being retained upon the country's independence in 1978.

== Honours and recognition ==
Christian was appointed a Member of the Most Excellent Order of the British Empire (MBE) in the 1966 Queen's Birthday Honours for services to music education in Dominica.

He also received the Sisserou Award of Honour in the 1970s, and the in 1994 the Golden Drum Award, Dominica’s highest honour for achievement in the arts.

"Isle of Beauty, Isle of Splendour", with Christian's music score, was listed by The Guardian as one of the 10 best national anthems of countries competing at the 2008 Beijing Olympics.

Christian was inducted into the Hall of Fame of St Luke's Primary School.

== Family life ==
Christian passed on his love of music to his children, all of whom became professional musicians, including his daughters Peganini, Palestrina, and Verdi, and his sons Handel and Purcell. In 2013, Purcell Christian received a Golden Drum Award, Dominica's highest cultural award, "for giving praise-worthy service work in music education and performance".

L. M. Christian's siblings included Wendell McKenzie Christian (1921–2011, father of Gabriel J. Christian) and Henckell Christian, who was the father of music educator and composer Pearle Christian and served as Minister of Education and Health in the Dominica government.

L. M. Christian died in Roseau, Dominica, on 12 June 2000, aged 87.
