= Lennox Honychurch =

Dominican historian and politician (born 1952)

- Born: 27 December 1952 (age 73); Portsmouth, Dominica, West Indies
- Education: St. Hugh's College, Oxford University
- Occupations: Historian, politician, artist, curator
- Notable work: The Dominica Story (1975)
- Relatives: Elma Napier (grandmother)
- Awards: Golden Drum Award; Anthony N. Sabga Caribbean Awards for Excellence; Dominica Award of Honour
- Website: lennoxhonychurch.com

Lennox Honychurch (/ˈhʌnitʃɜːrtʃ/ HUN-ee-church; born 27 December 1952) is a Dominican historian and politician. He wrote 1975's The Dominica Story: A History of the Island, the 1980s textbook series The Caribbean People, and the 1991 travel book Dominica: Isle of Adventure. Also an artist and a curator, he was largely responsible for compiling the exhibit information for The Dominica Museum in Roseau. Honychurch is the grandson of writer and politician Elma Napier.

== Biography ==
Born in Portsmouth, in Saint John Parish, Dominica, Lennox Honychurch can trace his lineage in the Caribbean back to the 1790s.

Honychurch attended the St. Mary's Academy secondary school. After publishing several works on the history of Dominica, he was awarded the Chevening Scholarship to study at Oxford University, where he gained a PhD at St. Hugh's College. He read for his MPhil and PhD in Anthropology and Museology in 1995.

Honychurch's first job in the early 1970s was as a radio journalist, enabling him to reach out to locals about the island's history with a series of radio vignettes.

Honychurch has also worked as an actor, including having a role in the 1991 television miniseries The Orchid House, produced and directed by Horace Ové, based on the novel of the same name by Phyllis Shand Allfrey.

Honychurch serves as a board member and founder of the Museum Association of the Caribbean. He was instrumental in setting up Dominica's national museum, The Dominica Museum in Roseau, and has consulted at other museums and heritage sites throughout the Caribbean, including Betty's Hope plantation in Antigua, Fort Frederick in Grenada and Fort Charlotte in St Vincent. He is developing an ecology and heritage center in the history buildings around Fort Shirley, an 18th-century garrison in Dominica's Cabrits National Park. This work includes training tour guides and providing education on sustainable, responsible tourism for communities around heritage sites.

=== Political career ===
Honychurch served as a senator in the House of Assembly of Dominica from 1975 to 1979, as a member of the Dominica Freedom Party (DFP). When the DFP formed the government in 1980, he also served as Press Secretary to The Government of Dominica until 1981.

=== Work as historian ===
Honychurch's writing describes the history of Dominica and includes The Dominica Story: A History of the Island, first published in 1975, Dominica: Isle of Adventure, published in 1991, a three-book series entitled The Caribbean People (1995), Dominica's Cabrits and Prince Rupert's Bay (2013), and In the Forests of Freedom: The Fighting Maroons of Dominica (2017).

Honychurch has published several academic articles and he organized the first international conference on Dominican writer Jean Rhys in 2004.

Honychurch is an expert in the First Peoples of the Caribbean and has collected archival material related to Amerindian-African contact. His graduate theses focused on the contact and culture exchange that took place between the indigenous Kalinago people of the Lesser Antilles and the people who arrived from Europe and Africa.

=== Work as artist ===
Honychurch is a poet and painter. His murals adorn churches throughout Dominica, the main post office in Roseau, and the national museum. He is also a carnival artist.

== Awards ==
On 9 April 2011, Honychurch was awarded the Anthony N. Sabga Caribbean Awards for Excellence, in the category of Arts and Letters.

In 2012, he was awarded an honorary doctorate by the University of the West Indies and is an Honorary Research Fellow at the university.

He is a recipient of the Sisserou Award of Honour (1987), as well as the Golden Drum Award (1994) for preservation of Dominica's cultural heritage, and in 2018, he received the Dominica Award of Honour, the nation's highest honour, for his contribution to historical and archaeological research.

== Selected writings ==
- The Dominica Story: A History of the Island (1975)
- Dominica: Isle of Adventure (1991)
- Caribbean Camera: A Journey Through the Islands (1992)
- The Caribbean People (three-book series; 1995)
- Dominica's Cabrits and Prince Rupert's Bay (2013)
- In the Forests of Freedom: The Fighting Maroons of Dominica (Papillote Press, 2017), ISBN 9780993108662
- Resistance, Refuge, Revival: The Indigenous Kalinagos of Dominica (Papillote Press, 2024), ISBN 9781739130329
