= Ortoire (archaeological site) =

Archeological site in Trinidad

Ortoire, in Trinidad, is the archaeological type site for the Ortoiroid people, immigrants to the Antilles around 2000 BCE.

It is a shell midden site in southeast Trinidad.

The site is actually made up of five small sites located along a small strip of land between the ocean and a mangrove swamp which were excavated in 1953 by Irving Rouse. Rouse found manos, flattened mano-pestles made from Antillean stone, a grinding stone, bone points and fish and animal remains. Also excavated were quartz and chert chips and red ochre pebbles. The site was dated to 800 BCE.

The Ortoiroid peoples, migrants who reached Antigua Island by canoe from modern Venezuela, probably around 5,000 BCE, are named after the Ortoire site.

The site, from the late Archaic Period, is one of the best known archaeological sites on Trinidad. It is on the east coast of the island, near the mouth of the Ortoire River, and made up of mostly bivalves including donax clams and Tivela trigonella. There was evidence of cooking at the site - clay hearths with ash and charcoal and burned shells, bones, and stones that had been cracked by heat.

== See also ==
- Banwari Trace, another shell midden site of Ortoiroid people in southeastern Trinidad, explored later (1969) but older, in fact the oldest archaeological site in the Caribbean, dating to perhaps 7,200 BCE
