= Frank Christian =

Frank Christian may refer to:

- Frank Christian (trumpeter) (1887–1973), American jazz trumpeter
- Frank Christian (singer-songwriter) (1952–2012), American singer-songwriter
- Frank Christian (NASCAR owner) (1910–1969), American NASCAR race car owner
- Frank Christian (politician) (1911–1988), Canadian Member of Parliament
- Frank LaMar Christian (1876–1955), warden of Elmira Correctional Facility

== See also ==
- Francis Joseph Christian (born 1942), American bishop
