= Hans Christian Andersen (disambiguation) =

Hans Christian Andersen (1805–1875) was a Danish author and poet.

Hans Christian Andersen may also refer to:

== Places ==
- Hans Christian Andersen Airport, small airport servicing the Danish city of Odense
- Instituto Hans Christian Andersen, Chilean high school located in San Fernando, Colchagua Province, Chile
- Hans Christian Andersen Museum, series of museums/houses in Odense, Denmark

== Art, entertainment, and media ==
- Hans Christian Andersen (film), a 1952 musical film starring Danny Kaye
  - Hans Christian Andersen (Danny Kaye album), an album by Danny Kaye featuring song from the above film
- The World of Hans Christian Andersen (1968), a Japanese anime fantasy film from Toei Doga, based on the works of Danish author Hans Christian Andersen
- I'm Hans Christian Andersen, a 1994 album by Franciscus Henri
- Hans Christian Andersen: My Life as a Fairytale (2001), a television mini-series that fictionalizes the young life of Hans Christian Andersen

== Awards ==
- Hans Christian Andersen Award, a prize awarded by the International Board on Books for Young People
- Hans Christian Andersen Literature Award, Danish literary award established in 2010

== Sports ==
- Hans Christian Andersen (equestrian) (1914-1993), Danish Olympic equestrian
- Hans Christian Andersen Marathon, a marathon in Odense, Denmark, established in 2000

== See also ==
- HC Andersen (beer), a brand used by Albani Brewery
