= Banwari Trace =

Archaeological site in Trinidad and Tobago

Banwari Trace, an Archaic (pre-ceramic) site in southwestern Trinidad, is the oldest archaeological site in the Caribbean. The site has revealed two separate periods of occupation; one between 7200 and 6100 BP (Strata I and II) and the other between 6100 BP and 5500 BP.

== Origins ==
Dated to about 5000 BCE or 7000 B.P (years Before Present), the archaeological site at Banwari Trace in southwestern Trinidad is the oldest pre-Columbian site in the West Indies. At this time, Trinidad was still part of South America. Archaeological research of the site has also shed light on the patterns of migration of Archaic (pre-ceramic) peoples from mainland South America to the Lesser Antilles via Trinidad between 5000 and 2000 BCE.

== Discovery ==
In November 1969, the Trinidad and Tobago Historical Society discovered the remains of a human skeleton at Banwari Trace. Lying on its left-hand side, in a typical Amerindian “crouched” burial position along a northwest axis, Banwari Man (as it is now commonly called) was found 20-cm below the surface. Only two items were associated with the burial, a round pebble by the skull and a needlepoint by the hip. Banwari Man was apparently interred in a shell midden and subsequently covered by shell refuse. Based on its stratigraphic location in the site’s archaeological deposits, the burial can be dated to the period shortly before the end of occupation, approximately 3,400 BC or 5,400 years old.

This skeleton is considered to be the oldest one found in the Caribbean. This demonstrates the presence of the Caribbean's first inhabitants.

== Artifacts found ==
The Banwarian preceramic assemblage is highly distinctive, typically consisting of artifacts made of stone and bone. Objects associated with hunting and fishing include bone projectile points, most likely used for tipping arrows and fish spears, beveled peccary teeth used as fishhooks, and bipointed pencil hooks of bone which were intended to be attached in the middle of a fishing-line. A variety of ground stone tools were manufactured for the processing of vegetable foods, including blunt or pointed conical pestles, large grinding stones and round to oval manos. It should not be confused with the Ortoiran assemblage, which was ca BC 1000 and located in southeast Trinidad.

== Recognition ==
In 2004, Banwari Trace was included in the 2004 World Monuments Watch, by the World Monuments Fund, a private international organization. It was hoped that listing would help garner the financial and technical support necessary to properly survey, document, preserve, interpret, and protect the site.

== See also ==
- Ortoiroid people
- Ortoire (archaeological site)
- History of Trinidad and Tobago
