= John Christian =

John Christian may refer to:

- John Christian (dancer) (1921–1982), American dancer and director of Jacob's Pillow
- John Christian (Deemster) (1776–1852), First Deemster of the Isle of Man
- John Christian (MP) for Colchester (UK Parliament constituency) (1391–1395)
- John Christian (musician) (born 1981), Dutch musician
- John Christian of Brieg, Duke of Brzeg–Legnica–Wołów (1591–1639)
- John Christian, Count Palatine of Sulzbach (1700–1733)
- John T. Christian (1854–1925), Baptist preacher, author and educator
- John Wyrill Christian (1926–2001), British metallurgist
- John Lorenzo Christian (1895–1984), Chief Magistrate of Pitcairn Island
