= Golden Drum Award =

National award of Dominica

- Type: National Award
- Country: Commonwealth of Dominica
- Presented by: Dominica
- Status: Current
- Established: 1982; 44 years ago

The Golden Drum Award is the Commonwealth of Dominica's highest cultural award.

Instituted in 1982, the Golden Drum Award is issued annually to individuals, groups or institutions that have made outstanding contributions to the development of Dominica's art and culture spanning at least 20 years. Presented at the same ceremony are Special Recognition Awards for notable successes in a particular field of arts and culture.

== Notable recipients ==
- Pearle Christian
- Lennox Honychurch
- Ophelia Marie
