= Isle of Beauty =

National anthem of Dominica

- National anthem of Dominica
- Lyrics: Wilfred Oscar Morgan Pond, 1967
- Music: Lemuel McPherson Christian, 1967
- Adopted: 1978

Audio sample
- U.S. Navy Band instrumental version (one verse): file; help

"Isle of Beauty" is the popular title for the national anthem of Dominica (officially the Commonwealth of Dominica). It was adopted upon the island gaining statehood in 1967, and again with Dominica's independence in 1978. The lyrics are by Wilfred Oscar Morgan Pond (1912–1985), and the music was composed by Lemuel McPherson Christian OBE (1917–2000).

The words convey pride in the natural resources of the island and the strength and health of its people, with the call for unity in its closing line – "All for Each and Each for All" – representing a collective effort towards national development.

The anthem was listed by The Guardian as one of the 10 best national anthems of countries competing at the 2008 Beijing Olympics.

== Lyrics ==
I
Isle of beauty, isle of splendour,
Isle to all so sweet and fair,
All must surely gaze in wonder
At thy gifts so rich and rare.
Rivers, valleys, hills and mountains,
All these gifts we do extol.
Healthy land, so like all fountains,
Giving cheer that warms the soul.

II
Dominica, God hath blest thee
With a clime benign and bright,
Pastures green and flowers of beauty
Filling all with pure delight,
And a people strong and healthy,
Full of godly reverent fear.
May we ever seek to praise Thee
For these gifts so rich and rare.

III
Come ye forward, sons and daughters
Of this gem beyond compare.
Strive for honour, sons and daughters,
Do the right, be firm, be fair.
Toil with hearts and hands and voices.
We must prosper! Sound the call,
In which ev'ryone rejoices,
"All for Each and Each for All".
