= Keith Christian =

Australian zoologist

Dr. Keith Christian is Professor of Zoology at Charles Darwin University where he teaches in the School of Environmental & Life Sciences.

He is a specialist in the physiology of amphibians and reptiles.
