= Frederick Christian =

Frederick Christian may refer to:

- Frederick Christian (cricketer) (1877–1941), English cricketer
- Frederick Christian, Count of Schaumburg-Lippe (1655–1728)
- Frederick Christian, Elector of Saxony (1722–1763)
- Frederick Christian, Margrave of Brandenburg-Bayreuth (1708–1769)
- Frederick Christian I, Duke of Schleswig-Holstein-Sonderburg-Augustenburg (1721–1794)
- Frederick Christian II, Duke of Schleswig-Holstein-Sonderburg-Augustenburg (1765–1814)
- Frederick Martin Christian (1883–1971), politician from Pitcairn
