= William Christian =

William Christian may refer to:

- Bill Christian (born 1938), American Olympic ice hockey player
- William Christian (1608–1663), also known as Illiam Dhone, Manx political leader
- William Christian (Virginia politician) (1743–1786), military officer, planter and politician
- William Christian (political scientist) (born 1945), Canadian political scientist
- William A. Christian (born 1944), American religious historian
- William Christian (actor) (born 1955), American television actor
