= Pwi pwi =

Miniature raft, native to Dominica

A Pwi pwi is a type of miniature raft, native to Dominica. They were carved out of tree trunks, usually Bois Canon (Cecropia peltata) by the Kalinago people. They are very simple in design, and are used for inshore fishing for fish, lobster, shellfish and conch.
