= 2004 Pitcairnese general election =

Elections in the Pitcairn Islands

General elections were held in the Pitcairn Islands on 15 December 2004. Voters elected a mayor, a council chairman, and four councillors to sit on the island council.

== Results ==
=== Mayor ===
For the mayoralty, Jay Warren defeated Mike Warren and the incumbent Brenda Christian, who had held the office since 8 November in an interim capacity following Governor Richard Fell's dismissal of her brother, Steve Christian, on 29 October following his five rape convictions.

=== Council chairman ===
The chairmanship of the council was won by Mike Warren, who defeated Brenda Christian, Jay Warren and Pawl Warren.

=== Island council ===
The four ordinary councillors to be elected were Meralda Warren, Olive Christian, Carol Warren and Lea Brown. Unsuccessful candidates included Brenda Christian, Jay Warren, Mike Warren, Pawl Warren, Tom Christian, Charlene Warren, Darralyn Griffith, Vaine Peu, Daphe Warren and Nola Warren.

== Reaction ==
Speaking from his British High Commission office in Wellington, New Zealand, Deputy Governor Matthew Forbes told Radio New Zealand that he welcomed Jay Warren's election as mayor. "We appointed Jay as chairman of the (island's) internal committee in the period after the trials and before this election," Forbes said. "He's very experienced and I'm sure he'll make a very good mayor."
