= Scouting and Guiding in the Pitcairn Islands =

Scouting and Guiding in the Pitcairn Islands is served by the Pitcairn Island Sea Scouts, an initiative of the local police officer who was installed by the British government for the first time following the discovery of child abuse in 2004.

Scouting was introduced to Pitcairn Island in 2011 by Sergeant Russell Torr of the Pitcairn Island Police Force. The British government has an agreement with the government of New Zealand to provide police officers to Pitcairn, which is an overseas territory of the United Kingdom. The officer is supplied by New Zealand for a year-long term and runs the Sea Scout group as part of their duties.

In 2011, there were 7 members, both male and female, from an island population of approximately 50, and in 2022, there were three, all girls.

Scouting on the island includes a unique blend of traditional Scouting teaching, activities such as obstacle courses inspired by New Zealand police training, and learning about island life. The Scouts learn valuable skills, as a 2014 economic review estimated that by 2045, there will not be enough young people to do the hard manual work like rowing boats out to the supply ship that comes every quarter. Pitcairn Island does not have an airport, airstrip or seaport; the islanders rely on longboats to ferry people and goods between visiting ships and shore through Bounty Bay.

The Sea Scouts also participate in educational activities with the Pitcairn Marine Protection Area to increase community awareness and appreciation of the area, and take a role in celebrations such as Remembrance Day and Anzac Day on the island.
