= Meralda Warren =

Nurse, poet and artist (born 1959)

- Born: 28 June 1959 (age 67); Pitcairn Island
- Writing career
- Language: Pitkern, English
- Notable work: Mi Bas Side Orn Pitcairn ('My Favourite Place on Pitcairn')

Meralda Elva Junior Warren (born 28 June 1959) is an artist and poet of the Pitcairn Islands, a remote British Overseas Territory in the South Pacific. She works in both English and Pitkern, the island's distinctive creole language. Her book, Mi Bas Side Orn Pitcairn, written with the island's six children, is the first to be written and published in both English and Pitkern. As an artist, she works with tapa cloth, a Polynesian tradition. She has also published a cookbook featuring Pitcairn Island cuisine.

Warren has also served as the island's nurse, its only police officer, a ham radio operator, and as a member of the territory's governing council, among many other roles.

== Biography ==
Warren was born on Pitcairn Island on 28 June 1959, the second child of Jacob Ralph "Chippie" Warren (1920–2007) and Mavis Mary Brown (born 1936). Warren is the sister of Jay Warren (born 1950) who served as the third mayor of the Pitcairn Islands (2004–2007), and previously as the colony's 29th magistrate (1991–1997). She is a first cousin of Mike Warren (born 1964), the colony's fourth mayor (2007–2014). She is the descendant of mutineers from the famed Mutiny on the Bounty (1789) and of the Tahitian men and women who journeyed with the mutineers in settling the island in 1790.

=== Artist, poet, author and many other jobs ===
Warren is a poet, and the author of two books, including Mi Bas Side Orn Pitcairn ('My Favourite Place on Pitcairn'), written with children on Pitcairn Island. It is the first book written and published in Pitkern and English.

Her works include a cookbook, Taste of Pitcairn featuring the cuisine of the Pitcairn Islands, and poetry in both Pitkern and English.

In 2007, Warren revived Pitcairn's tradition of art created on tapa cloth, a woven bark cloth common in Polynesian culture. Her works have been displayed in museums and galleries in Tahiti, Norfolk Island, and New Zealand. In 2011, she was one of seven artists awarded a Commonwealth Connections International Arts Residency, which provided a grant of £8,000 that allowed her to work with other artists in New Zealand. She is the first recipient from the Pitcairn Islands.

Pitcairn has a small population. The island's 48 residents often serve in several capacities or jobs. Warren describes her many roles on her personal website:

Travelling with patients to New Zealand and Tahiti and taking up Nursing, Radio Operator for the shore to ship skeds from ZBP station and twice daily contact with Auckland international Radio telephone link, Working in our Co-op store, Council member for many years as well as being the Governors appointee member to council a few times, Becoming the first female Police & Immigration Officer for a few years. Lands Commission president, Lands court member, Bee keeper since 1978. ASL operator for seismic Vault, Installing wireless networking throughout Adamstown, Duncan cleaner, Contract Lawnmowing jobs, and many misc jobs inc Tourism and Entertainment. PHEWWwww. it became apparent to me that what I enjoy most is my art. (T)his is getting pushed aside whilst I am working these time consuming no pay or low paid positions which was making me very tired and yes. ... Bitchy [sic]

Beginning in 1996, Warren served as the island's only police officer. However, since no one had been arrested on the island since the 1950s, her duties involved issuing driving licences and stamping visitors' passports. Warren had no qualifications or formal training to be a police officer, and was given the job because everyone on the island had a "job". The island's jail was described as "the size of a garden shed and riddled with termites", and its cells had been used to store building materials and lifejackets. When the island came into the international spotlight due to a sexual abuse scandal, a law enforcement professional sent to the island criticized their practices, stating "It was glaringly obvious ... that their standard of policing was not really adequate."

Warren was elected on 15 December 2004 to the Island Council. As a radio operator, she broadcasts under the call sign VP6MW.

=== Pitcairn's sexual abuse trial ===
Warren was an outspoken critic of accusations that the island's girls had been sexually abused when young, and the prosecution of a selected number of Pitcairn's male residents. She claimed that young girls on Pitcairn customarily became sexually active after age 12, a practice of underage sex that had been accepted as a Polynesian tradition since the settlement of the island in 1790. One resident, Olive Christian, said of her girlhood, "We all thought sex was like food on the table."

Many Pitcairn Island men blamed the British police for persuading the women involved to press charges. Some of the women agreed, and advocated a conspiracy theory that the trial was, in Warren's words, "a British plot to jail the [community's] able-bodied men and 'close' the island", and that the British officials "picked on all the viable young men, the ones who are the backbone of this place".

A majority of the island's residents denied or excused the allegations. During the trial, Warren circulated a poem titled "Is Seven a Lucky Number?" that criticized the British government and lawyers' attempts to impose British law against their island's traditions.

"There's never an age consent set in our Laws
Oh 16 is in the British clause
What book they choose
What next law will they ruse
Why must these Seven men be used"

As the case wore on, Warren reflected that "the bottom had fallen out of our world ... We lost our trust for each other." Her brother, Jay Warren, who was accused of "indecent assault", was the only defendant among the seven accused to be acquitted on 24 October 2004.

Warren was convicted of assault during a drunken disagreement with another resident when the two were angered by tensions over the sexual abuse matter. The case was prosecuted by a Crown prosecutor and tried by a New Zealand magistrate. Warren was fined NZ$60. The case cost the British government NZ$40,000 to prosecute.

== Works ==
- 1986: A Taste of Pitcairn: The First Pitcairn Island Cookbook
- 2008: Mi Bas Side Orn Pitcairn ('My Favourite Place on Pitcairn') (compiler)
- 2010: A Taste of Pitcairn: The First Pitcairn Island Cookbook (updated edition)

== See also ==
- Politics of the Pitcairn Islands
- List of rulers of the Pitcairn Islands
