= Pervis Ferris Young =

Pitcairn Island politician (1928–2003)

Pervis Ferris Young (24 March 1928 – 29 May 2003) was magistrate of the British Overseas Territory of Pitcairn Island from 1967 until 1975. Young was born on Pitcairn Island and died in 2003 at Auckland. He was succeeded by his brother-in-law Ivan Christian, and was uncle to future mayors Steve Christian and Brenda Christian.
