= 1971 Pitcairnese general election =

General elections were held in the Pitcairn Islands on 26 December 1971 to elect members of the Island Council. Of the island's 91 residents, 61 were registered to vote. Voting was compulsory, with a $1 fine for failing to cast a ballot.

== Results ==
Elected members included Gifford Christian and Ivan Christian.
