= 2008 Pitcairnese general election =

Elections in the Pitcairn Islands

General elections were held in the Pitcairn Islands on 8 December 2008.

== Electoral system ==
The four elected members of the Island Council were elected by single transferable vote for two year terms. In addition, the Council had six other members; the Mayor and the Deputy Mayor, both of whom were elected separately. The four elected members and the Deputy Mayor nominated a further member, whilst two were appointed by the Governor and one seat was reserved for a Commissioner liaising between the Governor and the Council.

== Results ==
Jay Warren was elected Deputy Mayor, whilst Turi Griffiths, Brenda Christian, Dave Brown and Jacqui Christian were elected to the Island Council.
