= Lost Paradise (Marks book) =

2009 book by Kathy Marks

Lost Paradise: From Mutiny on the Bounty to a Modern-Day Legacy of Sexual Mayhem, the Dark Secrets of Pitcairn Island Revealed is a 2009 non-fiction book by Kathy Marks about the Pitcairn sexual assault trial of 2004. In 2004 Marks was one of only 6 journalists allowed to report on the trials from Pitcairn Islands, reporting for both The Independent and The New Zealand Herald. She lived in the small community for the six-week duration of the trials where she was often in contact with the men standing trial.

== Accusations and trial ==
In 1999 a teenage girl whom Marks referred to as Belinda came forward about being raped by a visitor to the island named Randy Quinn. Though Pitcairn was mostly self-policed, Gail Cox, a police officer from Kent was visiting to deliver police training to the island's one designated police officer and was able to take a statement from Belinda. While Belinda's attack by Randy Quinn ended with his sentence being remitted Belinda admitted to Cox that she had been raped by other men on the island. As a result of this statement police forces started Operation Unique, interviewing women who had lived on the island at any point during the previous twenty years. 100% of the women interviewed said they had been raped and investigators were disturbed to learn that the male relatives of the rape victims were often in fact rapists themselves who preyed on other young islander girls.

When investigators came to the island to interview the men accused of rape they readily admitted to having sex with girls as young as twelve while claiming it was consensual, though the girls themselves said that the rapes began when they were much, much younger.
