= Politics of the Pitcairn Islands =

The Pitcairn Islands are a British Overseas Territory in the South Pacific Ocean, with a population of about 35. The politics of the islands takes place in a framework of a parliamentary representative democratic dependency, whereby the Mayor is the head of government. The territory's constitution is the Local Government Ordinance of 1964. In terms of population, the Pitcairn Islands is the smallest democracy in the world.

The government's administrative offices are in Auckland, New Zealand.

== Executive branch ==
Main office-holders
| Office | Name | Party | Since |
|---|---|---|---|
| King | Charles III | (None) | 8 September 2022 |
| Governor (non-res.) | Louise Cantillon | (None) | 18 August 2026 |
| Administrator | Rachael Midlen | (None) | July 2025 |
| Mayor | Shawn Christian | (None) | 1 January 2026 |

The King is represented by the Governor of the Pitcairn Islands, who is the British High Commissioner to New Zealand. A non-resident Commissioner, appointed by the Governor, serves as the Governor's Representative to the territory. The Commissioner is responsible for the day-to-day administration of the island as well as for its economic regeneration, and also serves as the liaison between the Governor and the Island Council. As both the Governor and the Commissioner do not live on the island, its daily affairs have since 1999 been taken care of by the mayor of Pitcairn. The Island Magistrate is appointed by the Governor. The Chairman of the Internal Committee is an elected official.

Until 30 October 2004, the mayor was Steve Christian; after his rape conviction on 24 October 2004, Christian was dismissed (after refusing to resign). His sister Brenda Christian was selected by the Island Council to be mayor for November and December 2004, until an election was held. Jay Warren was elected on 15 December 2004. The island Mayor is elected by popular vote for a three-year term. The first elected female mayor was Charlene Warren-Peu in 2020.

=== Attorney General of the Pitcairn Islands ===
The Attorney General of the Pitcairn Islands is appointed under Section 35 of the Pitcairn Islands Constitution and serves as the principal legal adviser to the government of Pitcairn for a set term. Initially, the Attorney General was referred to as the Legal Adviser. The Attorney General's powers and responsibilities include handling criminal matters, drafting Pitcairn ordinances, and revising and publishing any laws that pertain to the country.

Attorney General – Pitcairn Islands (Complete Table)
| Name | Term |
|---|---|
| Donald A. McLoughlin | c. 1958–1979 |
| Paul Treadwell | c. 1979–2007 |
| Paul Rishworth | c. 2007–2015 |
| Simon Mount | c. 2015–2025 |
| Danielle Kelly | c. 2025– |

== Legislative branch ==
The Pitcairn Islands have a unicameral Island Council (10 seats: the Mayor and the Chairman of the Island Council both hold membership ex officio; 4 elected by popular vote; 1 co-opted by the Chairman and the 4 other elected members; 2 appointed by the Governor including the Island Secretary (ex officio); the tenth seat is reserved for a Commissioner (non-resident) who liaises between the Council and the Governor. Except for the Mayor, who has a three-year term, and the Island Secretary, whose term is indefinite, members serve one-year terms.

Elections are held every two years for councillors and deputy mayor and every three years for the mayor. Before a change in the Constitution, elections were held every year on 24 December. There are no political parties on the islands.

== Judicial branch ==
- Island Court: the island magistrate, appointed by the Governor for a three-year term, usually presides over the court; however there have been several non-resident magistrates over the last five years. These magistrates were appointed as part of the judicial structure set up for the purposes of the Pitcairn sexual assault trials.
- Supreme Court: while Pitcairn law has made provision for a Supreme Court for a number of years, no judges were appointed to it and it never sat. However, the Court was activated as part of the constitutional and judicial arrangements put in place for the trial referred to above.
- Court of Appeal: unlike the Supreme Court, the Court of Appeal is a recent creation. It was established by an Order in Council in 2000 in preparation for the above trial. Allowance has also been made for both the Supreme Court and the Court of Appeal to sit either in the islands or at such other country or place as may be permitted by any law. In practice, the Supreme Court has sat both on Pitcairn itself and in Auckland, New Zealand, while the Court of Appeal has only sat in New Zealand.
- Privy Council: the Privy Council is the final court of appeal for Pitcairn. While some appellate jurisdiction may previously have existed (through common law), appeals to the Privy Council were formally permitted by an Order in Council issued in 2000.

The members of the Pitcairn judiciary are all New Zealanders – as are almost all of the lawyers admitted to the Pitcairn Bar – and are all either current or former members of the judiciary or legal profession (in the case of the magistrates) in that country.

Currently, the members of the judiciary are:

- Chief Justice: Charles Blackie.
- President of the Court of Appeal: John Henry.
- Judges of the Court of Appeal: Sir Ian Barker, Paul Neazor.
- Judges of the Supreme Court: Jane Lovell-Smith, Russell Johnson.

Additionally, several magistrates have been appointed from amongst the ranks of the senior members of the legal profession in New Zealand. The Pitcairn Public Prosecutor – Simon Moore (also the Crown Solicitor at Auckland) and Public Defender – Paul Dacre – were also appointed.

According to a 2012 report, there are no lawyers in the Pitcairn Islands. There has been a Public Defender serving the islands since 2003.

== See also ==
- Pacific Community (SPC)
