= 2010 Pitcairnese mayoral election =

Elections in the Pitcairn Islands

Mayoral elections were held in the Pitcairn Islands in December 2010. Incumbent Mike Warren was re-elected.

== Campaign ==
The election was marked by negative campaigning, with some campaigning taking place after the legal deadline.

== Results ==
Candidate	Votes	%
Mike Warren	15	32.61
Three other candidates	31	67.39
Total	46	100.00
Source: Pitcairn News

== Aftermath ==
Following the election, a petition was circulated with a view to changing the electoral law retrospectively. Although it was signed by almost 30 people, including some Councillors, several signatures were later withdrawn and the petition was rejected by the Governor.
