= Mr Turpen =

Galapagos tortoise

Mr Turpen is a male Galapagos tortoise that lives in the Pitcairn Islands. These animals were known as "turpins"; for example, Charles Darwin wrote, "Met an immense Turpin; took little notice of me."

== History ==
Mr Turpen was brought to the Pitcairn Islands by Irving Johnson on board his ship Yankee in 1937. He was unloaded by longboat, at Bounty Bay. Mr Turpen is the only survivor of the five Galapagos tortoises brought to the Pitcairn Islands between 1937 and 1951. An ordinance was passed to protect Mr Turpen, by the Island Council; anyone harming him is liable to 60 days imprisonment.

On 14 January 2000 the Pitcairn Islands issued a set of postage stamps celebrating Mr Turpen and the protection ordinance.
