= Pitcairn Supreme Court =

Supreme court of the British Overseas Territory of Pitcairn Islands

- The coat of arms of the Pitcairn Islands
- Jurisdiction: Pitcairn Islands
- Location: Pitcairn Islands, New Zealand or the United Kingdom
- Composition method: Appointed by the Governor of the Pitcairn Islands on the instructions of His Majesty The King
- Authorised by: Pitcairn Constitution Order 2010
- Appeals to: Pitcairn Court of Appeal or the Privy Council

Chief Justice of the Pitcairn Islands
- Currently: Charles Blackie VRD
- Since: 2004

The Pitcairn Supreme Court is the supreme court of the Pitcairn Islands, a British Overseas Territory. It is a superior court of record. Provisions for a supreme court were set out in amendments to the Old Constitution Order in the 1990s. The court first sat for the Pitcairn sexual assault trial of 2004, and its powers were further elaborated on in the Constitution Order 2010.

There are currently three judges appointed to the court, including Chief Justice Charles Blackie, all of whom are judges in New Zealand. An agreement between the British and New Zealand governments was signed at Wellington on 11 October 2002 which provided for Pitcairn court cases to be heard in New Zealand. This was later reinforced by legislation passed in New Zealand and the Pitcairn Islands, being the Pitcairn Trials Act 2002 and the Judicature Amendment Ordinance respectively. Hearings of the court may also be held in the United Kingdom.

== Judges ==
Judges are appointed by the Governor of the Pitcairn Islands under instruction from King Charles III. There must be, at all times, one Chief Justice and up to four other judges or acting judges. The current judges are:

Pitcairn Islands
| Name | Portrait | Date Appointed | Date Retired | Other Judicial Offices | Notes | Incumbent Governor | Monarch |
|---|---|---|---|---|---|---|---|
| Charles Blackie Chief Justice (until 2022) | | 2004 | 2022 | District Court of New Zealand | | Iona Thomas (2022–present) | Elizabeth II (1952–2022) |
| Jane Lovell-Smith | | 2004 | ? | District Court of New Zealand | | Iona Thomas (2022–present) | Elizabeth II (1952–2022) |
| Russell Johnson (judge) | | 2004 | 2011 | District Court of New Zealand | | Iona Thomas (2022–present) | Elizabeth II (1952–2022) |
| Paul Heath Chief Justice (since 2022) | | 2022 | Current | Court of Appeal of Tonga | | Iona Thomas (2022–present) | Charles III (2022–present) |

== Cases ==
=== Sexual assault trial ===
The court first sat to try the Pitcairn sexual assault trial of 2004. The tribunal's first decision was whether to accept the defence claim that the Pitcairn Islands were not in fact legally British territory and had not been such since at least the time that the original settlers, the mutineers of the Bounty, burned the vessel in a symbolic (and, from the defence viewpoint, actual) rejection of further British sovereignty and rule. The Supreme Court ruled that the Pitcairns were in fact British territory and were generally internationally recognised to be such and that the trial was thus legal.

The Court later (October 23) found the defendants to be guilty of the sexual offences alleged against them, which created turmoil as the defendants included the islands' mayor, Steve Christian, direct descendant of leading Bounty mutineer Fletcher Christian. Steve Christian's sister was then installed as mayor until a new election could be held for a new island government.

=== Child pornography trial ===
In 2010, then-mayor of the islands Mike Warren was charged with possession of child pornography. In 2016 he was found guilty of downloading more than 1000 images and videos of child sexual abuse. Warren began collecting child pornography after the 2004 Pitcairn child sex abuse trial, where six islanders were found guilty of various sexual crimes against children.
