= Law enforcement in the Pitcairn Islands =

Pitcairn Islands Police

Jurisdictional structure
- Operations jurisdiction: Pitcairn, Henderson, Ducie and Oeno Islands, British Overseas Territories
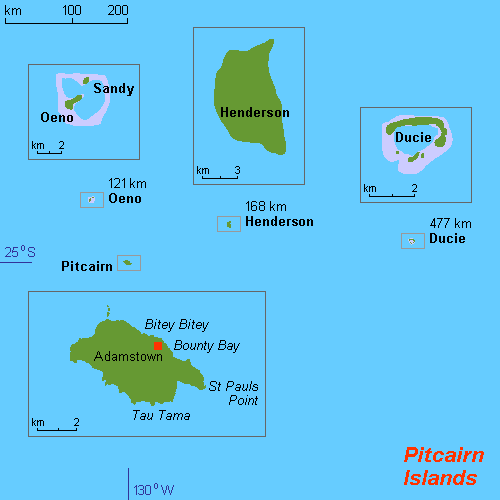
- Map of Pitcairn Islands Police's jurisdiction
- Area: 47 km^{2}
- Population: 56 (2013)

Operational structure
- Headquarters: Adamstown
- Constables: 2

Facilities
- Stations: 1
- Quadbikes: 1

The Pitcairn Islands Police is the police force responsible for the Pitcairn Islands, a British overseas territory. With just two Constables, it is the smallest British police force. In the aftermath of child sexual abuse revelations, the force briefly numbered five constables, including Ministry of Defence Police officers on temporary secondment. Historically, and until 2000, a Pitcairn Island resident was appointed as the island group's sole police officer, and also acted as immigration and customs officer. From 2000 to 2015, the combined police, immigration, and customs role was held by a series of foreign professionals on short-term secondment. In 2015, the Pitcairn Government website announced that both previous systems would be employed alongside each other, with one local island police officer and one foreign police officer on secondment, working together.

The resident population of the islands has not exceeded 60 in recent years. There is a single police station on the main island. The legal status of officers in the Pitcairn Islands Police is established by section 79 of the Pitcairn Justice Ordinance 2000, which also defines their duties.

== Child sex charges ==
A British policewoman, Gail Cox from Kent, was stationed on the island in 1999 for a short-duty secondment, but during her stay she discovered evidence of historic child sex offences. Her report led to historic sex charges, one dating back to 1972, against a number of Pitcairn Islands men, and also to a change in the way the islands of Pitcairn, Henderson, Ducie, and Oeno are policed.

== Ministry of Defence Police presence ==
From the start of the investigation into child sexual abuse on Pitcairn (2000), to the conclusion of the appeals process following the Pitcairn sexual assault trial of 2004 (2006), policing was provided by the British Ministry of Defence Police, with at least two officers stationed at any time, on four-month rotation. A new prison and police station was specially constructed on Pitcairn Island, the only one of the four islands in the Pitcairn group to be inhabited.

== Policing since the investigation ==
In late 2006, when the appeals process following the sex offence trials was concluded, it was announced that a retired Scottish police sergeant, Malcolm Gilbert from the Orkney Islands, had been recruited on a 12-month contract to police the island from early 2007.

When Sergeant Gilbert's tour of duty ended, the British government entered into an agreement with the government of New Zealand for the island to have a different New Zealand police officer stationed annually as the resident Pitcairn Police constable. Twenty New Zealand police officers responded to the British government's advertisement early in 2008, and Sergeant Mike Cleeton was appointed, taking up his appointment in the early summer of 2008. He reported that he found crime rates to be very low. New Zealand police officers have continued to be posted on one-year secondments since that time.

== Prison officers ==
Owing to the relatively high number of prisoners held in the Pitcairn Island prison (five prisoners, representing 10.5% of the permanent resident population) following the 2004 child sex convictions, a number of New Zealand Department of Corrections officers were stationed on Pitcairn Island, under contract to the British government. This provision is now being scaled back, as almost all prisoners have reached the end of their sentences, or been moved from the prison to house arrest. However, the governor has the right to establish any building as a prison, and under the terms of the Pitcairn Prisons Ordinance 2001 (section 5, subsection 2) all police officers on the island are also, ex officio, prison officers.

== Customs and immigration ==
The police officer on Pitcairn is also a customs officer and an immigration officer, responsible for passport control, and for receiving visa fees from incoming visitors to the island. Under Pitcairn Law the police officer is responsible to the (appointed) Governor for policing, but to the (elected) Mayor in matters of immigration. The Mayor is ex officio the Chief Immigration Officer of Pitcairn.

== See also ==
- Brenda Christian
