= Kathy Marks =

British journalist

Kathy Marks is a British journalist based in Sydney. She is best known for her work on The Independent, for which she is the Asia Pacific correspondent.

== Early life and education ==
Kathy Marks grew up in Manchester, England, and studied languages.

== Career ==
A journalist since 1984, Marks' first job was at the Reuters news agency. She has also worked for The Daily Telegraph. She has covered the 1999 East Timorese crisis, the 2002 Bali nightclub bombings, the insurgency in Aceh (a civil war in Indonesia), the Indian Ocean tsunami in 2004, and the 2006 Yogyakarta earthquake.

Marks became The Independent's Asia-Pacific correspondent based in Sydney, Australia, in 1999. As of February 2025 Marks remains in the position.

Marks covered the Pitcairn sexual assault trial of 2004 on and off that Pacific island and has written a book on the subject, Lost Paradise.

== Awards ==
In 2013, Marks won a Walkley Award in the Indigenous Affairs category for her essay "Channelling Mannalargenna" in The Griffith Review.

== Bibliography ==
- Lost Paradise: From Mutiny on the Bounty to a Modern-Day Legacy of Sexual Mayhem, the Dark Secrets of Pitcairn Island Revealed (2009)
- Faces of Right Wing Extremism (2006)
