= .pn =

Internet country code top-level domain

- Introduced: 10 July 1997
- TLD type: Country code top-level domain
- Status: Active
- Registry: Pitcairn Island Administration
- Sponsor: Pitcairn Island Administration
- Intended use: Entities connected with Pitcairn Islands
- Actual use: Gets some use on the Pitcairn Islands; some use elsewhere as URL shortener or domain hack
- Registration restrictions: None
- Structure: Registrations are made directly at the second level; there are also some third-level registrations, such as under second-level categories like .gov.pn and personal sites under firstname.lastname.pn (similar to .name)
- Documents: .pn policies Archived
- Dispute policies: UDRP
- Registry website: Registry

.pn is the Internet country code top-level domain (ccTLD) for the Pitcairn Islands.

== Use ==
An official .pn domain costs $100 per year from the registry. There are relatively few sites using these domains, but examples include ESPN, Experian, C-SPAN, happn, and Groupon, each of whom use the domain for URL shortening services.

Subdomains under various two-letter .pn domains were offered as free redirections and as domain names by numerous providers. In August 2017, Free EU Hosting, one such provider, announced that due to reputation fears they will be discontinuing their popular eu.pn and me.pn subdomains and that they will eventually stop working, offering existing customers alternative subdomains.

The .pn domain is also used as part of a Lionsgate marketing campaign promoting the Hunger Games film series, presenting it as the "official" country code of the fictional nation of Panem, with domains for the Capitol and the rebellion.

== Management ==
ICANN originally delegated the management of the domain to islander Tom Christian. In 2000, the government of Pitcairn Island wrote a letter to the Internet Assigned Numbers Authority stating that Christian did not "adequately serve the interests of the country and community of Pitcairn Island" and requesting reassignment of the delegation of the top-level domain to the office of the governor of Pitcairn Island. The dispute was resolved when ICANN ruled that the domain would be re-delegated to the Pitcairn Island Council.

== Structure ==
The registrations are taken directly at the second level, and at third level under a number of reserved second level domains.

.pn second level domain names
| Top level domain name | Intended purpose |
|---|---|
| .co.pn | Commercial entities |
| .net.pn | Network-related entities |
| .org.pn | Non-commercial organisations |
| .edu.pn | Educational institutions |
| .gov.pn | Governmental entities |
