= Jay Warren =

Pitcairn Islands politician (born 1956)

2nd Mayor of Pitcairn Islands
- In office 1 January 2005 – 31 December 2007
- Preceded by: Brenda Christian (acting)
- Succeeded by: Mike Warren

29th Magistrate of the Pitcairn Islands
- In office 1 January 1991 – 7 December 1999
- Preceded by: Brian Young
- Succeeded by: Steve Christian as Mayor

Personal details
- Born: Jay Calvin Warren; 29 July 1956 (age 70) Pitcairn Island
- Party: Independent
- Spouse: Carol Christian (m. 1976)
- Children: Darylynn; Charlene

Jay Calvin Warren (born 29 July 1956) is a political figure from the Pacific territory of the Pitcairn Islands.

== Political roles ==
Jay Warren was elected mayor of the last remaining British dependency in Oceania in the general election held on 15 December 2004, defeating Brenda Christian, who had held the mayoralty in an interim capacity following the dismissal from the post of her brother, Steve Christian, by the British authorities on 30 October 2004, following his rape convictions. Warren was expected to take up his duties sometime around Christmas, when he was to return from Tahiti, where his daughter Darylynn was hospitalized and recovering from a longboat accident in which her arm was nearly severed. Besides Darylynn, he has another child, Charlene.

Jay Warren was no stranger to the post to which he was elected. From 1 January 1991 to 31 December 1999, he served in an almost identical capacity as Magistrate, as the chief elected official was known prior to a constitutional revision in 1999. Previously, after a brief stint as a member of the Island Council in 1982, he had assumed the second-most influential position on the island in 1985, as chairman of the Internal Committee. He continued to hold this office up to his election to the office of magistrate in late 1990.

As magistrate throughout most of the 1990s, Warren had executive, legislative, and judicial authority, serving ex officio as chairman of the Island Council, which doubles as the dependency's legislature and court. Following the constitutional review and the replacement of the magistrate by a mayor in 1999, Steve Christian was elected to the new position. Warren remained politically active, however, and served two further terms (in 2000 and 2002) as chairman of the Internal Committee.

Warren's election to the mayoralty in 2004 was welcomed by British Deputy Governor Matthew Forbes. "We appointed Jay as chairman of the (island's) internal committee in the period after the trials and before this election," Forbes told Radio New Zealand from his office at the British High Commission (the equivalent of an embassy in Commonwealth countries) in Wellington. "He's very experienced and I'm sure he'll make a very good mayor."

He was succeeded by Mike Warren as mayor in December 2007.

== Charges and acquittal ==
In the 2004 Pitcairn Islands sexual assault trial Warren was charged with the indecent assault of a 12-year-old girl. He was acquitted on 24 October 2004, the only one of the seven defendants to be found not guilty. He is the brother of Meralda Warren, who has also held political office and is one of the most vocal defenders of the islanders' traditional acceptance and practice of sexual activity from puberty onwards. Meralda Warren was also elected to the council on 15 December 2004.

== See also ==
- Politics of the Pitcairn Islands
- List of rulers of the Pitcairn Islands
