= Chairman of the Island Council (Pitcairn) =

Position on the legislature of the Pitcairn Islands

The Chairman of the Island Council is a position on the Island Council, which is the legislature of the Pitcairn Islands. Although the position is directly elected, the holder only sits on the Council ex officio.
