= Brenda Christian =

Pitcairn Island politician

Acting Mayor of Pitcairn Islands
- In office 8 November 2004 – 15 December 2004
- Preceded by: Steve Christian
- Succeeded by: Jay Warren

Deputy Mayor of Pitcairn
- In office 31 December 2013 – 1 January 2016
- Preceded by: Simon Young
- Succeeded by: Charlene Warren-Peu

Personal details
- Born: February 25, 1953 (age 73) Pitcairn Island
- Party: Independent
- Spouse: Michael Randall (m.1972)
- Children: Michael; Kirsty; Andrew

Brenda Vera Amelia Lupton-Christian (born 25 February 1953) is a political figure from the Pacific territory of the Pitcairn Islands. When her brother Steve Christian was removed from the office of mayor following the 2004 Pitcairn child sexual abuse trial, she served as interim mayor of the islands.

== Biography ==
Christian was born and raised on Pitcairn and is the daughter of former island political leader Ivan Christian and his wife Verna Carlene "Dobrey" Young. She lived in the United Kingdom for a time, but returned to the island around 1999 and has served as the island's sole police officer. Except for 2003, she has been a member of the Island Council continuously since 2000.

She stood for election in her own right, but in the special election held on 15 December, she was defeated by Jay Warren, the former Magistrate (whose office was renamed Mayor in 1999 following a constitutional revision). Her stated goal as mayor of the Pitcairn Islands was to make the islands a more attractive destination for tourism.

In 2004 Brenda Christian served the territory as its first female Mayor from 8 November to 15 December 2004. She was appointed to the Mayoralty in an interim capacity by the Island Council, following her brother Steve Christian's dismissal by the colonial Governor, in the wake of his child rape convictions on 30 October 2004.

Christian served as deputy mayor from 2014 to 2015.

== See also ==
- Politics of the Pitcairn Islands
- Law enforcement in the Pitcairn Islands
