= Charles Blackie =

New Zealand judge and chief justice of the Pitcairn Supreme Court

His Honour Charles Blackie QSO VRD
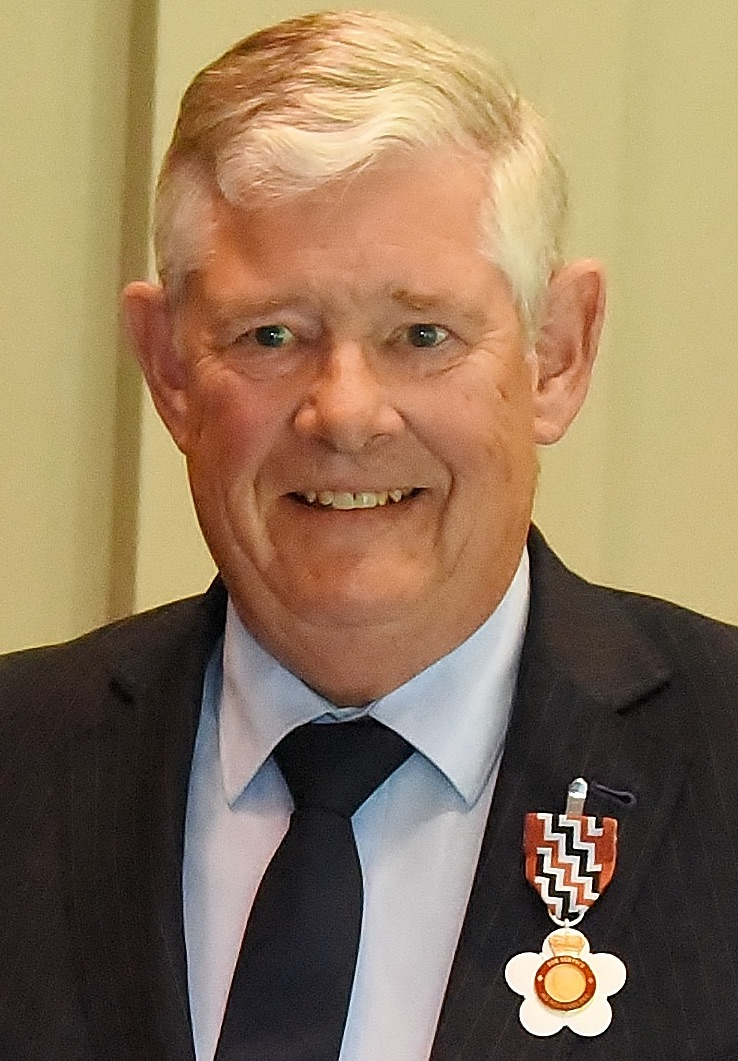
- Blackie in 2017

Chief Justice of the Pitcairn Supreme Court
- In office 2004–2022
- Appointed by: Elizabeth II
- Preceded by: New position
- Succeeded by: Paul Heath

Personal details
- Born: Putāruru, New Zealand

Charles Stuart Blackie QSO VRD is a New Zealand judge who was the Chief Justice of the Pitcairn Supreme Court and is also a judge of the District Courts of New Zealand. He is a former Commander in the Royal New Zealand Naval Volunteer Reserve.

Blackie was born and grew up in Putāruru and went to Auckland to study law at the age of 18.

Blackie is a founding member of the Armed Forces Law Association of New Zealand and is also currently the Chief Justice of the Pitcairn Supreme Court, having been appointed to that role in 2004. He oversaw the Pitcairn sexual assault trial of 2004, which was widely covered by foreign media. Blackie was also appointed to the District Courts of New Zealand on 18 December 1998, and is a Senior District Court Judge sitting in the Manukau District Court, Auckland.

In his capacity as Chief Justice of the Pitcairn Supreme Court, Blackie attended the opening of the Supreme Court of the United Kingdom on 16 October 2009.

In the 2017 New Year Honours, Blackie was appointed a Companion of the Queen's Service Order, for services to the judiciary and the community.
