= Ivan Christian =

Pitcairn Islands politician (1919–1991)

Ivan Roa Christian (31 May 1919 – 1991) was a politician from Pitcairn. He was the Chief Magistrate of Pitcairn Island from 1976 to 1984. As his surname suggests, he is descended from the original mutineers who settled the island, led by Fletcher Christian. He is related to a number of other island leaders, including his father Richard Edgar Christian, his uncle Charles Richard Parkin Christian and his great-grandfather Thursday October Christian II. Through his marriage to Verna Young, he is the father of Steve Christian and Brenda Christian.

== Ancestry ==
Ancestors of Ivan Christian

16. Thursday October Christian
8. Thursday October Christian II
17. Teraura
4. Francis Hickson Christian
18. William Young
9. Mary Young
19. Elizabeth Mills
2. Richard Edgar Christian
20. Edward Young II
10. Moses Young
21. Polly Christian
5. Eunice Jane Lawrence Young
22. Daniel McCoy (=22)
11. Albina McCoy
23. Sarah Quintal (=23)
1. Ivan Roa Christian
24. Daniel McCoy (=22)
12. Matthew McCoy
25. Sarah Quintal (=23)
6. James Russell McCoy
26. Charles Christian
13. Margaret Christian
27. Sully
3. Adelia Carrie Jordan McCoy
28. George Young
14. Simon Young
29. Hannah Adams
7. Eliza Coffin Palmer Young
30. John Buffett
15. Mary Buffett Christian
31. Mary Christian
