= Steve Christian =

Pitcairn Islands politician and child rapist (born 1951)

1st Mayor of Pitcairn Islands
- In office 7 December 1999 – 8 November 2004
- Preceded by: Jay Warren as Magistrate
- Succeeded by: Brenda Christian

Personal details
- Born: 26 June 1951 (age 74) Pitcairn Islands
- Party: Independent
- Spouse: Olive Jal Brown (m. 1972)
- Children: Trent; Randy; Shawn; Tania
- Parent(s): Ivan Christian; Verna Carlene Young
- Relatives: Brenda Christian (sister)

Steven Raymond Christian (born 26 June 1951) is a politician, convicted sex offender and child rapist from the Pitcairn Islands. He was mayor of the islands from 1999 until 2004, when he was removed from office after being found guilty in the Pitcairn child sexual abuse trial.

== Background and mayoralty ==
Christian is the son of Ivan Roa Christian and Verna Carlene "Dobrey" Young, a descendant of Ned Young. Ivan Roa Christian is the son of Richard Charles Edgar Christian and nephew of Charles Richard Parkin Christian, and is the grandson of Francis Hickson Christian. Steve Christian married Olive Jal Brown in 1972 and they have four children, including Shawn.

Public respect for Steve Christian's lineage gave him considerable influence long before he held political office, first as a member of the Island Council in 1976. He again served on the Council in 1982, and was briefly Chairman of the Internal Committee (considered the second-most influential political position on the island) in 1985. He was to hold this position again in 1991 and 1992, 1994 and 1995, and 1998 and 1999, when he was elected as the island's first mayor. The title was new but the office was not: the mayor had previously been known as the magistrate.

Christian was the Mayor of the Pitcairn Islands, a British dependency in the Pacific Ocean, from 7 December 1999 to 30 October 2004. He also acted as the island's supervising engineer, dentist, radiographer, and as coxswain of the longboat, which is described as Pitcairn's umbilical cord to the outside world. He was formally dismissed from office on 30 October 2004, following his rape conviction on 24 October.

== Sexual assault trial ==
In 2004, Steve Christian, along with six other men, was tried on charges of rape and child sexual abuse by the Pitcairn Supreme Court. Over the course of the trial, it was alleged that Christian repeatedly raped or assaulted a number of island women, including his children, over a period of several years, using the remoteness of the island and his position of power to coerce their silence. Christian denied all accusations of impropriety, but admitted having consensual sex with several of his children. Christian pleaded not guilty to all charges of rape and indecent assault, but on 24 October 2004, he was convicted of committing five rapes between 1964 and 1975 for which he was sentenced for three years. He was acquitted of a sixth rape charge and of four indecent assault charges.

On 8 November 2004, Christian's sister Brenda, the island's sole police officer, was elected by the Island Council to succeed him in an interim capacity, pending elections scheduled for 15 December, when Jay Warren, the acquitted former magistrate, was elected mayor.

== Later life ==
Christian served as one of the two assessors during the trial of Mike Warren for child pornography charges. When Warren was found guilty in 2016, Christian reportedly reacted: "I know I did some bad things in the past but never anything like that sort of stuff."

== Ancestry ==
Ancestors of Steve Christian

8. Francis Hickson Christian
4. Richard Edgar Allen Christian
9. Eunice Jane Lawrence Young
2. Ivan Roa Christian
10. James Russell McCoy
5. Adelia Carrie Jordan McCoy
11. Eliza Coffin Palmer Young
1. Steven Raymond Christian
12. David Andrew Stanley Young
6. Andrew Clarence David Young
13. Catherine Edith Warren
3. Verna Carlene Deborah Young
14. James Sanford Warren
7. Catherine Almira Warren
15. Ellen Catherine Young
