= 2004 Pitcairn Islands sexual assault trial =

Trial of seven men living on Pitcairn Island

In 2004, seven men living on Pitcairn Island faced 55 charges relating to sexual offences against children and young adults. The accused represented one-third of the island's male population and included Steve Christian, the mayor. On 24 October, six out of seven defendants were found guilty on at least some of the charges. Another six men living abroad, including Shawn Christian, who later served as mayor of Pitcairn, were tried on 41 charges in a separate trial in Auckland, New Zealand, in 2005.

The trial was repeatedly punctuated by legal challenges from island residents, who denied the island's colonial status, and with it the United Kingdom's judicial authority. Defence lawyers for the seven accused men claimed that British sovereignty over the islands was unconstitutional: HMS Bounty mutineers, from whom almost all of the current island population is descended (together with Polynesians), had effectively renounced their British citizenship by committing a capital offence in the burning of the Bounty in 1790, they said. According to the Public Defender of the Pitcairn Islands Paul Dacre (who was appointed in 2003), islanders still celebrated this act annually on Bounty Day by burning an effigy of the Bounty in a symbolic rejection of British rule. The defence maintained that the UK never made a formal claim to Pitcairn, and never officially informed the islanders that British legislation, such as the Sexual Offences Act 1956, (Note: Although the Sexual Offences Act 2003 had come into force on 1 May, the allegations were in respect of conduct before then, meaning the earlier Act applied. See Ex post facto law.) was applicable to them.

In a judgment delivered on 18 April 2004, the Pitcairn Supreme Court (specially established for the purpose of the trial, consisting of New Zealand judges authorised by the British government) rejected the claim that Pitcairn was not British territory. This decision was upheld in August 2004 by the Pitcairn Court of Appeal, endorsing the claim of Deputy Governor Matthew Forbes that Pitcairn was British territory. A delay of the trial until the United Kingdom's Judicial Committee of the Privy Council (JCPC) decided on an additional appeal was rejected. The trial started on 30 September 2004. Verdicts were delivered on 24 October 2004, with six out of seven defendants convicted on at least some of the charges they were facing. Those found guilty were sentenced on 29 October 2004.

== Historical background ==
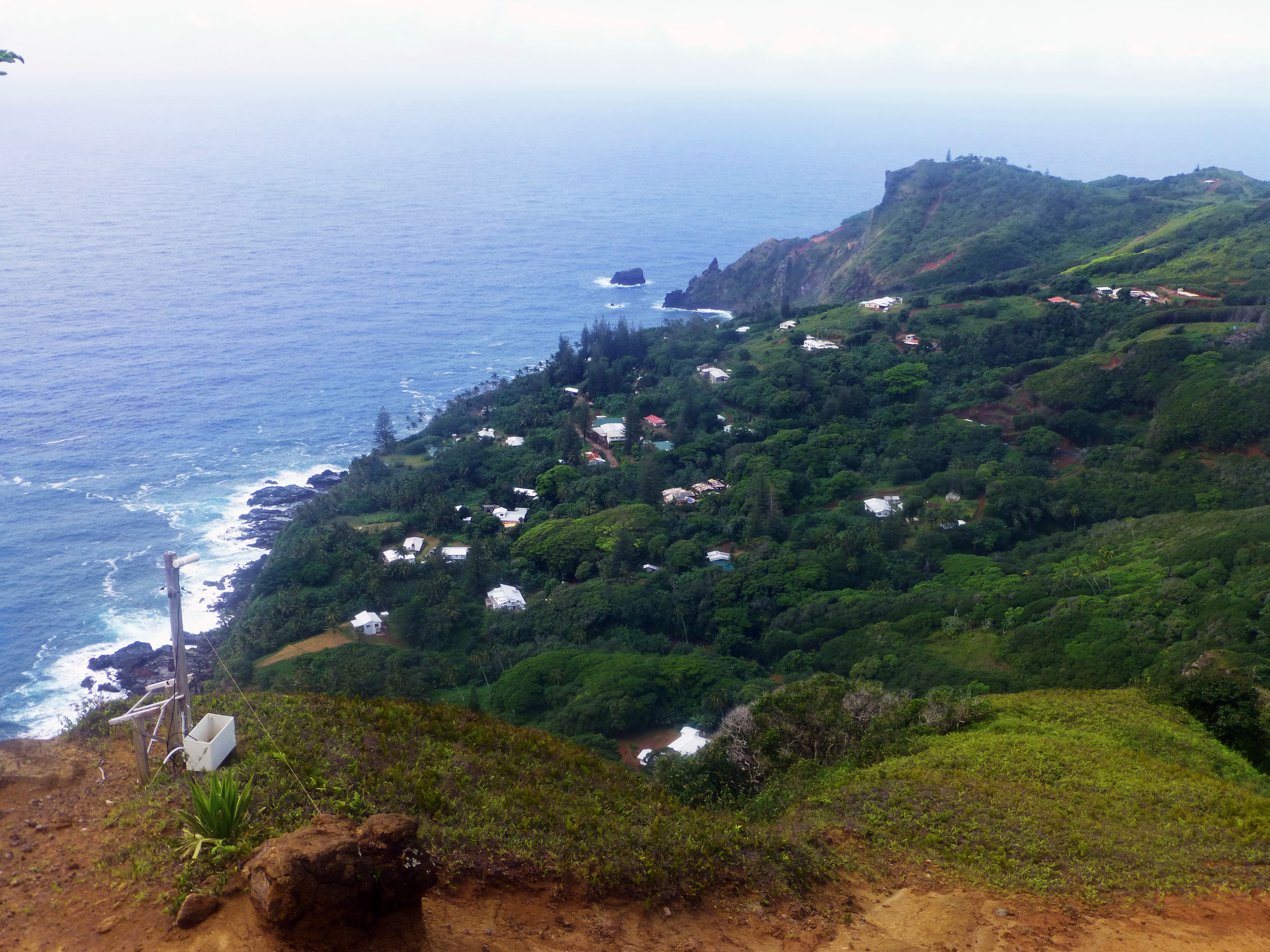
View of Adamstown, the only settlement in Pitcairn

The remoteness of Pitcairn (which lies about halfway between New Zealand and Peru) had shielded the tiny population (47 in 2004) from outside scrutiny. The islanders had for many decades tolerated what others classify as sexual promiscuity, even among the very young, claimed to be in line with traditional values of their Polynesian ancestors. This included a corresponding tacit acceptance of behaviour which in the UK would be considered child sexual abuse. Three cases of imprisonment for sex with underage girls were reported in the 1950s.

In 1999 Gail Cox, a police officer from Kent, England, serving a temporary assignment on Pitcairn, began uncovering allegations of sexual abuse. When a 15-year-old girl decided to press rape charges in 1999, criminal proceedings (code-named "Operation Unique") were set in motion. The charges include 21 counts of rape, 41 of indecent assault, and two of gross indecency with a child under 14. Over the following two years, police officers in Australia, New Zealand, and the United Kingdom interviewed every woman who had lived on Pitcairn in the past 20 years, as well as all of the accused men. Pitcairn Public Prosecutor Simon Moore (an Auckland Crown Solicitor who was the first lawyer appointed to the position by the British government for the purposes of the investigation) held the file.

Australian Seventh-day Adventist pastor Neville Tosen, who spent two years on Pitcairn around the turn of the millennium, said that on his arrival, he had been taken aback by the conduct of the children. But he had not immediately realised what was happening. "I noticed worrying signs such as inexplicable mood swings," he said. "It took me three months to realise they were being abused." Tosen tried to bring the matter before the Island Council (the legislative body which doubles as the island's court), but was rebuffed, and told "the age of consent has always been twelve and it doesn't hurt them."

A study of island records confirmed anecdotal evidence that most girls bore their first child between the ages of 12 and 15. "I think the girls were conditioned to accept that it was a man's world and once they turned 12, they were eligible," Tosen said. Mothers and grandmothers were resigned to the situation, telling him that their own childhood experience had been the same; they regarded it as just a part of life on Pitcairn. One grandmother wondered what all the fuss was about. Tosen was convinced, however, that the early sexual experience was very damaging to the girls. "They can't settle or form solid relationships. They did suffer, no doubt about it," he said emphatically.

Tosen opined that accounts of the Pitcairners' past transformation by Christianity, once popularised in missionary tracts, told only one side of the story. He noted that 13 of the original settlers were murdered, many in fights over women, before John Adams, the sole surviving mutineer, pacified them with the help of the Bible. "This is the island that the gospel changed, but the changes were only superficial," he said. "Deep down, they adhered to the mutineers' mentality. They must have known that their lifestyle was unacceptable, but it was too entrenched."

In 1999, a New Zealander visiting the island, Ricky Quinn, was sentenced by island magistrate Jay Warren to 100 days in prison for underage sex with a 15-year-old Pitcairn girl.

In 2002, the Queen-in-Council made the Pitcairn (Amendment) Order 2002, which paved the way for a trial based on Pitcairn law to be held in New Zealand in 2004. However, in 2004 the accused won a legal battle to be tried in Pitcairn. Three judges, several prosecution and defence lawyers, other court staff, and six journalists travelled from New Zealand to the island in late September for the seven-week trial. Their arrival doubled the number of people on the island during their stay. Witnesses living abroad gave evidence remotely by a video satellite link-up. The forty-five islanders were ordered to surrender their twenty or so guns, both in view of the heightened emotions and to avoid hunting accidents "because the island's population will swell by about 25 during the trial."

In 2004 the biographer Diana Souhami visited Pitcairn, attempting to travel incognito, but her cover was blown early in her stay. Before she was told to leave the island, she gathered enough material for her next book, Coconut Chaos.

As of April 2006, the cost of the trial amounted to NZ$14.1 million.

== Local reaction ==
Pitcairn's 47 inhabitants, almost all of whom are interrelated, were bitterly divided by the charges against what constituted most of the adult male population. Many Pitcairn Island men blamed the British police for persuading the women involved to press charges. Some of the women agreed. Sources close to the case said that several women withdrew their charges due to family pressure.

On 28 September 2004, Olive Christian, wife of the accused mayor, daughter of Len Brown and mother of Randy Christian, both of whom were also among those accused, called a meeting of thirteen of the island's women, representing three generations at her home, Big Fence, to "defend" the island's men. Claiming that underage sex had been accepted as a Polynesian tradition since the settlement of the island in 1790, Olive Christian said of her girlhood, "We all thought sex was like food on the table." Carol Warren's two daughters also said that they had both been sexually active from the age of 12, with one of them claiming that she started having sex at 13, "and I felt hot shit about it, too". They and other women present at the meeting, who endorsed their view that underage sex was normal on Pitcairn, stated emphatically that all of the alleged rape victims had been willing participants.

Charlene Warren, who withdrew charges against a Pitcairn man, claimed that detectives had offered her money to testify; when pressed, she clarified that the money referred to statutory "compensation for victims of crime". Some women came up with a conspiracy theory that the trial was part of "a British plot to jail the [community's] able-bodied men and 'close' the island". "They've picked on all the viable young men, the ones who are the backbone of this place", said one, Meralda Warren. Not all women on the island were such defenders. Some present at the Big Fence meeting sat "silent and appeared ill at ease", giving reporters the impression that they did not hold the same views.

While many islanders were fearful that the outcome of the trial could sound the death-knell of the small country, others expressed optimism that it could mark a new beginning for Pitcairn as people previously excluded from the power structure would find themselves needed and appreciated for their skills and contributions. Many Pitcairners felt unfairly treated; for instance, Mike Warren said the whole trial was a "setup" from the start. Former Pitcairn resident Reeve Cooze told Radio New Zealand "The Pitcairn people have been bullied."

== Timeline of the trial ==
The trial opened on Pitcairn on 30 September.

Four days later on 4 October, a former islander, in a written statement read out by police, alleged that Mayor Steve Christian had raped her twice in 1972 when she was 12, once in bushland and once in a boat moored at Bounty Bay. She said that he used adolescent girls as his personal harem. "Steve seemed to take it upon himself to initiate all the girls, and it was like we were his harem," she stated. She had not informed her parents or others in the community, she said, because she "knew nothing would be done about it because of previous experience on the island."

On 8 October, Dave Brown, brother-in-law to Mayor Steve Christian, pleaded guilty to two charges of indecently assaulting a 14-year-old girl in the mid-1980s, and to a charge of molesting a 15-year-old girl during a spear-fishing trip in 1986.

The court listened to an interview recorded on Pitcairn in 2000, in which Brown, when asked if he had been in love, replied to police: "Yes, I was. We got closer and closer," was his view of himself and the 13-year-old girl, with whom he had repeated sexual contact over a long period in the mid-1980s. He was then in his early 30s, and married with children. Their first sexual encounter had taken place in undergrowth behind the general store after he met her in the village square. About a month later, they had sex again when they met after swimming. According to Brown's account to police, after the second sexual encounter, the girl had said that she enjoyed the sexual encounters and wanted more of it. Seeing each other more than once a month was difficult, however; greater frequency would make it difficult to keep what Brown characterised as an "affair" secret. Despite being confronted by his wife, Lea, and despite being asked by the island's police officer on behalf of the girl's mother to leave her alone, Brown renewed his sexual contacts with the girl after a six-month interval. "She didn't want to let go and neither did I," Brown said. The sexual contact continued until the girl left the island at the age of 16. At the beginning of the police investigation in 2000, the woman was one of many complainants, but she withdrew her allegations against Brown before the trial.

In the video, Brown told the police that it was "a normal part of Pitcairn life" for adult men to have sex with girls of 12 or 13. "It didn't seem wrong," he said. Most islanders, including his parents, had started having sex at a young age, and each generation had followed the one before it, he contended. He said, however, that he had rethought the widespread acceptance of underage sex, and had concluded that it was not appropriate. Of his own conduct with the 13-year-old girl, he said, "I regret it now. Times are changing. Things are moving forward, and obviously what we did then was not normal."

Defence lawyers representing the seven accused presented their final submissions on 21 October. Much of the day was dominated by the defence of Randy Christian, the 30-year-old son of Mayor Steve Christian. The younger Christian was accused of five rapes and seven indecent assaults against four women between 1988 and 1999. He was also alleged to have targeted a five- or seven-year-old girl from 1989 or 1991 onwards and to have abused her continuously over the following decade. He admitted to having sex with an under-age girl of 11 or 12.

Defence lawyer Allan Roberts claimed that Christian's relationship with the child had been consensual. The girl, who was 20 at the time of the trial, was the one who sparked off the police inquiry four years previously when she told her mother of the abuse she had suffered. Her mother in turn told Gail Cox, the visiting British police officer. That was the first the outside world knew of the prevalence of sexual abuse on Pitcairn. Roberts produced love letters written by the girl before Christian left Pitcairn for Norfolk Island, to support his claim that she had been infatuated with Christian. According to Roberts, this infatuation continued after Christian left the island. He said that in her statement to police, she confessed to "having a crush on Randy even though he is no longer on the island." He called her "a cold and cruel and vengeful liar who would stop at nothing to draw attention back to herself ... a woman scorned," whose complaint to the police was nothing other than revenge for his having abandoned her.

Public prosecutor Simon Moore rejected this defence, charging that Christian had exploited their ten-year age gap and his superior physical strength for his own advantage. While admitting that for a girl to have a crush on an older man was nothing out of the ordinary, and that there were few unattached young men available, Moore maintained that Christian had taken advantage of the girl's naivety, ignorance, and innocence. "He flattered her, he played her and he lured her into situations where he could do as he wished," Moore said. He added that, after reading a leaflet about sexual harassment distributed by Constable Cox, the girl had realised that Christian's treatment of her was unacceptable. The court was told that during the period in question, Christian had two girlfriends of legal age. One was a pest control officer who came to Pitcairn to rid the island of rats.

== Verdict and aftermath ==
On 24 October 2004, the Pitcairn Supreme Court convicted six of the seven accused on 35 of the 55 charges. Only Jay Warren, the former Magistrate (1990–1999), was acquitted on all counts. Chief Justice Charles Blackie ridiculed Mayor Steve Christian's claim that his relationship with one of his victims had been consensual. "She was young, naive and vulnerable," Blackie said. "She was secreted into the bushes and there the accused took advantage of her. There had been no affection, kissing or romantic connection. She did not want it to happen."

The controversy over the trial continued. On 26 October 2004, prosecutor Simon Moore told Radio New Zealand that the charges and the verdicts were only the tip of the iceberg, accounting for only one-third of the cases police learned about when they began their investigations. He said that more charges were due to be laid involving people now living in Australia and New Zealand, but he declined to provide further details citing "extensive name suppression orders in place." Moore said that some of these victims had indicated an interest in returning to Pitcairn. But, they would have had to be satisfied that justice had been done and that the island was a safe place for their families.

Auckland lawyer Christopher Harder, who represented one of the accused, appealed for mercy in view of the social devastation he said would be caused by the imprisonment of most of the island's able-bodied men. He proposed that the men make a public apology and pay compensation to their victims, instead of facing imprisonment, which, he said, could mean the end of the microstate.

Professor John Connell of the University of Sydney said that if the men were imprisoned, they would have to be released temporarily whenever needed to man the longboat, without which the island could not connect with the outside world. "It would be a punishment for the whole community" if they were not, said the South Pacific scholar. Some islanders expressed fears that without the convicted men, there would not be enough who could handle the longboat. Others, less connected with the case, noted that the defendants had prevented other islanders from becoming more skilled at handling the boats. This was another example of the "power and control" problems which existed on the island. Public Defender Paul Dacre called on the court to impose sentences in keeping with the unique circumstances of the island society. "We are talking about 50 people living on a rock, not 50 million in England," he said.

Pending sentencing on 27 October, lawyers for the six convicted pleaded for clemency, arguing that it was essential for the survival of the dependency. Only two of the six expressed regret. Dennis Christian emailed his principal victim to apologise and expressed his "deep remorse," the court was told, and Dave Brown made a statement through his lawyer that he "regretted any distress caused." His father, Len Brown, refused to apologise for his own offences; his lawyer, Allan Roberts, told the court that to do so would be "fraudulent."

The Pitcairn Supreme Court handed down sentences tailored, said Chief Justice Charles Blackie, to the unique conditions of Pitcairn Island, on 29 October. Dennis Christian and Dave Brown were sentenced to community service, apparently in recognition of the remorse they had shown at the trial.

Mayor Steve Christian, Randy Christian, and Len Brown were all sentenced to prison terms ranging from two to six years. (See the defendants for details.) Elaborating on Chief Justice Blackie's statement, Bryan Nicholson of the British High Commission in New Zealand said, "The penalties were tailored to Pitcairn and take into account the unique isolation, population of less than 50, and the dependence of manpower." None of the sentences were carried out until 2006, pending a ruling by the Privy Council on the legal validity of British sovereignty and judicial authority on Pitcairn.

Bryan Nicolson, a spokesman for the British High Commission in New Zealand, announced on 30 October that Governor Richard Fell had formally dismissed Steve Christian from the mayoralty, and his son, Randy, from the chairmanship of the powerful Internal Committee. The dismissal followed Christian's refusal to resign when asked to do so by Deputy Governor Matthew Forbes. Christian's conviction and dismissal left the islanders with a power vacuum. On 8 November 2004, the Island Council named Christian's sister, Brenda, interim mayor pending elections scheduled for 15 December 2004. The position was won by Jay Warren.

Brian Michael John Young was found guilty in January 2007 of rape and indecent assault. In December, he was sentenced to six years and six months in prison. He was ordered to be transported to Pitcairn to serve out his sentence.

== Appeals ==
The six convicts began their appeal in the Pitcairn Supreme Court, in Papakura, New Zealand, on 18 April 2005. Defence lawyers argued that as Pitcairn's colonial rulers had never enforced British law, the six men convicted of sex crimes could not have known that their acts were illegal, a claim rejected as "extraordinary" by public prosecutor Simon Moore. If true, he said, Pitcairn had been "a zone of criminal immunity", an enclave where serious crimes could be committed with impunity. The proceedings were relayed live to the Adamstown courthouse, on Pitcairn, by a video linkup. About twenty locals, including the accused, watched the hearing.

Crown prosecutors produced numerous old documents to refute the defence that British law had never been enforced on Pitcairn, or that the Pitcairners had never known that they were subject to it. According to the documents, the islanders had, over a period of many years, sought British advice and intervention in cases related to adultery, abortion, kleptomania, attempted murder (including a 1936 case in which a husband and wife tried to kill each other), and the theft of women's underwear. Crown Prosecutor Simon Mount said the charges had been referred to British authorities because they were too serious to be dealt with locally, and proved that Pitcairners were fully aware of British law and of its applicability to them.

Betty Christian, the Island Secretary, broke ranks with many of her fellow Pitcairners, testifying at the Pitcairn Supreme Court hearing in Papakura that the islanders were aware that they were British subjects and that British law was applicable to them. She also flatly contradicted the defence that sexual activity at a young age was considered "normal" on Pitcairn, saying that Pitcairn's values were no different from those of any other modern society.

On 24 May 2005, the Auckland court rejected the appeal of the six convicted men. It carried over their bail until their further appeal could be heard by the Judicial Committee of the Privy Council, in 2006. Former Pitcairn resident Shawn Christian, 29, then living in Australia, announced a legal challenge to the validity of New Zealand lawyers' and judges' participation in a trial in a British colony on 27 November 2005. Christian appeared to have the support of others awaiting trial. Shawn Christian, whose alleged offences (three rapes) are said to have happened between 1994 and 1996, is the younger son of former Mayor Steve Christian.

An additional appeal brought by the Public Defender was heard by the Court of Appeal on 31 January 2006. The basis of the appeal was the validity of the laws applied to the accused, with the defence arguing that British law had not been ratified on Pitcairn. "We are arguing whether the English legal system applies to these people. That is it in a nutshell," defence lawyer Allan Roberts said. The Pitcairn Court of Appeal dismissed this claim. Randall Christian's appeal against conviction of indecent assault of a girl aged under 13 was upheld, but that decision did not affect his sentence of six years on other charges. The men appealed to the Judicial Committee of the Privy Council in London. The Privy Council terminated the appeal abruptly in July 2006, saying that the argument that Pitcairn has always been self-governing was unrealistic. The final appeals for all six men failed on 30 October 2006.

== Defendants ==
The defendants who lived on the island were:

- Steven Raymond Christian (Steve Christian) (born January 1951), mayor since 1999. He was charged with a total of six rapes and four indecent assaults committed between 1964 and 1975. He pleaded not guilty to all charges of rape and sexual abuse. He admitted to two sexual encounters with underage females, which he said were consensual. Christian was convicted of five rapes, and cleared of four indecent assaults and one rape. He was sentenced to three years' imprisonment. Still protesting his innocence and refusing to resign, he was dismissed from office on 30 October 2004 by Governor Richard Fell.
- Randy Christian (born March 1974) son of Steve Christian, was Chairman of the powerful Internal Committee, which effectively made him his father's deputy. He faced five charges of rape and seven of indecent assault against four women between 1988 and 1999. He was also accused of targeting one girl from the age of five or seven, abusing her repeatedly over the next decade. He admitted to having under-age sex with a girl of 11 or 12. He was convicted of four rapes (against the same girl from the age of 10) and five indecent assault charges, but cleared of one rape and two indecent assaults. His six-year prison sentence was the most severe ever handed down on Pitcairn. Governor Fell dismissed him from the chairmanship of the Internal Committee on 30 October 2004, following his refusal to resign.
- Len Carlyle Brown (born March 1926) Steve Christian's father-in-law, was convicted of two rapes. Through his lawyer, Allan Roberts, Brown refused to apologize. To do so would be "fraudulent," Roberts said. He was sentenced to two years imprisonment, but on account of his age, he was allowed to apply for home detention instead.
- Dave Brown, or Len Calvin Davis Brown (born October 1954) son of Len Brown, pleaded guilty on 8 October 2004 to two charges of indecent assault against a 14-year-old girl and one charge of molesting a 15-year-old girl. He continued to deny 12 other charges, including one of forcing a 5-year-old girl to give him oral sex. Brown was found guilty of nine indecent assaults against three girls, but was cleared of four charges of indecent assault and two of gross indecency. Earlier, he had told British journalist Kathy Marks that he hated reporters and was sick of their "lies." After the verdict, however, his lawyer, Charles Cato, told the court that Brown "regretted any distress caused." He was sentenced to 400 hours' community service and was ordered to undergo counselling.
- Dennis Ray Christian (born 1957) pleaded guilty on 5 October 2004 to two charges of sexual assault and one of indecent assault against young girls. The court was told on 27 October 2004 that Christian had e-mailed his principal victim to apologize and express his "deep remorse." He was sentenced to 300 hours' community service and was ordered to undergo counselling.
- Carlisle Terry Young (born 1958) a descendant of HMS Bounty midshipman Ned Young, faced one charge of rape and seven of indecent assault over a period of almost 20 years. He was convicted of one rape and six indecent assaults, but was cleared of one indecent assault charge. Young was sentenced to five years imprisonment. He resented being photographed at the trial, and shoved reporter Kathy Marks aside when she tried to take his picture.
- Jay Warren (born July 1956) former magistrate of the Pitcairn Islands from 1990 to 1999, when his office was replaced by that of the mayor following a constitutional revision. Warren was cleared of his indecent assault charge.

== In popular culture ==
Wondery produced a podcast titled The Pitcairn Trials which was released in 2024 and 2025. The podcast is hosted by Luke Jones.

Sam Denby-led podcast Extremities about Pitcairn Island mentions the trials in episode 6.
