= Bounty Day =

Holiday on Pitcairn and Norfolk islands

Bounty Day is a holiday on both Pitcairn Island, destination of the Bounty mutineers, and on Norfolk Island. It is celebrated on 23 January on Pitcairn, and on 8 June on Norfolk Island, the day that the descendants of the mutineers arrived on the respective islands. It is named for HMS Bounty, although the ship never saw Norfolk Island.

== Pitcairn ==
Bounty Day is celebrated on Pitcairn Island on 23 January, in commemoration of the burning of Bounty by the mutineers in 1790. Model replicas, made by the islanders, are burned.

== Norfolk Island ==
Bounty Day is the national holiday of Norfolk Island, celebrated annually on 8 June, in memory of the arrival of the Pitcairn Islanders on Norfolk Island in 1856. Prior to 8 June 1856, Norfolk Island had been a penal colony, but the Pitcairners received land grants (from Queen Victoria) upon their arrival at Norfolk Island in 1856.

=== Sequence of events ===
Bounty Day starts off with a re-enactment of the landing of the Pitcairners down at the Kingston Pier. The Pitcairners are greeted by the Administrator and his wife, and from the pier they march to the cenotaph where they lay wreaths in remembrance. Many families maintain a "Bounty box" of period clothing, handed down through generations, which they wear during the re-enactment. From the cenotaph they then march to the cemetery where hymns are sung. Next, they proceed to Government House where a family surnamed either Quintal, Evans, McCoy, Buffett, Adams, Nobbs, Christian or Young (being descendants of the Pitcairners of that ilk) is awarded the title of 'Family of the Year'. The children roll down the hill in front of Government House, after which the whole procession travels to the Compound where the children play games and partake of a communal feast featuring traditional Norfolk dishes such as pilhi, green banana fritters, and Tahitian fish. Finally, everyone returns home to prepare for the Bounty Ball, at which there is a competition in further celebration of Bounty Day.

== See also ==
- Public holidays in Australia
- Public holidays in the United Kingdom
