= Bounty Bay =

Bay on Pitcairn Island

Coordinates: 25°4′6″S 130°5′45″W

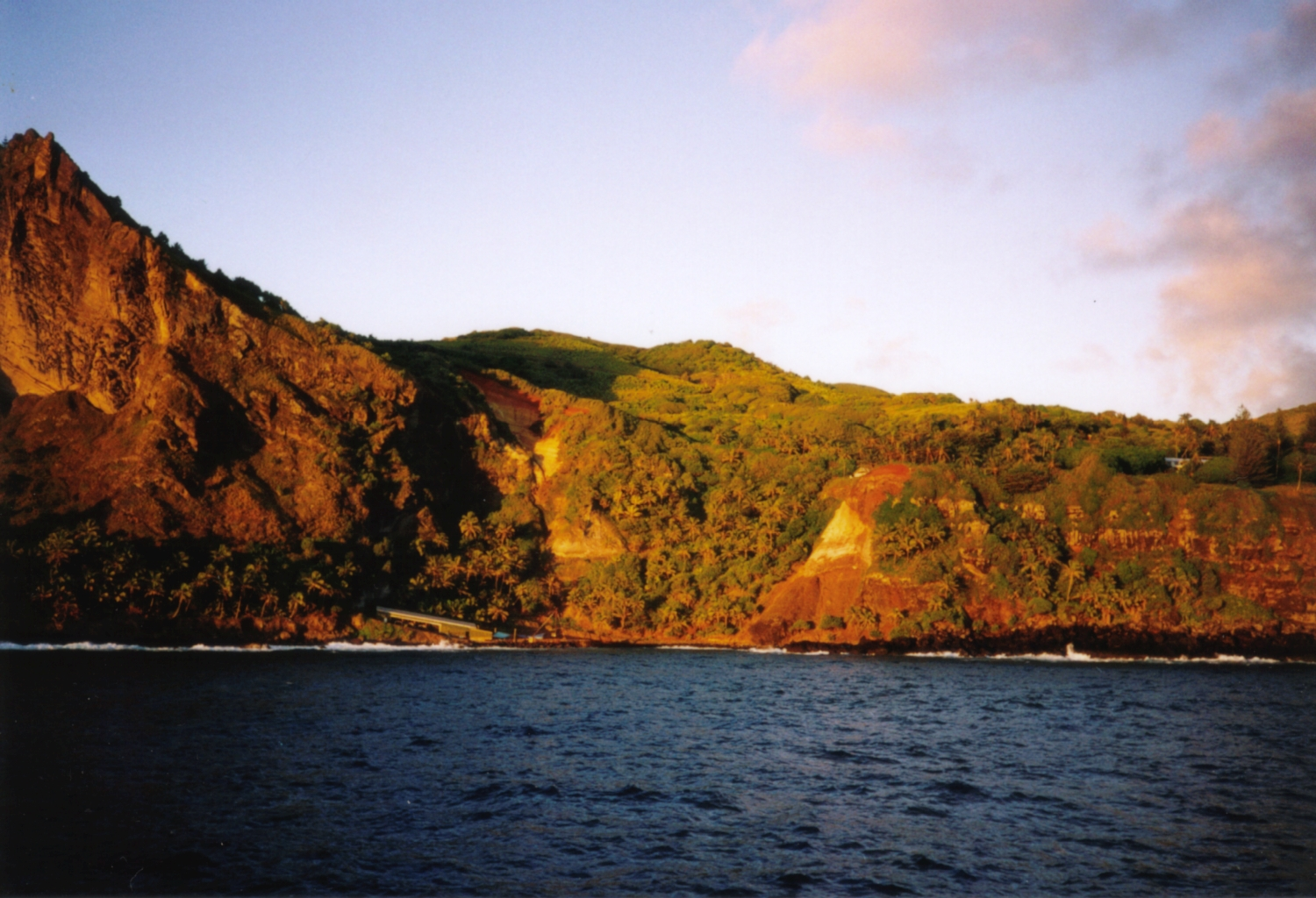
Bounty Bay, Pitcairn Island, at dawn

Bounty Bay is an embayment of the Pacific Ocean into Pitcairn Island. It is named after the Bounty, a British naval vessel whose eighteenth-century mutiny was immortalized in the novel Mutiny on the Bounty, and the numerous subsequent motion pictures made of it. The mutineers sailed the Bounty to Pitcairn Island and destroyed it by fire in the bay. Current Pitcairn Islanders are largely patrilineal descendants of the mutineers and their Tahitian wives, as exhibited by some of their surnames.

Travellers to Pitcairn are usually brought by longboat into Bounty Bay.
