= Mike Warren (mayor) =

Pitcairnese politician

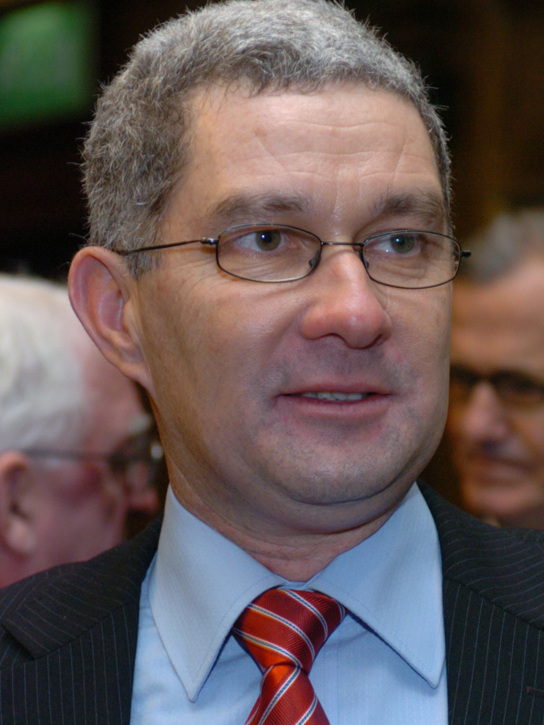

3rd Mayor of Pitcairn Islands
- In office 1 January 2008 – 31 December 2013
- Governor: George Duncan Fergusson; Victoria Marguerite Treadell
- Preceded by: Jay Calvin Warren
- Succeeded by: Shawn Brent Christian

Personal details
- Born: Michael Calvert Warren; 1964 (age 61–62) Adamstown, Pitcairn Islands
- Conviction: Possession of materials depicting child pornography
- Sentence: 20 months' imprisonment

Michael Calvert Warren (born 1964) is a Pitcairnese politician, who was Mayor of the Pitcairn Islands from 2008 to 2013.

== Child pornography ==
In December 2010, Warren was charged with possessing indecent photos of children and possessing pornographic images, videos and documents involving children. Warren fought to have his case tried in Pitcairn; Crown prosecutors sought to try him in New Zealand. His application was rejected in a hearing held in May 2012, whilst still in office.

In 2016, Warren was found guilty of downloading more than 1,000 images and videos of child sexual abuse. During the time he downloaded the images he was working in child protection. Warren began downloading the images after six male residents on the island, including the then mayor, were found guilty during the Pitcairn sexual assault trial of 2004. Warren was also convicted of engaging in a "sex chat" with someone who he believed was a 15-year-old girl.

In 2018, the Privy Council refused a bid for appeal, saying that Warren's attempt to appeal using constitutional grounds was an abuse of process.

== Indecency conviction ==
In October 2020 Warren was arrested on three charges of indecent behaviour in a public place, after being accused of walking around the island naked on multiple occasions, including walks through its central square and past its church. In December 2021, he was found guilty of the charges and fined $150. As part of their investigation, police found additional images of Warren walking around the island naked between 2001 and 2010.
