= Pitcairn Islanders =

Inhabitants of Pacific Ocean islands

Pitcairn Islanders Pitkern Ailena
Total population
- 800–1,000 worldwide

Regions with significant populations
- Pitcairn Islands: 35 (2023)
- Norfolk Island: 484 (2016)
- Australia: 262 (2016)
- New Zealand: 48 (2018 birthplace)
- United Kingdom: 30

Languages
- English; Pitkern

Religion
- Christianity (Seventh-day Adventist Church)

Related ethnic groups
- English people; Tahitians; Scottish people; Irish people; Cornish people; Manx people; Norfolk Islanders

Pitcairn Islanders, also referred to as Pitkerners and Pitcairnese, are the native inhabitants of the Pitcairn Islands, a British Overseas Territory including people whose families were previously inhabitants and maintaining cultural connections. Most Pitcairn Islanders are descendants of the Bounty mutineers and Tahitians.

The mainstream Pitcairn culture is a mixture of British (specifically English, Manx and Scottish) and Polynesian (specifically Tahitian) cultures derived from the traditions of the settlers that landed in 1790, plus a few that settled afterwards. As of 2021, there were a total of 47 people inhabiting the island.

There is also a Pitcairnese diaspora, particularly in Norfolk Island, New Zealand and mainland Australia. Fearing overcrowding, in 1856 all 194 Pitkerners immigrated to Norfolk Island aboard the Morayshire (including a baby Anna Christian born en route) but 16 of them returned to Pitcairn on the Mary Ann in 1858, followed by a further four families in 1864.

== History ==
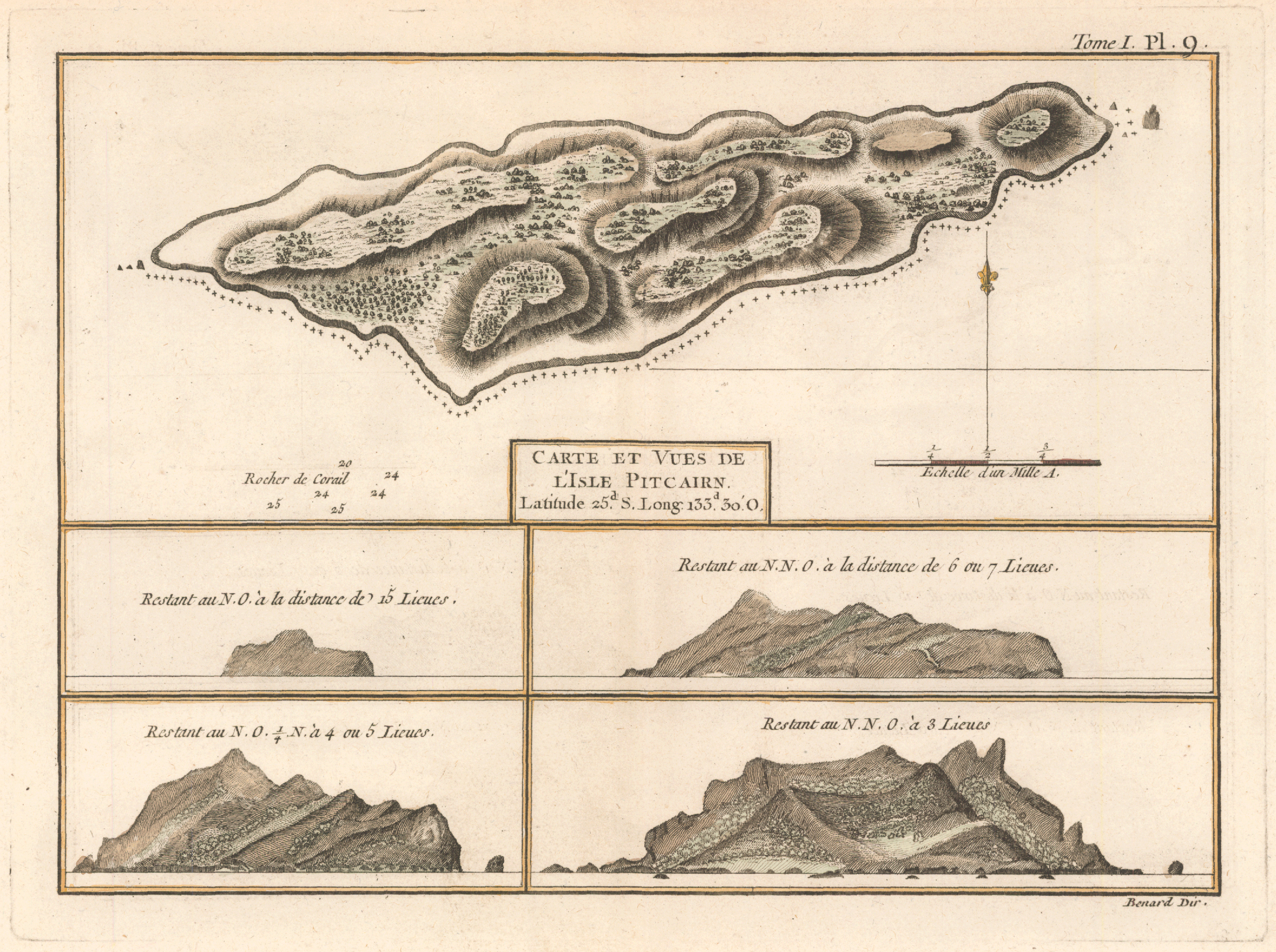
Early map of Pitcairn by Jacques Renaud Benard published in 1774.

=== Colonisation ===
Pitcairn Island was sighted on 3 July 1767 by the crew of the British sloop HMS Swallow, commanded by Captain Philip Carteret. The island was named after Scottish midshipman Robert Pitcairn, a fifteen-year-old crew member who was the first to sight the island.

“we discovered land to the northward of us. Upon approaching it the next day (Friday, 3 July), it appeared like a great rock rising from the sea... and it having been discovered by a young gentleman, son to Major Pitcairn of the Marines, we called it Pitcairn’s Island.”

— Philip Carteret

These words, recorded in Carteret's log, describe the first sighting. Robert Pitcairn was a son of British marine major John Pitcairn, who later was killed at the Battle of Bunker Hill in the American Revolution.

=== Settlement of Pitcairn ===
In 1790, nine of the mutineers from the Bounty, along with the native Tahitian men and women who were with them (six men, eleven women and a baby girl), settled on Pitcairn Islands and set fire to the Bounty. The nine were Fletcher Christian, John Mills, William Brown, Isaac Martin, John Williams, John Adams, William McCoy, Matthew Quintal, and Edward Young.

The wreck is still visible underwater in Bounty Bay, discovered in 1957 by National Geographic explorer Luis Marden. Although the settlers survived by farming and fishing, the initial period of settlement was marked by serious tensions among them. Alcoholism, murder, disease and other ills took the lives of most mutineers and Tahitian men. John Adams and Ned Young turned to the scriptures, using the ship's Bible as their guide for a new and peaceful society. Young eventually died of an asthmatic infection. The Polynesians also converted to Christianity (Church of England). After the rediscovery of Pitcairn, John Adams was granted amnesty for his part in the mutiny.

== Population history ==
Year	Population
1790	27
1800	34 (two men and nine women from the Bounty remain)
1810	50
1820	66
1830	70
1840	119
1850	146 (last person from the Bounty, Teraura died)
1856*	193 (uninhabited after emigration to Norfolk Island)
1859**	16 (lowest, after first group returns from Norfolk Island)
1870	70
1880	112
1890	136
1900	136
1910	140
1920	163
1930	190
1936	250 (highest)
1940	163
1950	161
1960	126
1970	96
1975	74
1980	61
1985	58
1986	68
1987	59
1988	55
1989	55
1990	59
1991	66
1992	54
1993	57
1994	54
1995	55
1996	43
1997	40
1998	66
1999	46
2000	51
2001	44
2002	48
2003	59
2006	65
2007	64
2008	66
2009	67
2010	64
2011	67
2012	48
2013	55
2014	56
2015	–
2016	49
2017	–
2018	50
2021	47
2023	35

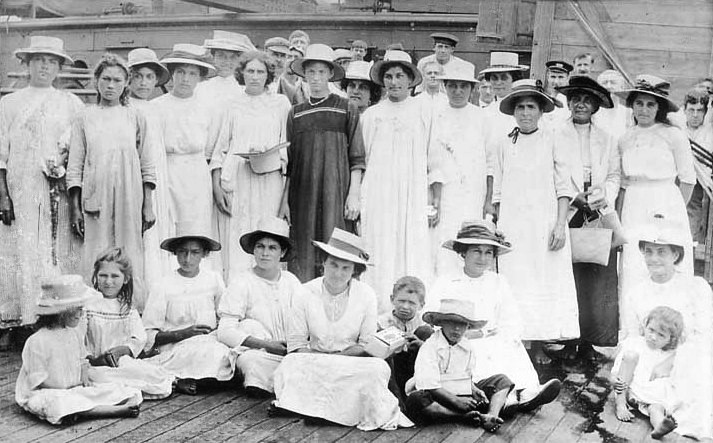
Pitcairn Islanders in 1916.

=== Surnames ===
As a result of the families who returned to the island starting in 1859 after settling Norfolk Island, most names therefore are descended from those six families. Occasionally a new person would arrive on the island bringing with them a new surname such as the American Samuel Russell Warren born 1830 in Rhode Island, U.S., fathered children with Agnes Christian (daughter of Thursday October Christian II), whose descendants still live on the island today. The McCoy surname (from the mutineer William McCoy) died out in 1973 with the death of Violet McCoy, who had married Floyd Hastings McCoy, a great-great grandson of William.

List of surnames in 2016
Rank	Surname	Population	Origins
1	Christian	15	Manx, English
2	Warren	10	English
3	Warren-Peu	6	English-Polynesian
4	Brown	4	English
5	Young	3	Manx, English
6	Lupton-Christian	2	Manx, English
6	Griffiths	2	Welsh
7	Evans	1	Welsh
7	Jaques	1	French
7	Menzies	1	Scottish
7	O'Keefe	1	Irish
7	Peu	1	Polynesian

== Culture ==
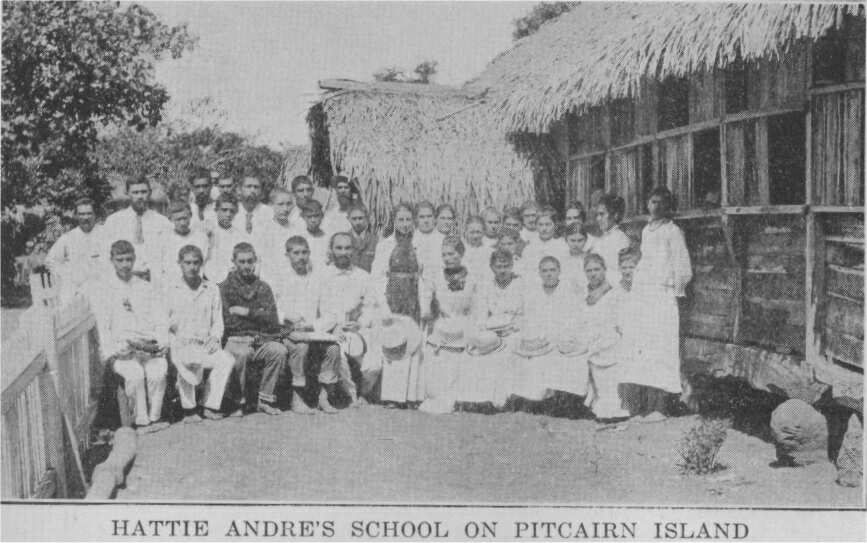
Hattie Andre's school, Pitcairn Island.

The once-strict moral codes, which prohibited dancing, public displays of affection, smoking, and consumption of alcohol, have been relaxed in recent years. Islanders and visitors no longer require a six-month licence to purchase, import, and consume alcohol. There is now one licensed café and bar on the island, and the Government Store sells alcohol and cigarettes.

Fishing and swimming are two popular recreational activities. A birthday celebration or the arrival of a ship or yacht will involve the entire Pitcairn community in a public dinner in the Square, Adamstown. Tables are covered in a variety of foods, including fish, meat, chicken, pilhi, baked rice, boiled plun (banana), breadfruit, vegetable dishes, an assortment of pies, bread, breadsticks, an array of desserts, pineapple and watermelon.

Public work ensures the ongoing maintenance of the island's numerous roads and paths. The island has a labour force of over 35 men and women (as of 2011).

=== Language ===
The majority of the resident Pitcairn Islanders are the descendants of the Bounty mutineers and Tahitians (or other Polynesians). Pitkern is a creole language derived from 18th-century English, with elements of the Tahitian language. It is spoken as a first language by the population and is taught alongside standard English at the island's only school. It is closely related to the creole language Norfuk, spoken on Norfolk Island, because Norfolk was repopulated in the mid-19th century by Pitcairners.

=== Religion ===
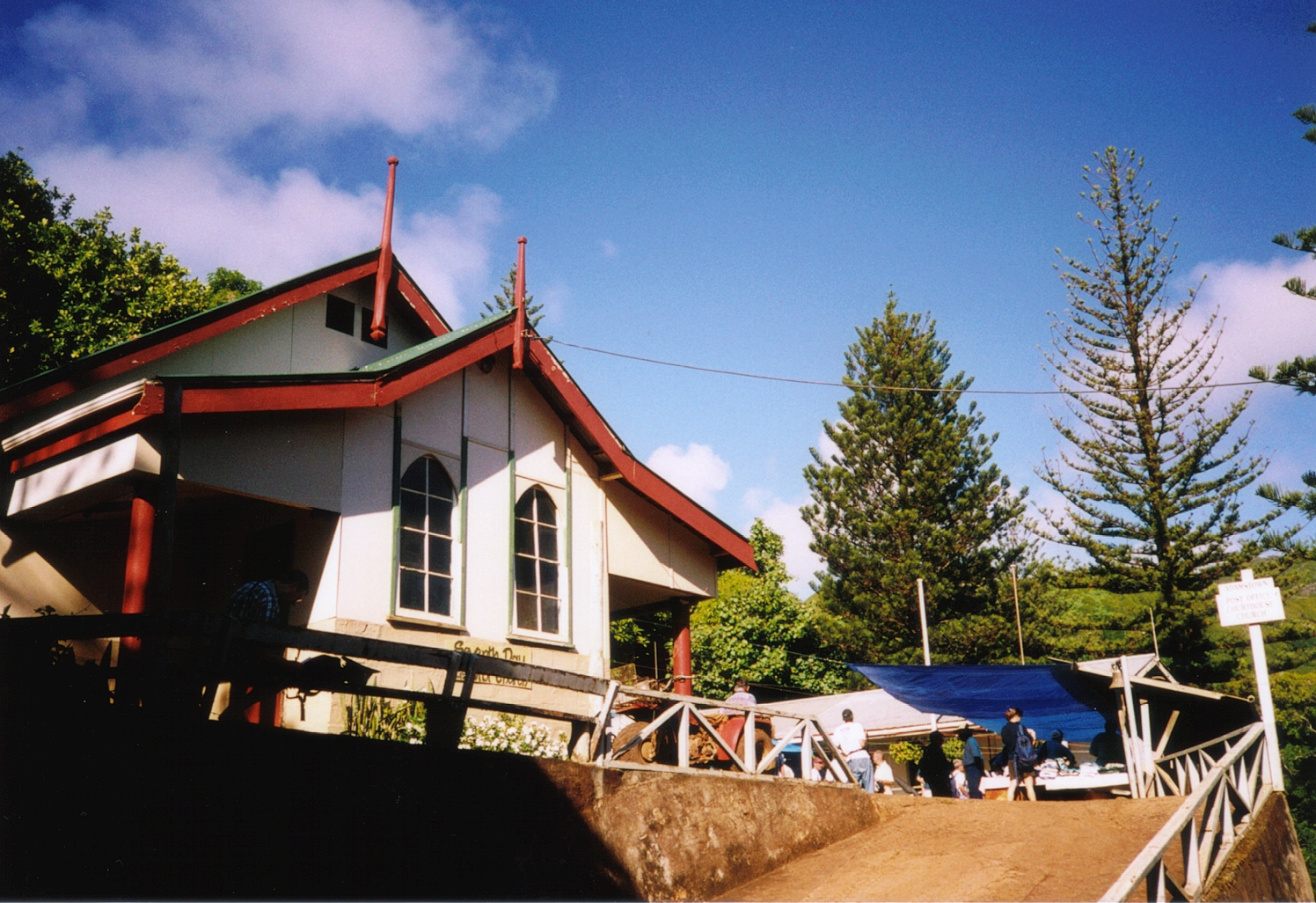
Church of Adamstown.

The entire population is Seventh-day Adventist. A successful Seventh-day Adventist mission in the 1890s was important in shaping Pitcairn society. In recent years, the church has declined, with only about eight islanders worshipping regularly, but most of them still attend church on special occasions. The Sabbath is observed as a day of rest and as a mark of respect for observant Adventists.

The church was built in 1954 and is run by the Church board and resident pastor, who usually serves a two-year term. The Sabbath School meets at 10 am on Saturday mornings, and is followed by Divine Service an hour later. On Tuesday evenings there is another service in the form of a prayer meeting.

== Diaspora ==
=== Australia ===
The 2016 census showed that there were a total of 746 people with Pitcairn ancestry. However, this includes the population claiming Pitcairn descent in Norfolk Island. There were 262 people of Pitcairn ancestry for the usually resident population in other states and territories of Australia (notably Queensland and New South Wales).

In the 2011 Australian census, there were 75 people speaking the Pitkern language (also called Pitcairnese) at home, an increase of 21% from the 2006 census which had 62 people speaking the language.

==== Norfolk Island ====
The 2016 Australian census included Norfolk Island for the first time. It showed that 20.0% or 484 people claimed Pitcairn ancestry. As in previous censuses, the 2011 Census asked a question relating to Pitcairn descent. Though for the first time, the 2011 Norfolk Island Census focuses on the Pitcairn descent of the "ordinarily resident population" rather than the "permanent population" of previous Censuses. 45.0 percent of the permanent population are of Pitcairn descent and 38.4 percent of the ordinarily resident population were of Pitcairn descent. Norfolk's Pitcairn descendants are already at least 7th or 8th generation, and those in younger age groups are probably 9th generation and the affinity with their heritage is naturally waning.

=== New Zealand ===
In the most recent 2018 census, 48 of the ‘usual residents population’ were born in Pitcairn island. In 2013 the Pitcairn Islander ethnic group comprised 177 people. 80.7 percent were born in New Zealand with 36 born overseas – 91.7% on Pitcairn Island. Between 2006 and 2013, the population decreased by 13.4 percent. This compares with an increase of 15.5 percent between 2001 and 2006.

- 96.6 percent lived in the North Island and 1.7 percent lived in the South Island.
- The most common region this group lived in was Wellington Region (59.3 percent).
- The median age (half are younger and half are older than this age) was 37.2 years.
- 81.9 percent were born in New Zealand and 19.4 percent were born overseas.

Ethnic identity:

- 27.1 percent said Pitcairn Islander was their only ethnicity.
- 35.6 percent said they belonged to two ethnic groups and 37.3 percent said they belonged to three or more ethnic groups.

== Notable Pitcairn Islanders ==
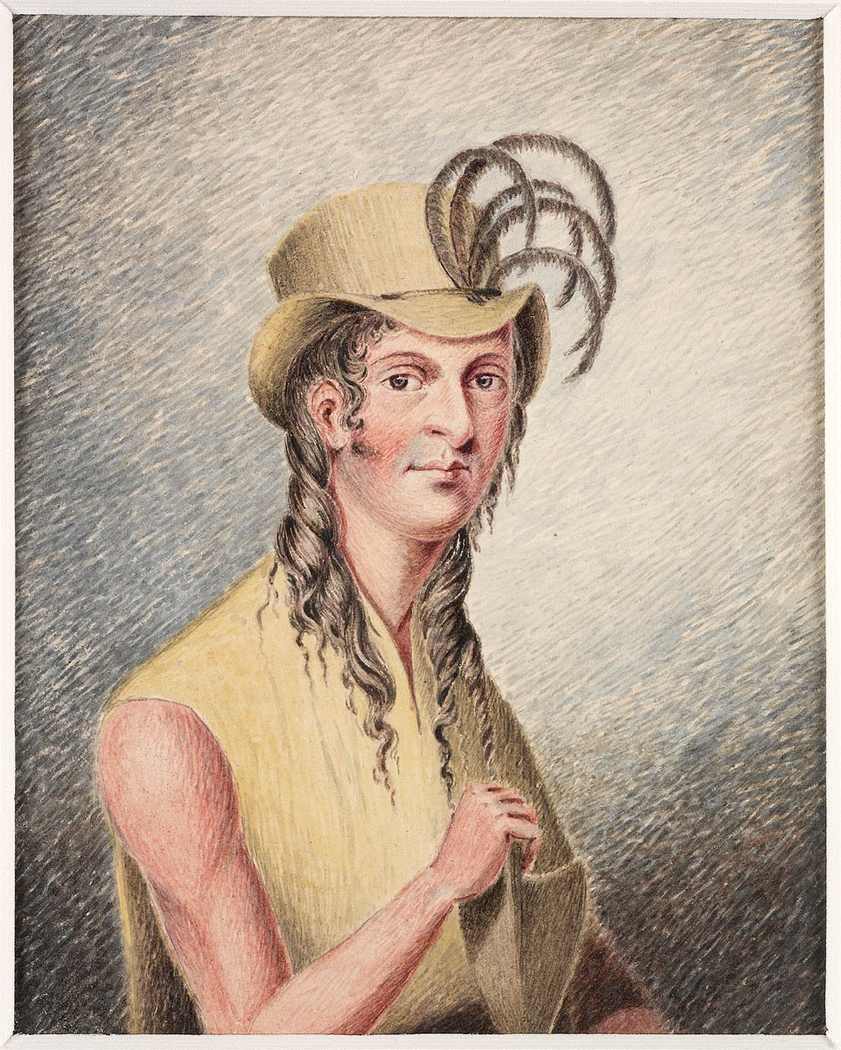
Thursday October Christian I

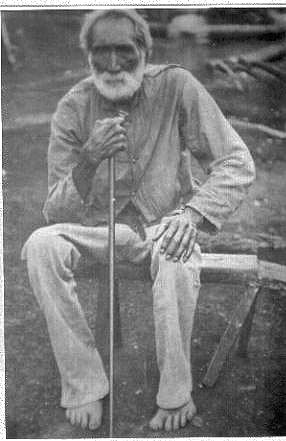
Thursday October Christian II

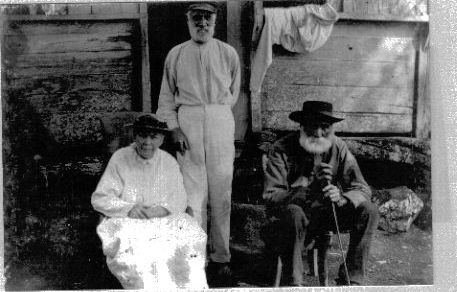
Moses Young & Albina McCoy

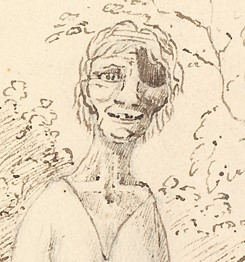
Teraura

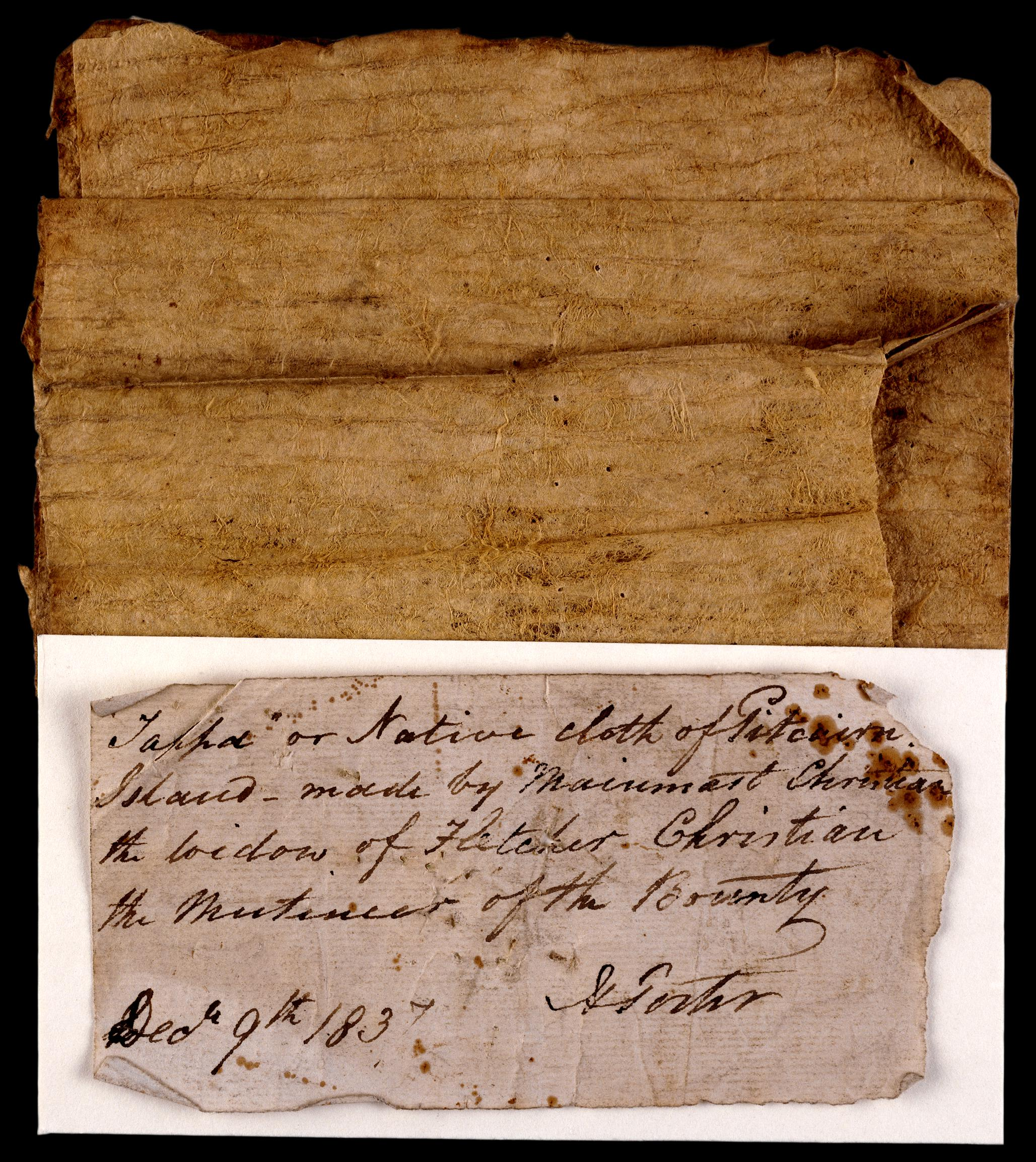
Mauatua

=== Diaspora ===
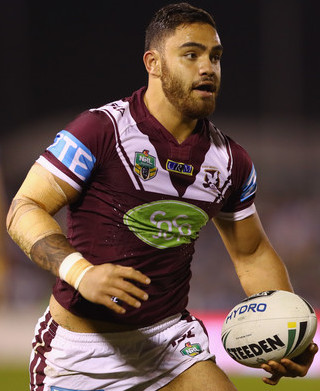
Dylan Walker

== See also ==
- nl:Lijst van Tahitiaanse partners van de opvarenden van de HMAV Bounty
- Bibliography of Pitcairn Islands
- Europeans in Oceania
- Island Council (Pitcairn)
- Law enforcement in the Pitcairn Islands
- Norfolk Islanders
- Outline of the Pitcairn Islands
