= History of the Pitcairn Islands =

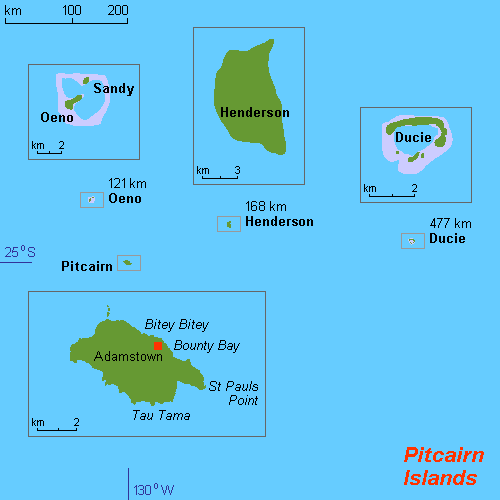
Map of Pitcairn Islands.

The history of the Pitcairn Islands begins with the colonization of the islands by Polynesians in the 11th century. Polynesian people established a culture that flourished for four centuries and then vanished. They lived on Pitcairn and Henderson Islands, and on Mangareva Island 540 kilometres (340 mi) to the northwest, for about 400 years.

In 1790, nine of the mutineers from HMS Bounty, led by Fletcher Christian, abducted 18 native Tahitians and settled on Pitcairn Island, afterwards setting fire to the Bounty. Christian's group continued under the auspices of Ned Young and John Adams until contacted by Mayhew Folger in 1808, by which time Adams was the only surviving mutineer.

== Polynesian society ==
The earliest known settlers of the Pitcairn Islands were Polynesians who appear to have settled on Pitcairn and Henderson Islands by at least the 11th Century, and on the more populous Mangareva Island 540 kilometres (340 mi) to the northwest, for several centuries. These first inhabitants may have maintained a trading relationship with Mangareva, in which they exchanged basalt, volcanic glass (obsidian) and oven stones for goods, including coral and pearl shells. Most trade occurred within the Pitcairn Islands; however, material from Pitcairn Island has been discovered on the Tuamotus and Austral Islands in French Polynesia. The alkaline basalt found at Tautama (on the south-east of Pitcairn Island) was used by early Polynesians to create some of the highest quality adzes in Polynesia; however, the adzes were not traded widely, likely due to the remoteness of the islands. It is not certain why this society disappeared, but it is probably related to the deforestation of Mangareva and the subsequent decline of its culture; Pitcairn was not capable of sustaining large numbers of people without a relationship with other populous islands. By the mid-1400s, the trade routes between the islands and French Polynesia had broken down. Important natural resources were exhausted and a period of civil war began on Mangareva, causing the small populations on Henderson and Pitcairn to be cut off and eventually become extinct.

The islands were uninhabited when they were rediscovered by the Portuguese explorer Pedro Fernandes de Queirós, working in the employ of Spain, in January 1606. The British rediscovered the island on 3 July 1767 on a voyage led by Captain Philip Carteret, and named it after the fifteen-year-old Robert Pitcairn (a son of the soldier John Pitcairn) who was the crew member who first spotted the island; he was lost at sea three years later. Carteret, who sailed without the newly invented marine chronometer, charted the island at 25°02′S 133°21′W, and although the latitude was reasonably accurate, his recorded longitude was incorrect by about 3° (330 km [210 mi]) west of the island. When the Bounty mutineers arrived on Pitcairn, it was uninhabited; however, a large number of archaeological items remained, such as marae, tiki carvings, adzes and adze flakes, rock carvings and petroglyphs.

The Polynesians that disappeared may have later migrated to a bigger island further to the southeast at Easter Island, where it has been noted that the jumping-off points for the early Polynesian colonization of Easter Island originally from Mangareva are more likely to have been from Pitcairn and Henderson, which lie about halfway between Mangareva and Easter. It has been observed that there is great similarity with the Rapa Nui language and Early Mangarevan, similarities between a statue found in Pitcairn and some statues found in Easter Island, the resemblance of tool styles in Easter Island to those in Mangareva and Pitcairn, and correspondences of skulls found in Easter Island to two skulls found in Henderson, all suggesting Pitcairn and Henderson islands to have been early stepping-stones from Mangareva to Easter Island, which in 1999, a voyage with reconstructed Polynesian boats was able to reach Easter Island from Mangareva after merely a seventeen and a half day voyage.

== British and Tahitian settlement ==
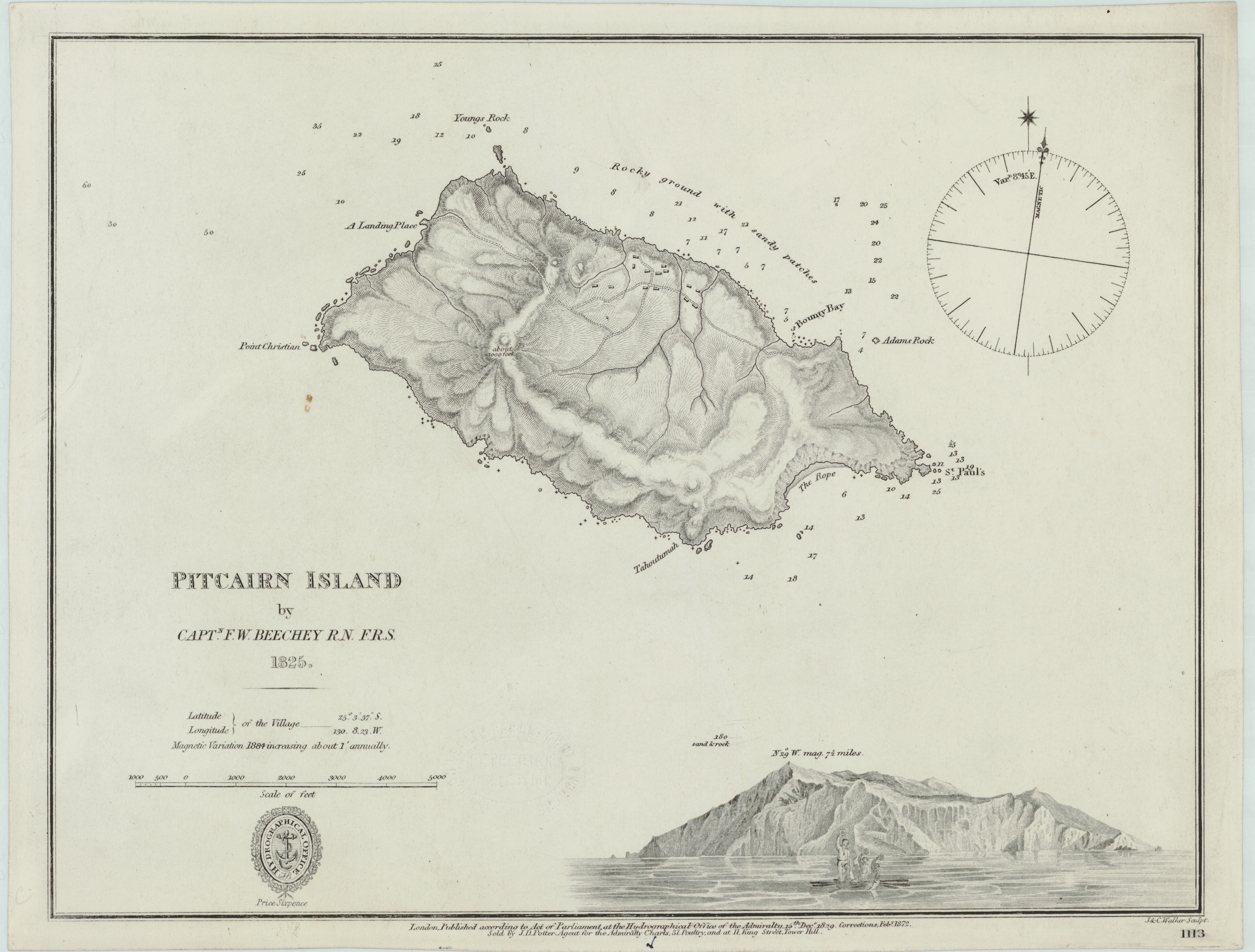
1825 Admiralty Chart No 1113 of Pitcairn Island showing "Adamstown" settlement

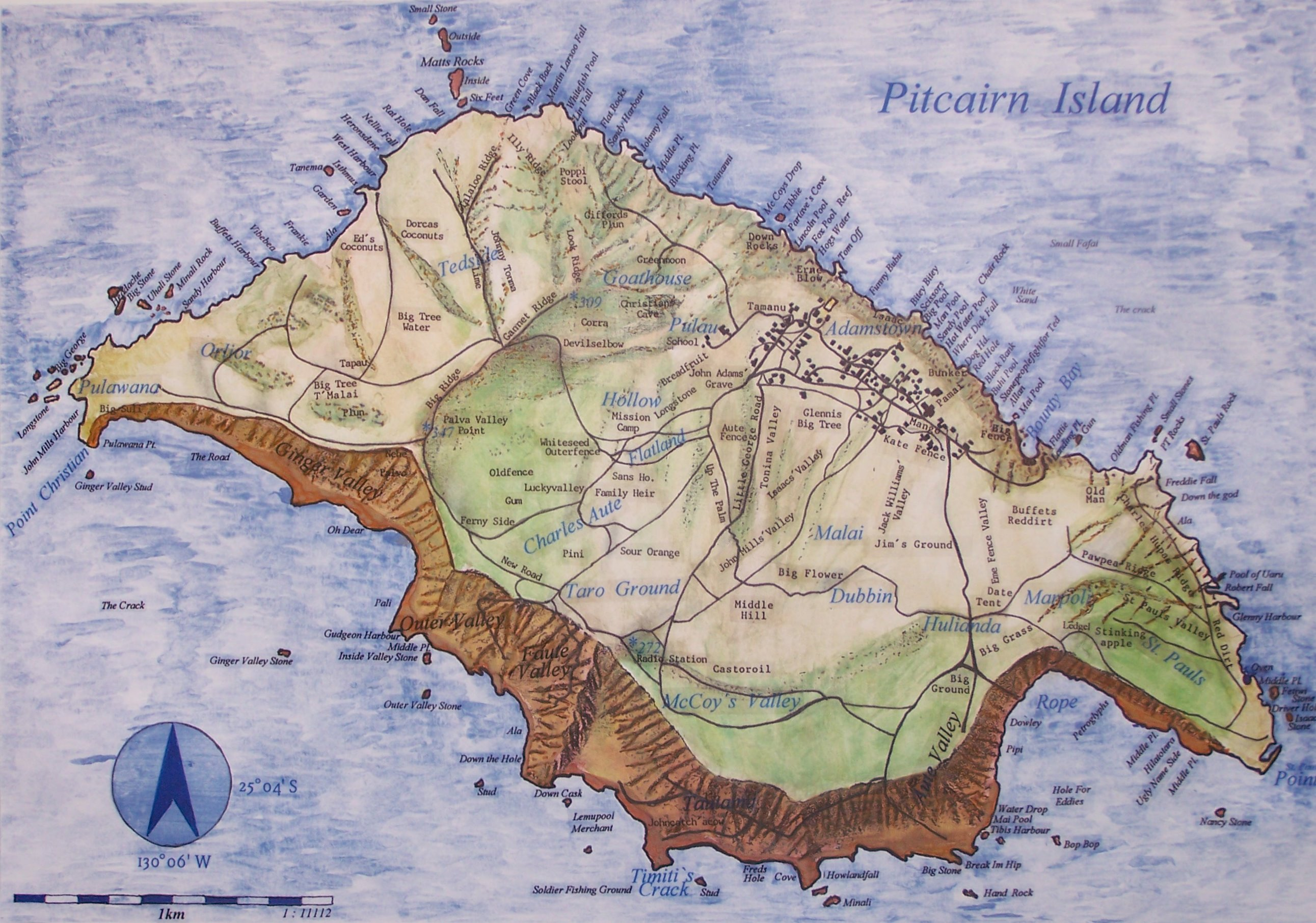
Modern Pitcairn Island map

After leaving Tahiti on 22 September 1789, Christian sailed Bounty west in search of a safe haven. He then formed the idea of settling on Pitcairn Island, far to the east of Tahiti; the island had been reported in 1767, but its exact location was never verified. After months of searching, Christian rediscovered the island on 15 January 1790, 188 nautical miles (348 km; 216 mi) east of its recorded position. This longitudinal error contributed to the mutineers' decision to settle on Pitcairn.

The group consisted of British sailors Fletcher Christian, Ned Young, John Adams, Matthew Quintal, William Brown, Isaac Martin, John Mills and John Williams; William McCoy; six Polynesian men (Manarii/Menalee, Niau/Nehou, and Teirnua/Te Moa from Tahiti; Taroamiva/Tetahiti and Oher/Hu from Tubuai; and Taruro/Talalo/Tullaloo from Raiatea by way of Tahiti) and twelve Tahitian women (Mauatua/Maimiti/Isabella, Teehuteatuaonoa/Jenny, Teraura/Susanah, Teio/Mary, Vahineatua/Bal'hadi/Prudence, Obuarei/Puarai, Tevarua/Sarah, Teatuahitea/Sarah, Faahotu/Fasto, Toofaiti/Hutia/Nancy, Mareva, and Tinafornea) as well as a Tahitian baby girl named Sarah/Sally, daughter of Teio, who would become a respected person in the community.

On arrival, the ship was unloaded and stripped of most of its masts and spars, for use on the island. On 23 January, five days after their arrival, as the seamen discussed whether to burn the ship, Quintal set the ship ablaze and destroyed it, either as an agreed-upon precaution against discovery or as an unauthorised act. There was now no means of escape.

The island proved an ideal haven for the mutineers—uninhabited and virtually inaccessible, with plenty of food, water, and fertile land. For a while, the mutineers and Tahitians existed peaceably. Christian settled down with Isabella; a son, Thursday October Christian, was the first child born on the island, and others followed. Christian's authority as leader gradually diminished, and he became prone to long periods of brooding and introspection.

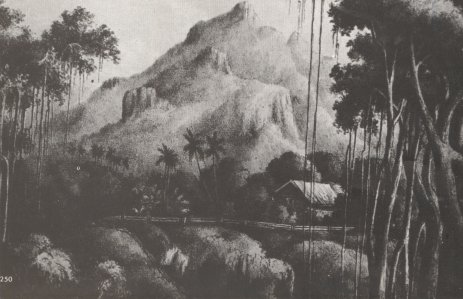
Fletcher Christian's House

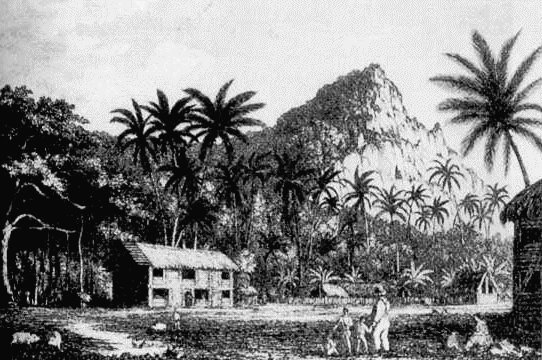
1831 engraving of John Adams Wooden House Pitcairn Island

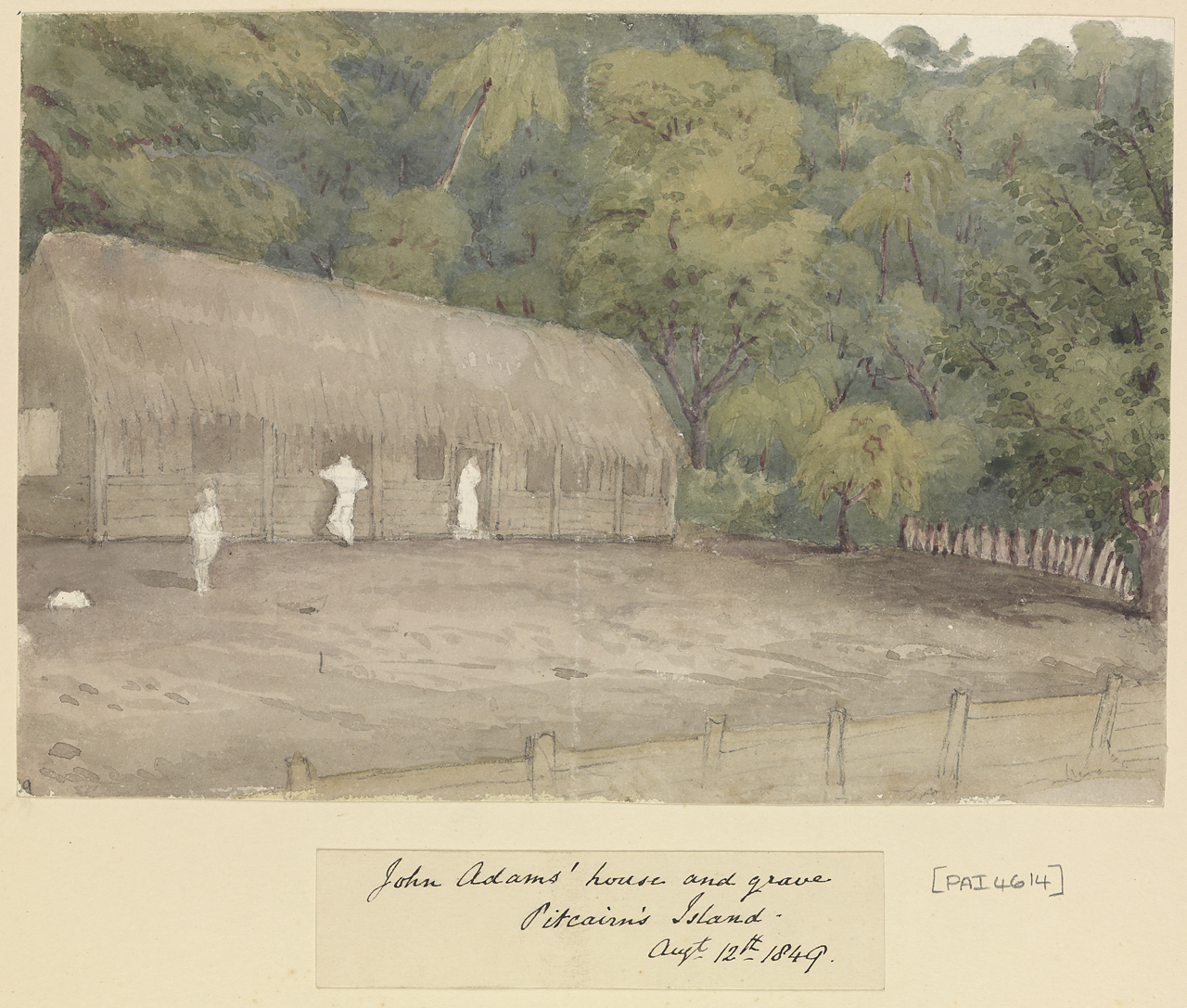
1849 painting of John Adams Wooden House and grave Pitcairn Island

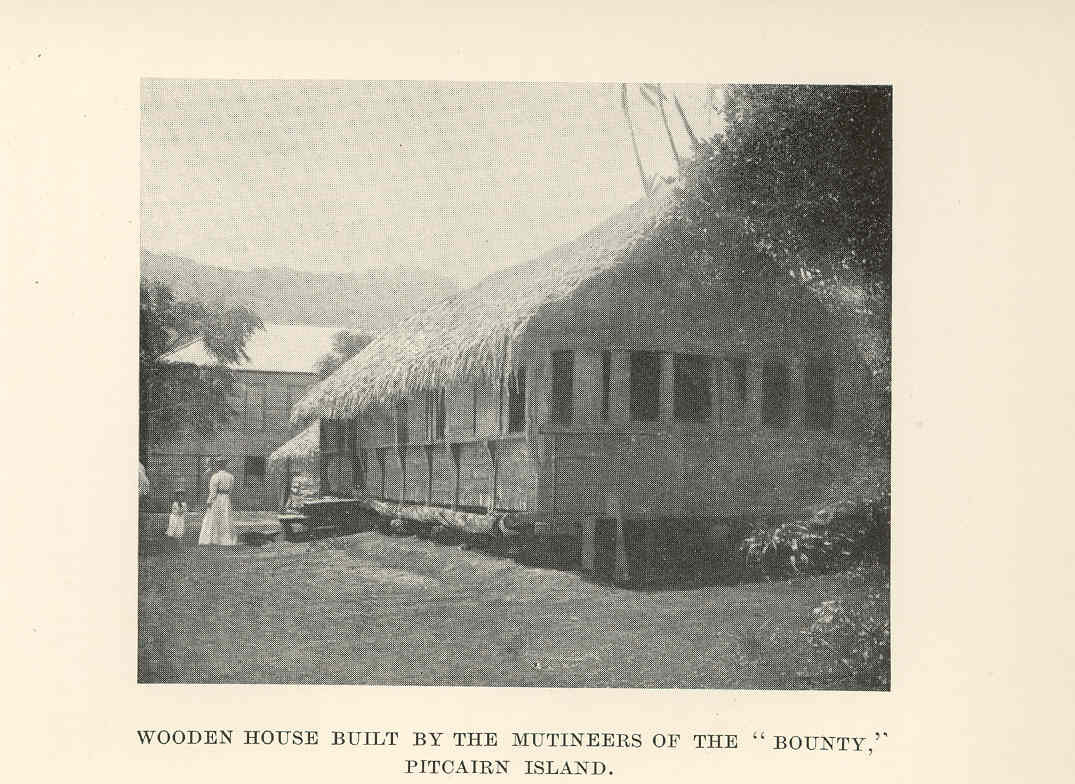
1908 photograph of Wooden House Built by the Mutineers of the 'Bounty,' Pitcairn Island

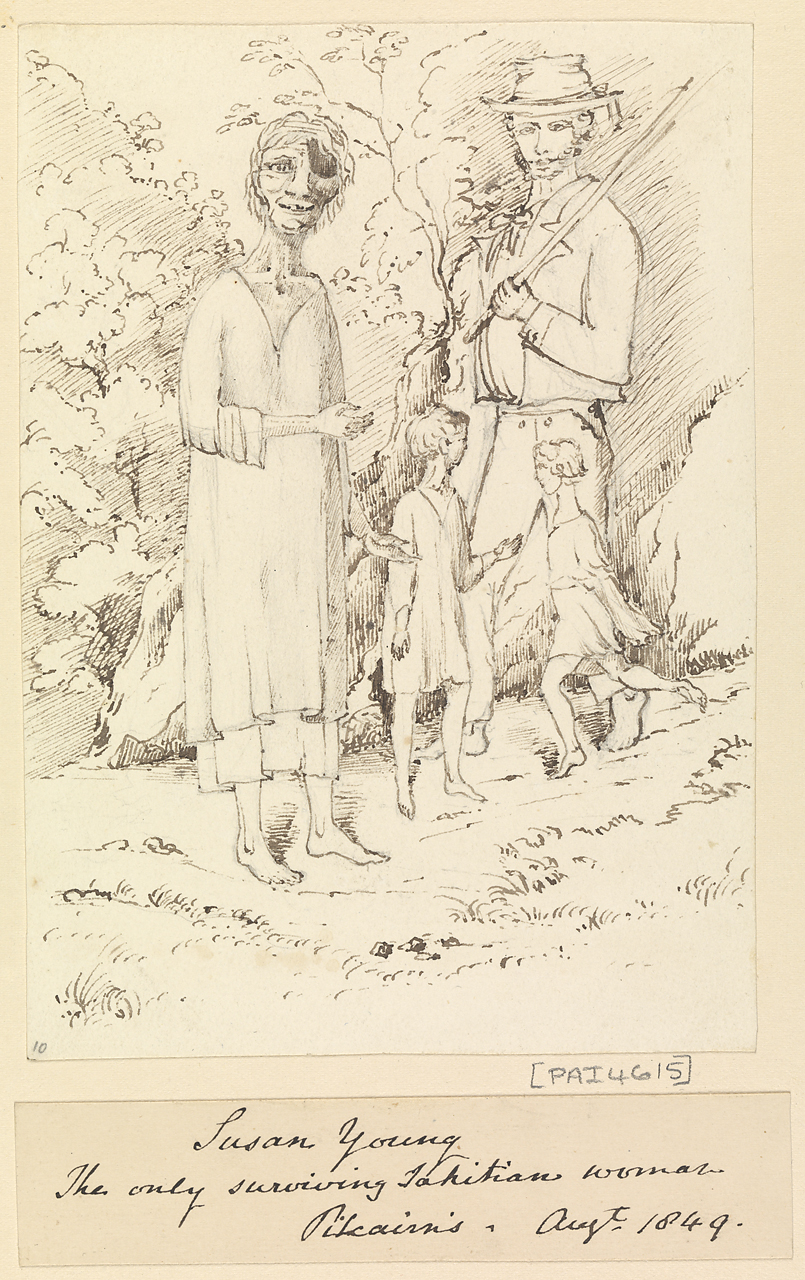
August 1849 Edward Gennys Fanshawe sketch of Susan Young, the only surviving Tahitian woman on Pitcairn's Island

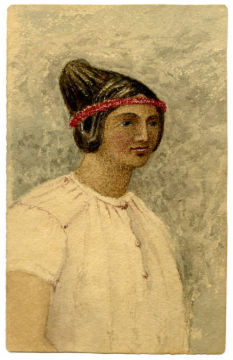
Dorcus Young

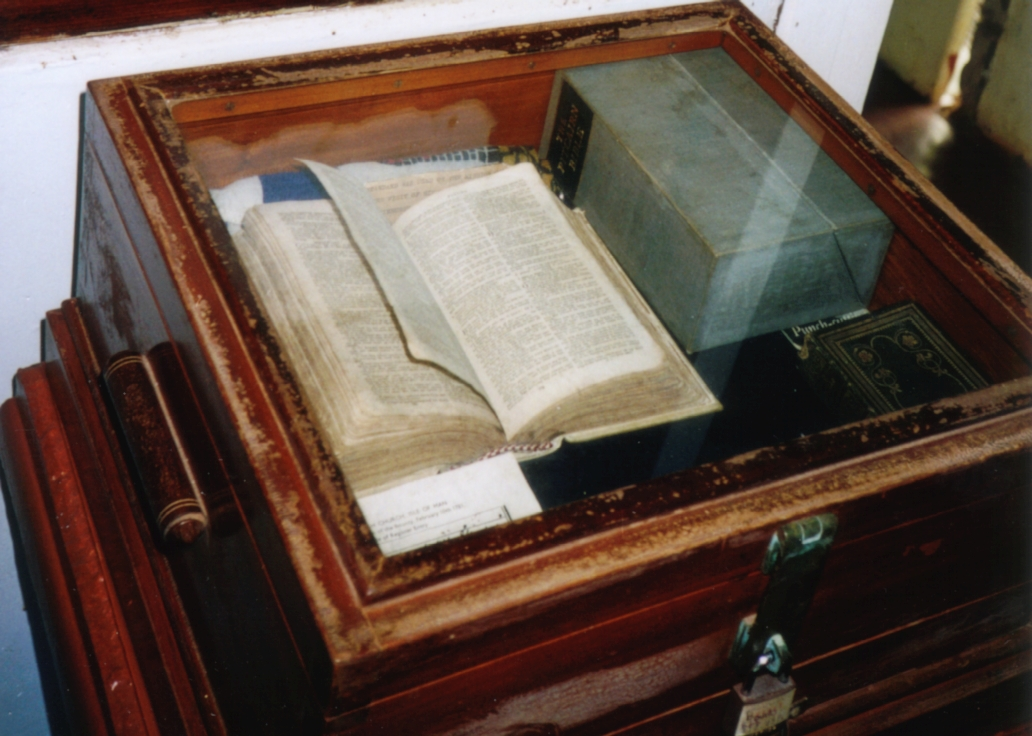
The Bounty Bible

=== Racial tensions ===
Gradually, tensions and rivalries arose over the increasing extent to which the Europeans regarded the Tahitians as their property, in particular the women who, according to Alexander, were "passed around from one 'husband' to the other". The lower-caste Tahitian man, Hu, was often a victim of the white men's beatings and abuse. Martin treated the islanders including his wife with disdain, causing increasing discord. McCoy figured out how to distill brandy from ti-root and built a still. He, Quintal, and some of the women were continually drunk. In 1791, after working side-by-side with the islanders to perform the daily tasks that sustained the colony, some of the seamen decided to loaf in the shade all day while they coerced the Polynesian men to complete the tasks too hard for the women to perform.

Quintal and McCoy required the unmarried man Te Moa to do all their work, and Martin and Mills similarly abused the other lower-caste islander, Nihau. McCoy and Quintal often abused and bullied both the Polynesian women and men. Rosalind Young, a descendant of Ned Young, relayed a story handed down to her that Tevarua went fishing one day but failed to catch enough fish to satisfy Quintal. He punished her by biting off her ear. He may have been drunk at the time, because he and William McCoy were drunk most of the time, consuming McCoy's brandy. Tevarua fell—or, some believe, killed herself, by leaping off a cliff in 1799. The two Tahitian noblemen, Minarii and Tetahiti, still enjoyed lives of relative independence and dignity.

John Williams had sex with Hutia, the wife of Tararu, and the Tahitian leader Minarii attacked him over this insult to Minarii's family. Williams' wife Fasto died soon after, possibly by suicide, after learning of her husband's infidelity. Hu and Tararu plotted to kill the white men in retribution. Hu tried unsuccessfully to kill Martin by pushing him off a cliff. After Fasto died, Williams took Hutia away from Tararu to live with him, and Tararu tried and failed to murder Williams. Hutia decided to poison Tararu in retaliation and unwittingly killed both Tararu and Hu.

McCoy decided to put to a vote a proposal that the arable land be divided among the seamen, excluding the Polynesians. Christian strongly objected. He reminded the Englishmen that on Tahiti, where Minarii and Tetahiti had been chiefs, landless men were deemed outcasts. McCoy's proposal carried by a vote of five to four. When Tetahiti learned of the vote, he went to Minarii to discuss the issue with him, only to find him standing near a pile of smoldering ashes. Quintal had burned the chieftain's new home.

=== Massacre day ===
On 20 September 1793, the four remaining Polynesian men stole muskets and set out to kill all of the Englishmen. Within hours they beheaded Martin and Mills, shot Williams and Brown dead, and fatally wounded Christian in a carefully executed series of murders. Christian was set upon while working in his fields, first shot and then butchered with an axe; his last words, supposedly, were: "Oh, dear!" (Note: This account of Christian's death was based on the account of John Adams, the last surviving mutineer. Adams was sometimes inconsistent in his stories; for example, he also claimed that Christian's death was due to suicide.) Three of the Englishmen's wives took revenge, killing Te Moa and Niuha. Teraura, the wife of Ned Young, beheaded Tetahiti while he slept. Quintal killed Minarii in a violent fight.

=== Adams leads women and children ===
Young and Adams assumed leadership and secured a tenuous calm disrupted by the drunken behaviour of McCoy and Quintal. The two men and some of the women spent their days in an alcoholic stupor. Some of the women attempted to leave the island in a makeshift boat but could not launch it successfully.

On 20 April 1798, McCoy attached a rock to his neck with a rope and leapt over a cliff to his death. Quintal became increasingly erratic. He demanded to take Isabella, Fletcher Christian's widow, as his wife, and threatened to kill Christian's children if his demands were not granted. Ned Young and John Adams invited him to Young's home. There they overpowered him, and killed him with an axe.

Young and Adams became interested in Christianity, and Young taught Adams to read using the Bounty's Bible. Young died of an asthma attack in 1800. Adams lived until 1829.

=== Contact reestablished ===
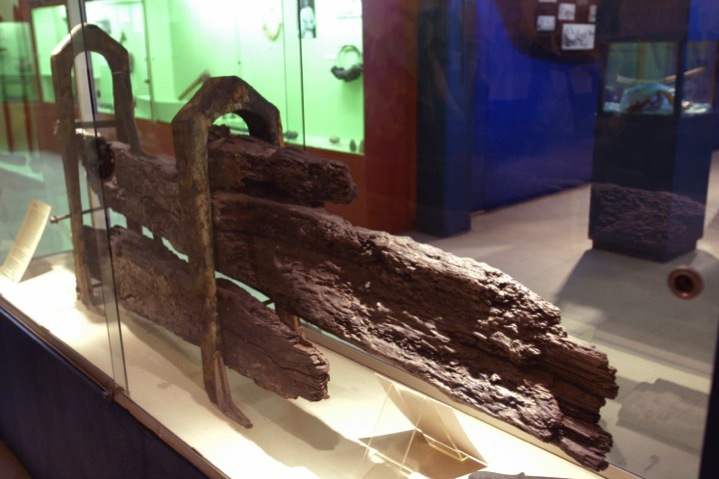
Parts of Bounty's rudder, recovered from Pitcairn Island and preserved in Fiji Museum

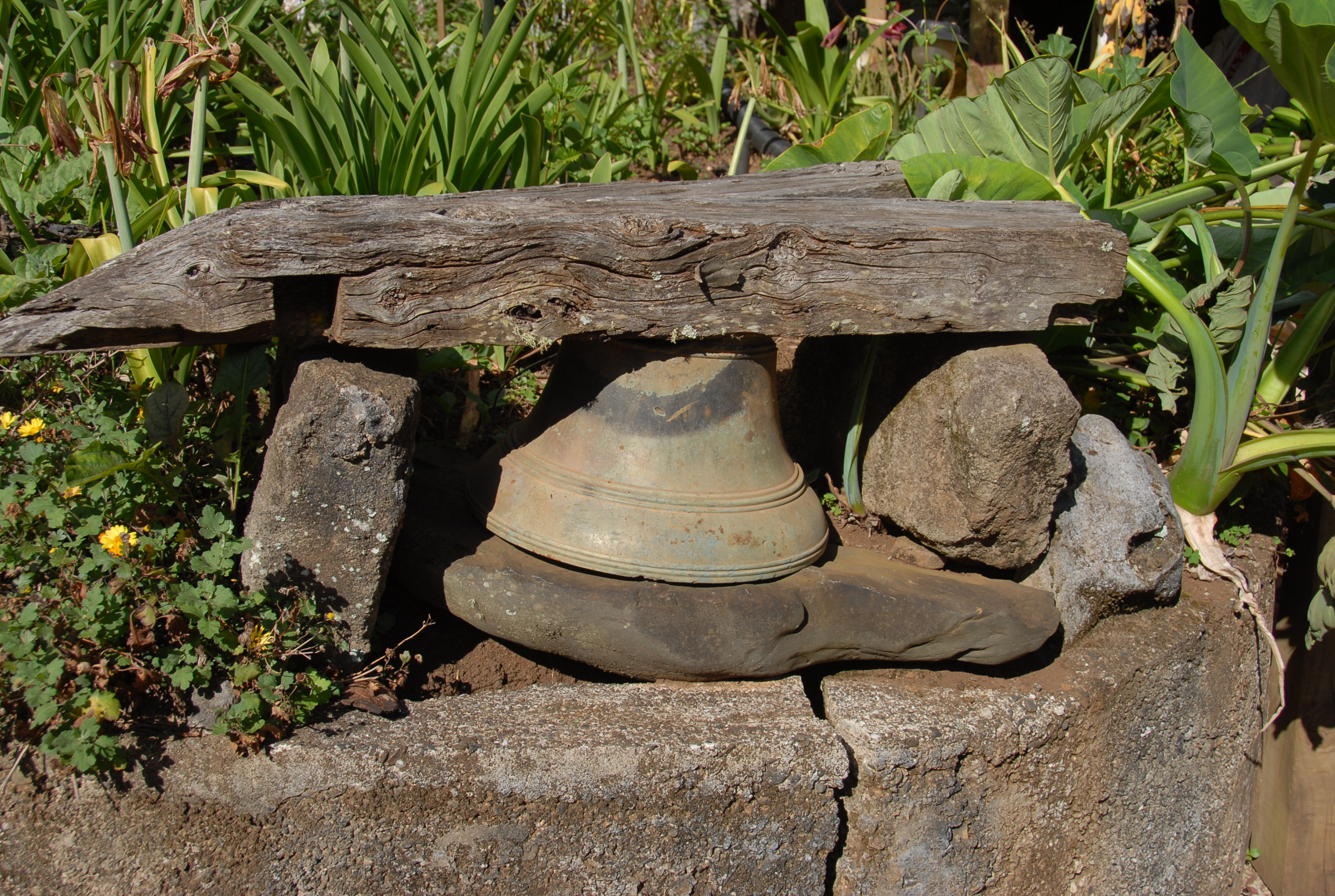
HMAS Bounty bell

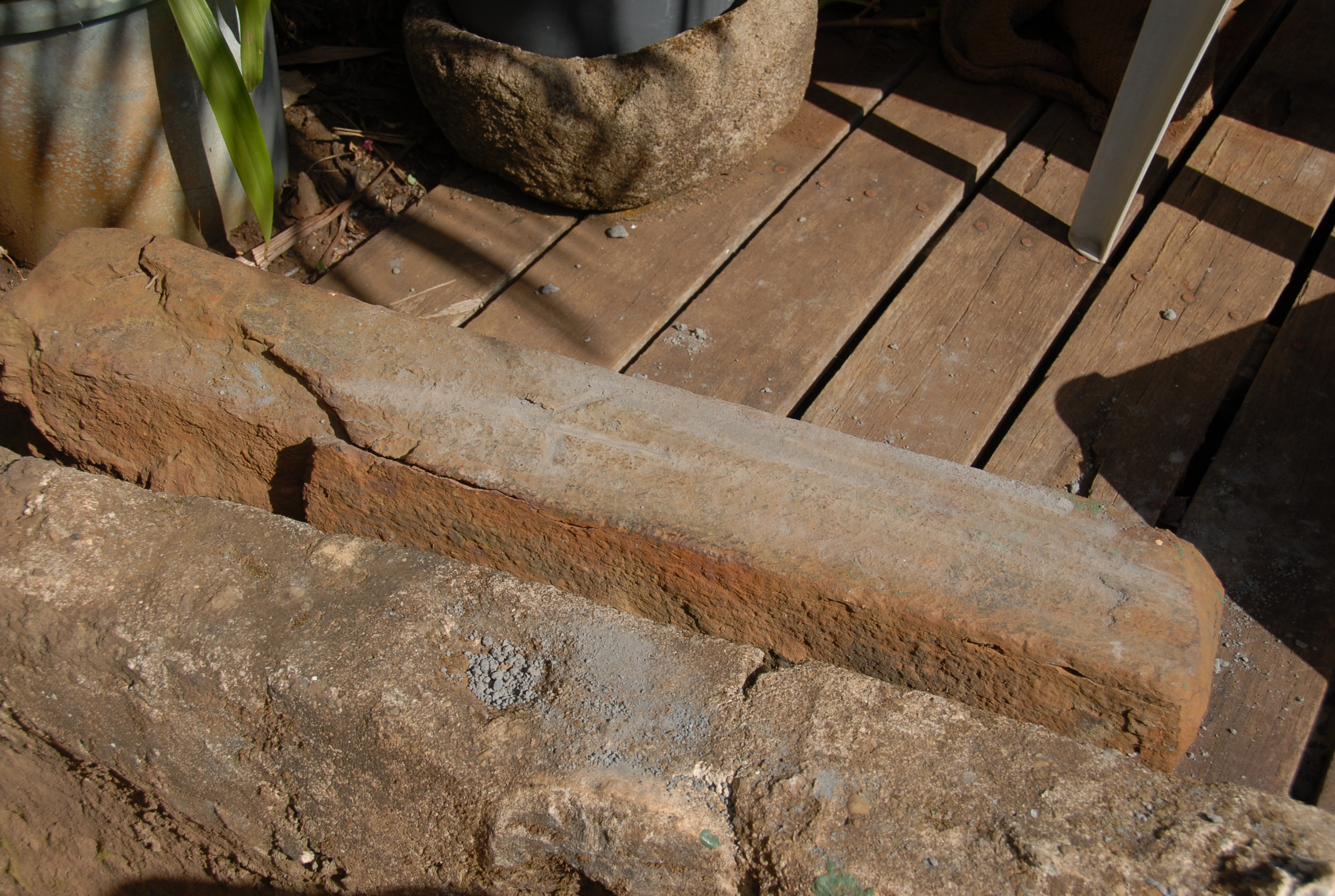
HMAS Bounty ballast bar

After Young succumbed to asthma in 1800, Adams took responsibility for the education and well-being of the nine remaining women and 19 children. Using the ship's Bible from Bounty, he taught literacy and Christianity, and kept peace on the island. This was the situation in February 1808, when the American sealer Topaz commanded by Mayhew Folger came unexpectedly upon Pitcairn, landed, and discovered the, by then, thriving community. News of Topaz's discovery did not reach Britain until 1810, when it was overlooked by an Admiralty preoccupied by war with France.

In 1814, two British warships, HMS Briton and HMS Tagus, chanced upon Pitcairn. Among those who greeted them were Thursday October Christian and George Young (Edward Young's son). The captains, Sir Thomas Staines and Philip Pipon, reported that Christian's son displayed "in his benevolent countenance, all the features of an honest English face". On shore they found a population of 46 mainly young islanders led by Adams, upon whom the islanders' welfare was wholly dependent, according to the captains' report. After receiving Staines's and Pipon's report, the Admiralty decided to take no action.

Henderson Island was rediscovered on 17 January 1819 by British Captain James Henderson of the British East India Company ship Hercules. Captain Henry King, sailing on Elizabeth, landed on 2 March to find the king's colours already flying. His crew scratched the name of their ship into a tree. Oeno Island was discovered on 26 January 1824 by American captain George Worth aboard the whaler Oeno.

In 1832, a Church Missionary Society missionary arrived. He reported that by March 1833, he had founded a Temperance Society to combat drunkenness, a "Maundy Thursday Society", a monthly prayer meeting, a juvenile society, a Peace Society, and a school.

In the following years, many ships called at Pitcairn Island and heard Adams's various stories of the foundation of the Pitcairn settlement. Adams died in 1829, honoured as the founder and father of a community that became celebrated over the next century as an exemplar of Victorian morality. Over the years, many recovered Bounty artefacts have been sold by islanders as souvenirs; in 1999, the Pitcairn Project was established by a consortium of Australian academic and historical bodies, to survey and document all the material remaining on-site, as part of a detailed study of the settlement's development.

The Pitcairners were visited often by ships. During the 1820s, three British adventurers named John Buffett, John Evans and George Nobbs settled on the island and married children of the mutineers. Following Adams's death in 1829, a power vacuum emerged. Nobbs, a veteran of the British and Chilean navies, was Adams's chosen successor, but Buffett and Thursday October Christian, the son of Fletcher and the first child born on the island, who had the task of greeting visiting ships, were also important leaders during this time.

=== Resettlement ===
Fearing overcrowding, the islanders requested the British government transport them to Tahiti. In 1831 the British government relocated the islanders there. But they found it unlike the home they remembered, full of "immorality, saloons, vile dances, gambling, and scarlet women." The descendants could not adapt to the changes in Tahiti, and a dozen people, including Thursday October Christian, had died of disease. The islanders were now even more leaderless, as alcoholism became a problem. They returned to Pitcairn after six months, aboard the ship of William Driver.

=== New settlers ===
In 1832, an adventurer named Joshua Hill, claiming to be an agent of Britain, arrived on the island and was elected leader, styling himself President of the Commonwealth of Pitcairn. He ordered Buffett, Evans and Nobbs to be exiled, banned alcohol and ordered imprisonments for the slightest infractions. He was eventually driven off the island in 1838. The islanders set up a system whereby they would elect a chief magistrate every year as the leader of the island.

Other important positions on the island were those of schoolmaster, doctor and pastor. Nobbs, however, was the effective leader of the island. Under this law code, Pitcairn became the first British colony in the Pacific and also the second territory in the world, after Corsica under Pasquale Paoli in 1755, to give women the right to vote.

On 29 November 1838, HMS Fly arrived in Pitcairn, captained by Russell Elliott of the Royal Navy. The islanders petitioned Elliott for the island to be placed under British protection and for assistance in drafting a new legal code. Elliott gave the islanders a Union Jack, although he had no authority to proclaim a formal British protectorate. Pitcairn Islanders have traditionally regarded this as "the moment that Pitcairn Island became part of the British Empire", but the British government did not legally consider Pitcairn to have become a British possession until 1898, when it was deemed to fall under the British Settlements Act 1887.

=== Move to Norfolk Island ===
By the mid-1850s the Pitcairn community was outgrowing the island and they appealed to Queen Victoria for help. Queen Victoria offered them Norfolk Island. In 1856, all 163 residents boarded Morayshire and crossed the Pacific to Norfolk Island, formerly a prison colony, an isolated rock between the North Island of New Zealand and New Caledonia. They arrived on 8 June after a miserable five-week trip. Eighteen months later, sixteen returned, and they were followed by 27 others in 1864.

In 1858, while the island was uninhabited, survivors of the shipwreck of the clipper Wild Wave spent several months there until rescued by USS Vandalia. These visitors had dismantled some houses for wood and nails and had vandalised John Adams' grave. The island was also nearly annexed by France, whose government did not realise that the island had just been inhabited. George Nobbs and John Buffett stayed on Norfolk Island. By this time, an American family named Warren settled on Pitcairn Island.

During the 1860s further immigration to the island was banned. In 1886 the Seventh-day Adventist layman John Tay visited Pitcairn and persuaded most of the islanders to convert from the Church of England to his faith. He returned in 1890 on the missionary schooner Pitcairn with an ordained minister to perform baptisms. Since then, the majority of Pitcairn Islanders have been Adventists.

Important leaders of Pitcairn during this time were Thursday October Christian II, Simon Young and James Russell McCoy. McCoy, who was sent to England for education as a child, spent much of his later life on missionary journeys. In 1887, Britain officially annexed the island, and it was officially put under the jurisdiction of the governors of Fiji.

=== Late 19th century ===
HMS Thetis visited Pitcairn Island on 18 April 1881 and "found the people very happy and contented, and in perfect health". At that time the population was 96, an increase of six since the visit of Admiral de Horsey in September 1878. Stores had recently been delivered from friends in England, including two whale-boats and Portland cement, which was used to make the reservoir watertight. HMS Thetis gave the islanders 200 lb (91 kg) of biscuits, 100 lb (45 kg) of candles, and 100 lb of soap and clothing to the value of £31, donated by the ship's company. An American trading ship called Venus had recently bestowed a supply of cotton seed, to provide the islanders with a crop for future trade.

One crime of note during this time was that of a double murder committed in June 1897, and which concerned Harry Albert Christian, great-grandson of Fletcher Christian. Christian admitted having murdered, for jealous reasons, one of the island women, Julia Warren and her child, the bodies of which he subsequently threw into the sea. The bodies of the victims were never found.

A commission was brought to Pitcairn onboard HMS Royalist in order for Christian to undergo trial for murder. Having been found guilty Christian was sentenced to death and detained, under effective house arrest, until he was put onboard HMS Royalist and transferred to Suva, Fiji. Christian was hanged at Suva Gaol on October 8, 1898.

=== 20th century ===
The islands of Henderson, Oeno and Ducie were annexed by Britain in 1902: Henderson on 1 July, Oeno on 10 July, and Ducie on 19 December. The population peaked at 233 in 1937. It has since decreased owing to emigration, primarily to Australia and New Zealand. In 1938, the three islands, along with Pitcairn, were incorporated into a single administrative unit called the Pitcairn Group of Islands. By the 1930s and 1940s, diminished shipping and tourism to the island resulted in the residents selling many of the pre-European cultural items and Bounty-related paraphernalia to private individuals for income. In 1940 and 1941, the British government sent Henry Evans Maude and his wife Honor Maude to the islands to modernise the government, and to establish a post office and issue stamps in order to generate revenue for the people.

== Current society ==
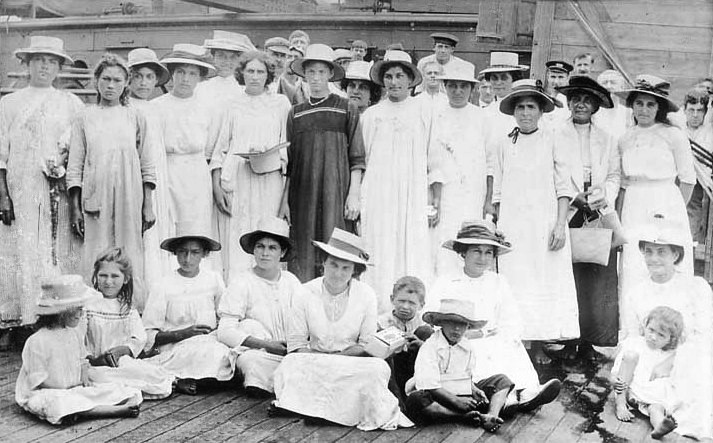
Pitcairn Islanders, 1916

During the 20th century, most of the chief magistrates have been from the Christian and Young families, and contact with the outside world continued to increase. In 1970 the British high commissioners of New Zealand became the governors of Pitcairn. The current governor as of 2026 is Louise Cantillon. In 1999 the position of chief magistrate was replaced by the position of mayor. Another change for the community is the decline of the Adventist church, where there are now only eight regular worshippers.

Since the population peaked at 233 in 1937, the island has suffered from emigration, primarily to New Zealand, leaving as of 2021 current population of 47. The islands rely heavily on tourism and landing fees as their main source of income as well as shipments from New Zealand.

=== Sex crimes convictions ===
On 30 September 2004, seven male residents of Pitcairn, about one-third of the male population, and six others living abroad, were tried on 55 sex-related offences. Among the accused was Steve Christian, Pitcairn's Mayor, who faced several charges of rape, indecent assault, and child abuse. On 25 October 2004, six men were convicted, including Steve Christian. A seventh, the island's former Magistrate Jay Warren, was acquitted. In 2004, the islanders surrendered about 20 firearms ahead of the sexual assault trials.

After the six men lost their final appeal, the British government set up a prison on the island at Bob's Valley. The men began serving their sentences in late 2006. By 2010, all had served their sentences or been granted home detention status.

In 2010, mayor Mike Warren was charged with 25 counts of possessing child pornography on his computer. In 2016, Warren was found guilty of downloading more than 1,000 images and videos of child sexual abuse. Warren began downloading the images some time after the 2004 sexual assault convictions. During the time he downloaded the images, he was working in child protection. Warren was also convicted of engaging in a "sex chat" with someone he believed was a 15-year-old girl.

=== First female Mayor ===
Charlene Warren-Peu (born 9 June 1979) was elected in 2019 as Mayor of the Pitcairn Islands. She is the first woman to hold the position on a permanent basis. She previously served as Deputy Mayor and was on the Island Council.

== Bibliography ==
- "History of Pitcairn Island". Pitcairn Islands Study Center. Pacific Union College. 2000. "Used by permission from the government-published Guide to Pitcairn,"
- Alexander, Caroline (2003). The Bounty. London: Harper Collins. ISBN 978-0-00-257221-7.
- Barrow, Sir John (1831). The Eventful History of the Mutiny and Piratical Seizure of HMS Bounty: Its Causes and Consequences. London: John Murray. OCLC 4050135.
- Erskine, Nigel (1999). "Reclaiming the Bounty". Archaeology. 52 (3). Boston: Archaeological Institute of America.
- Guttridge, Leonard F (2006) [1992]. Mutiny: A History of Naval Insurrection. Annapolis, Maryland: Naval Institute Press. ISBN 978-1-59114-348-2.
- Hough, Richard (1972). Captain Bligh and Mr Christian: The Men and the Mutiny. London: Hutchinsons. ISBN 978-0-09-112860-9.
- Nechtman, Tillman (2018). The Pretender of Pitcairn Island: Joshua W. Hill – The Man Who Would Be King Among the Bounty Mutineers. Cambridge, UK: Cambridge University Press. ISBN 978-1-108-44080-6.
- Stanley, David (2004). South Pacific (Eighth ed.). Chico, California: Moon Handbooks. ISBN 978-1-56691-411-6.
