= Pauline Thompson =

New Zealand painter

- Born: Pauline Thompson; 1942; Auckland, New Zealand
- Died: 27 July 2012 (aged 69); North Shore, New Zealand
- Known for: Painting
- Notable work: Suzanne Aubert at the Mirror
- Movement: Realist

Pauline Adele Thompson (28 November 1942 – 27 July 2012) was a New Zealand painter. Her style can be described as romantic-realist. She exhibited with the Auckland Society of Arts and in the New Women Artists exhibition at the Govett-Brewster Art Gallery in 1984.

Thompson was born in 1942, the daughter of Walter Kirkpatrick Thompson and Marie Gabrielle Buffett. She died on Auckland's North Shore on 27 July 2012.

== Early life and family ==
Pauline Adele Thompson was born on the 28 November 1942 in Auckland, New Zealand. Her father, Walter Kirkpatrick Thompson, was a builder, and her mother, Marie Gabrielle Buffett, was a piano teacher. She had an older sibling. Thompson was born with haemolytic disease of the newborn, and her life was saved with a full blood transfusion immediately after birth. Later, a younger brother with the same condition would die shortly after birth. She had joint Pākehā and Tahitian ancestry. Thompson showed interest in painting from a young age.

== Education ==
From 1956 to 1960, Thompson took a commercial course at Seddon Memorial Technical College and art classes at Auckland City Art Gallery. Her first public exhibition took place in 1959, when she was sixteen. In 1960, she worked as an illustrator for the New Zealand Herald while studying part-time at Elam School of Fine Arts. She studied full-time at Elam in 1963 and 1964, where she was tutored by Colin McCahon and Garth Tapper. She left Elam without finishing her degree out of protest after McCahon told her that she would never be a true artist because motherhood would distract her.

== Career ==
Thompson kept her last name after marrying fellow artist Ross William Ritchie in 1965. She and Ritchie had three children. After marriage, Thompson worked briefly as a cleaner, an illustrator and as a community art teacher, mostly focusing her time on parenting and art.

In a 1965 exhibition Thompson presented a series of large, mostly abstract paintings, wanting to create "environmental art which confronts [the audience]". Also in the 1960s, Thompson produced a series drawing inspiration from pop art and Piet Mondrian. Late in the decade she began her "Cycle" series, featuring symbolic paintings centred on stylised palm trees. In 1967, she featured in Auckland City Art Gallery's Ten Years of New Zealand Painting exhibition, and in 1969 she was mentioned in Gordon Brown and Hamish Keith’s An introduction to New Zealand painting 1839–1967.

Thompson's work in the 1970s centred on sexual themes, her experiences of parenthood and her involvement with Sufism. Between 1976 and 1979, her work was hindered by the deaths of her parents and sister. From the late 70s, Thompson incorporated urban landscapes and historical features into her paintings. Her "Plains and Volcanoes" series, exhibited in the early 1980s, juxtaposed realist landscapes with dream-like environments. Her 1987 series "Judgement" was inspired by a radio play by Barry Collins of the same name. "Judgement II" exhibited two years later. Both series explored themes of death and resurrection.

The mutiny of the Bounty - a historical event Thompson had ancestral connection to - and the subsequent lives of the mutineers and accompanying Tahitians heavily inspired Thompson's later works. Norfolk Island and Pitcairn Island frequently feature in these works. She produced large paintings and made use of iconography and spiritual symbols. Thompson's 1997 series, "Tuki and Huru", followed the story of two young Māori men kidnapped in the 1790s to teach flax weaving to convicts on Norfolk Island.

Thompson died on the 27 July 2012, aged 69.

== Identity as a woman artist ==
Thompson struggled with being a woman in the male-dominated world of art for all of her life. She was concerned that New Zealand women artists were neglected by art history, and so deliberately put details about her life into exhibition catalogues and interviews to ensure her experience as a woman artist in New Zealand was recorded. She noted that critics often discussed her work in relation to her domestic life, which they didn't do for her male peers. In 1988, she remarked, "I don’t think art has any sex. I think the spirit is sexless." She went on to say that although art has no gender, an artist's experience is very gendered.

== Notable works ==
Pauline Thompson's works include 'Suzanne Aubert at the Mirror'. She created a series of painting based on her ancestor, Mauatua, and other Pitcairn Islanders.
