= Mauatua =

Tahitian tapa weaver (c.1764–1841)

- Born: c. 1764; Tahiti
- Died: 19 September 1841 (aged 76–77); Pitcairn Islands
- Occupation: Tapa maker

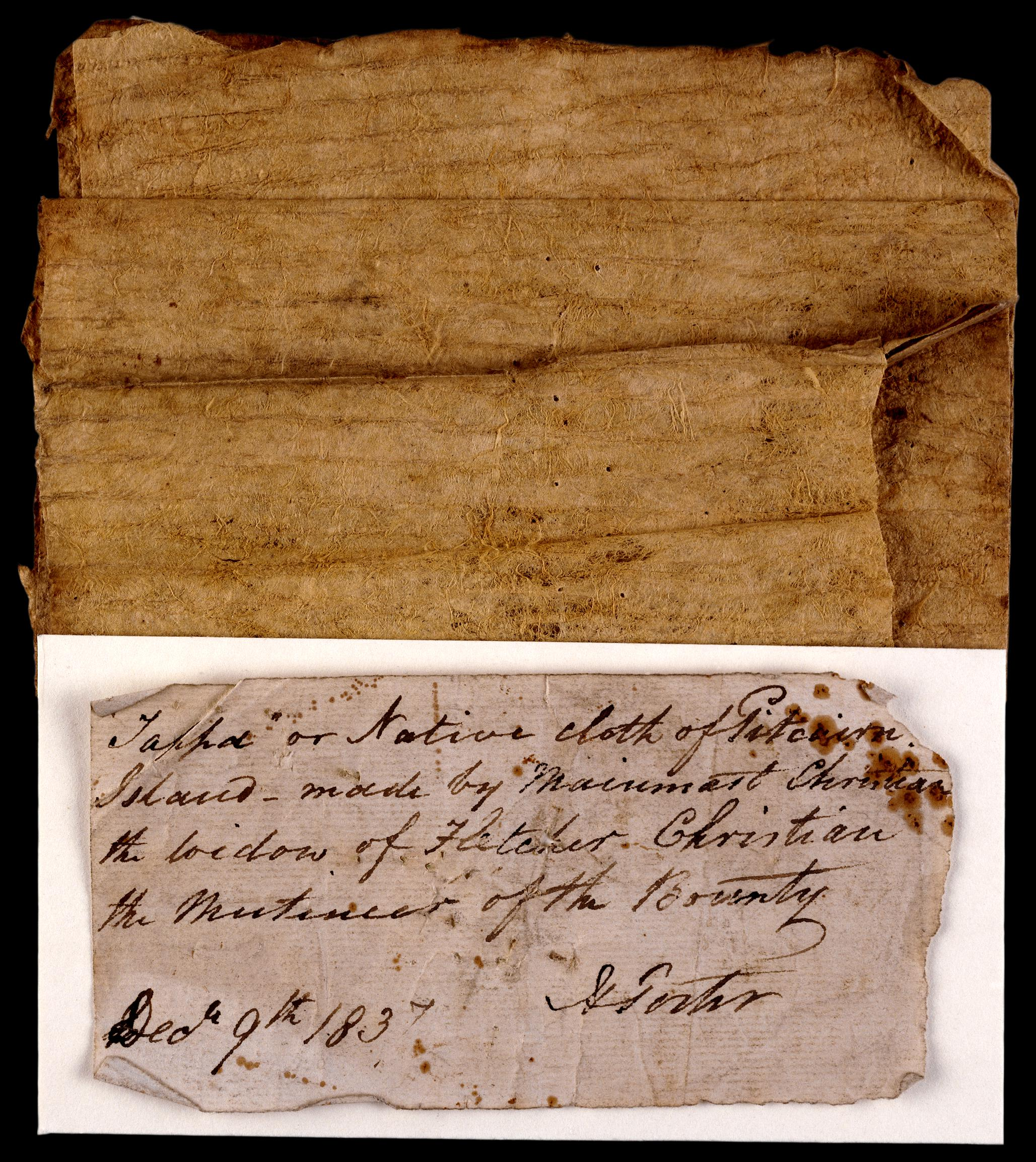
Tapa cloth made by Mauatua

Mauatua, also Maimiti or Isabella Christian, also known as Mainmast, (c. 1764 – 19 September 1841) was a Tahitian tapa maker, who settled on Pitcairn Island with the Bounty mutineers. She married first to Fletcher Christian, and then to Ned Young, and had children with both men. Fine white tapa, which was her specialty, is held in the collections of the British Museum and the Pitt Rivers Museum, amongst others.

== Biography ==
While the date of Mauatua's birth is not historically recorded, in later life she claimed to have witnessed the arrival of James Cook in Tahiti in 1769. This information, combined with an estimate that she was 23 or 24 years old in 1788 when HMS Bounty arrived, suggests that she was born circa 1764. She was reputedly the daughter of a chief, or at least was born in a high social group. The suffix -atua means 'for god/gods' and indicates a position within nobility.

Fletcher Christian, Mauatua's partner

Mauatua left Tahiti with Fletcher Christian and the mutineers; before they reached Pitcairn Island, they attempted to begin a new settlement at Tubuai. She was the oldest woman to travel with the mutineers, and became a matriarch of the new society that was ultimately founded by them on Pitcairn Island. She married Fletcher Christian, and they had two sons and a daughter. Their sons were Thursday October and Charles Christian; their daughter was called Mary Anne and she was born after her father was murdered on 20 September 1793. After Christian's death, Mauatua became the partner of Edward Young, with whom she had three children: Edward, Polly, and Dorothea.

Along with the other Polynesian women, Mauatua brought the practice of beating tapa cloth to Pitcairn. They adapted the process to reflect the natural materials they had access to. During her lifetime, she gave tapa that she had made as gifts, including a bale of the cloth to Frances Heywood, wife of naval officer and mutineer, Peter Heywood. From surviving examples and contemporary observations, it appears that Mauatua specialised in making a fine white tapa.

In 1831, Mauatua was part of the group who returned to Tahiti, landing there, according to historian Henry Maude, on 23 March 1831. Many of the group were killed by infectious diseases they had no immunity to. This included her son Thursday October. She returned to Pitcairn Island the same year. According to her descendant, Glyn Christian, Mauatua was instrumental in having the right to vote for women on Pitcairn made into law in 1838.

Mauatua died on 19 September 1841 after catching influenza. After her death, Teraura remained as the only survivor of the original settlers and the island's oldest inhabitant.

== Legacy ==
Many of the families living on Pitcairn Island and Norfolk Island can trace their ancestry back to Mauatua.

Three examples of tapa cloth made by Mauatua are held in the collections of the British Museum and at Kew Gardens in London. Examples made by her daughters Polly and Dorothea (Dolly) are found in collections of the Turnbull Library in New Zealand and the Pitt Rivers Museum in Oxford, respectively. Cloth made by her great-granddaughter, Helena Beatrice Young, is also held at both the British Museum and the Pitt Rivers Museum.

Mauatua's craft as a tapa beater inspires the work of her descendant Jean Clarkson, whose work is held in the collection of Te Papa.

=== In popular culture ===
Mauatua is portrayed by:

- Mamo Clark (1935) Mutiny on the Bounty
- Tarita Teriipaia (1962) Mutiny on the Bounty
- Tevaite Vernette (1984) The Bounty In this film, the romance between her and Christian is portrayed as a cause of the mutiny.

Mauatua is the subject of several books, including a biography of her and Fletcher Christian by her great-great-great-great-grandson Glyn Christian. He also wrote a work of historical fiction based on her life. A novelisation of her life, and that of the other Polynesian women to live on Pitcairn, entitled Transit of Venus, was written by another descendant, Rowan Metcalfe, and published posthumously.

The artist Pauline Thompson, who was also a descendant, created several paintings inspired by Mauatua's life and those of other Pitcairn Islander women.

== See also ==
- Teraura
- Teio
