= The Long Voyage =

Short story by Charles Dickens

- Short story by Charles Dickens
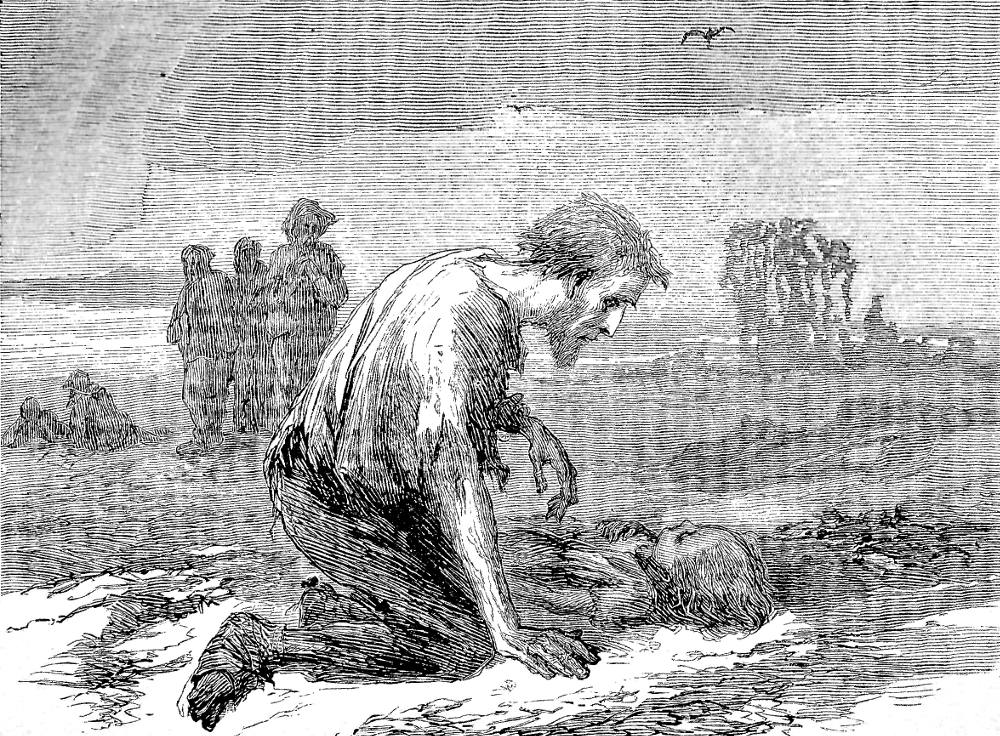
- Illustration by Sol Eytinge Jr.

Text available at Wikisource
- Country: United Kingdom
- Language: English

Publication
- Published in: Household Words
- Publication date: 31 December 1853

"The Long Voyage" is a New Year's Eve short story by Charles Dickens. It was originally published in volume 8, number 197 of Household Words magazine on 31 December 1853.

== Plot summary ==
The story concerns a man alone on New Year's Eve, who loves to "sit by the fire, thinking of what I have read in books of voyage and travel" while he himself has never been "around the world, never has been shipwrecked, ice-environed, tomahawked, or eaten."

Some of the books he has read concern Christopher Columbus, James Bruce who searched for the source of the Nile, John Franklin who made an "unhappy overland Journey" and was lost searching for the northwest passage in the Canadian Arctic, "Men-selling despots" and the Atlantic slave trade, and Mungo Park, a Scottish explorer (1771–1806) who wrote Travels in the Interior of Africa and other adventure stories. He also touches on "one awful creature" by the name of Alexander Pearce who escaped from a penal colony on an island and cannibalized his fellow escapees. He then tells the story of the Mutiny on the Bounty, and of Thursday October Christian, the son of Fletcher Christian who mutinied against Captain Bligh, leaving Bligh to fend for himself on the open sea.

He then reads about the sad fate of the Halsewell, lost in a shipwreck on rocks off the Isle of Purbeck in which 160 people died. Captain Pierce stayed to comfort his daughters, even though he could have saved himself. Finally, he recounts the exciting story of the Grosvenor, an English-bound Mercantile ship that ran aground on 4 August 1782 in South Africa. Of the 125 who made it to shore, only 13 survived the trip back to civilization.

After meditating on these stories he comes to a startling realization about The Long Voyage, looking into the fire on that first of January 1853.
