= Teraura =

Tapa weaver and Pitcairn Island settler

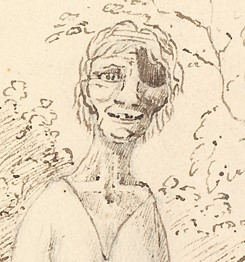
- Detail of Fanshawe's 1849 drawing of Teraura
- Born: c. 1775; Moorea
- Died: July 1850 (aged 74–75); Pitcairn Island
- Other names: Susan Young; Susannah Young
- Partners: Ned Young; Matthew Quintal; Thursday October Christian I

Teraura, also Susan or Susannah Young (c. 1775 – July 1850), was a Tahitian woman who settled on Pitcairn Island with the Bounty Mutineers. She took part in Ned Young's plot to murder male Polynesians who had travelled on HMS Bounty and killed Tetahiti. A tapa maker, examples of her craft are found in the British Museum and at Kew Gardens.

== Biography ==
Whilst little is known about Teraura's early life, it is likely that she was born on Moorea, an island in French Polynesia. Tradition on Pitcairn states that she was from a chiefly family. It is possible that she was born c. 1775, since she was reportedly 15 years old when she left Tahiti with Fletcher Christian and his crew in 1789. It is unknown whether she was kidnapped or went with them of her own volition. The journey lasted several weeks, and according to Teraura they passed the island of Tanna. During the journey, she and Ned Young became sexual partners, a relationship that continued once the group landed on Pitcairn Island on 15 January 1790. Teraura also had an affair with Matthew Quintal, another mutineer, and had a son, Edward Quintal, who became the island's first magistrate.

Racial tensions between the Polynesian and European settlers came to a head in 1793, leading to successive murders on the island. On 20 September 1793, the four remaining Polynesian men beheaded mutineers Isaac Martin and John Mills, shot John Williams and William Brown dead, and fatally wounded Fletcher Christian in a carefully executed series of murders. Teraura, acting on the orders of Ned Young, beheaded the Polynesian Tetahiti. According to the account recorded by Edward Gennys Fanshawe in 1849, Tetahiti was seduced by one of the other Tahitian women, so that Teraura could execute him, and at the same moment shout a warning to Young enabling him to kill the other Polynesian man.

After the death of Young in 1800, Teraura married Thursday October Christian I, the son of Fletcher Christian - he was at least fifteen years her junior at the time of their marriage. They had six children, whose descendants live on the island today. In 1831, Christian and Teraura relocated to Tahiti; however, Christian and three of her children died as a result of an infectious disease contracted there. Teraura returned to Pitcairn.

Teraura was also a tapa maker, and there is a record of her giving a piece of coloured cloth to a sailor in 1833. It is likely this cloth was dyed with the candlenut, giving it a reddish-brown colour. Fragments of tapa beaten by Teraura and by Mauatua are held in the collections of the British Museum and at Kew Gardens.

In 1849, during Fanshawe's visit to Pitcairn, he drew a pen-and-ink sketch of Teraura, where she is wearing an eye patch. The sketch is held in the collection of the National Maritime Museum. She died in July 1850, the last of the original settlers.

== Legacy ==
According to historian Pauline Reynolds, Teraura and the other women who joined HMS Bounty were "probably the most travelled Polynesian women of their day".

== Gallery ==
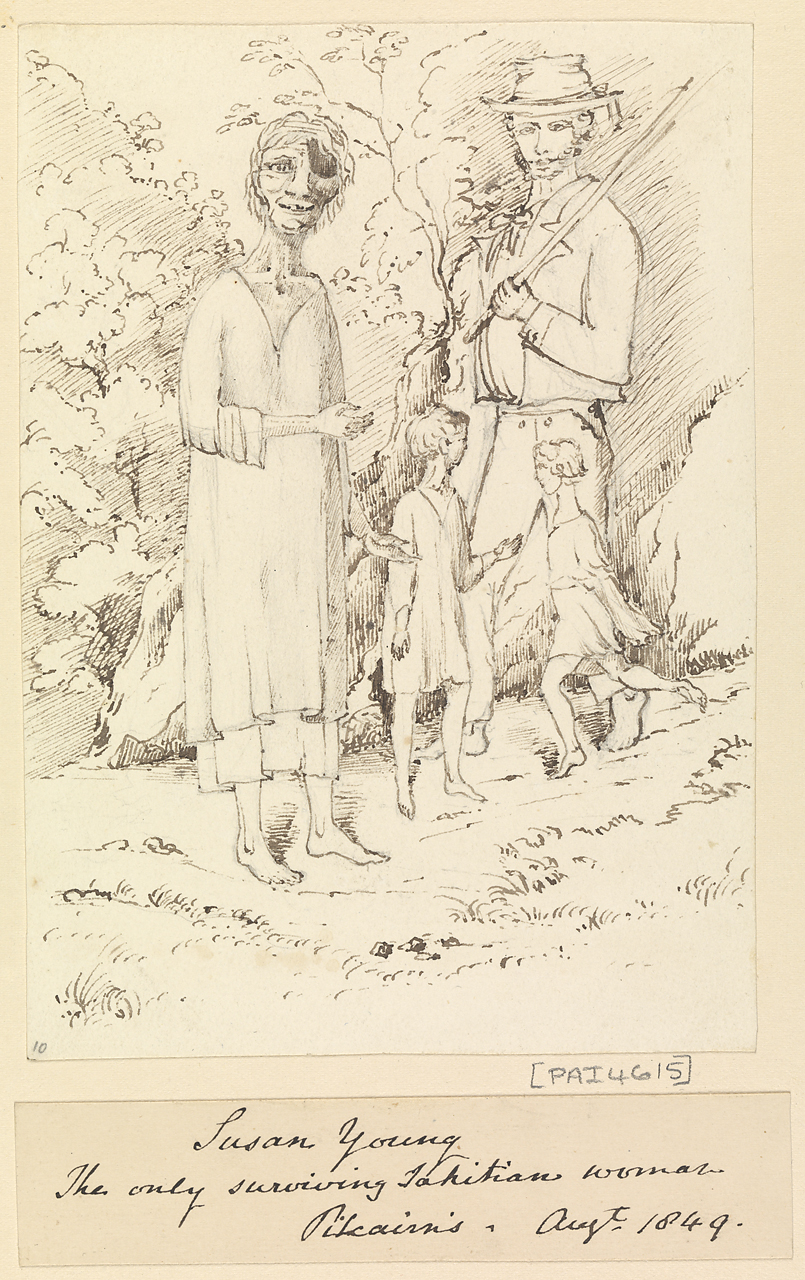
Original drawing of Teraura (Susan Young), made by Edward Fanshawe in 1849

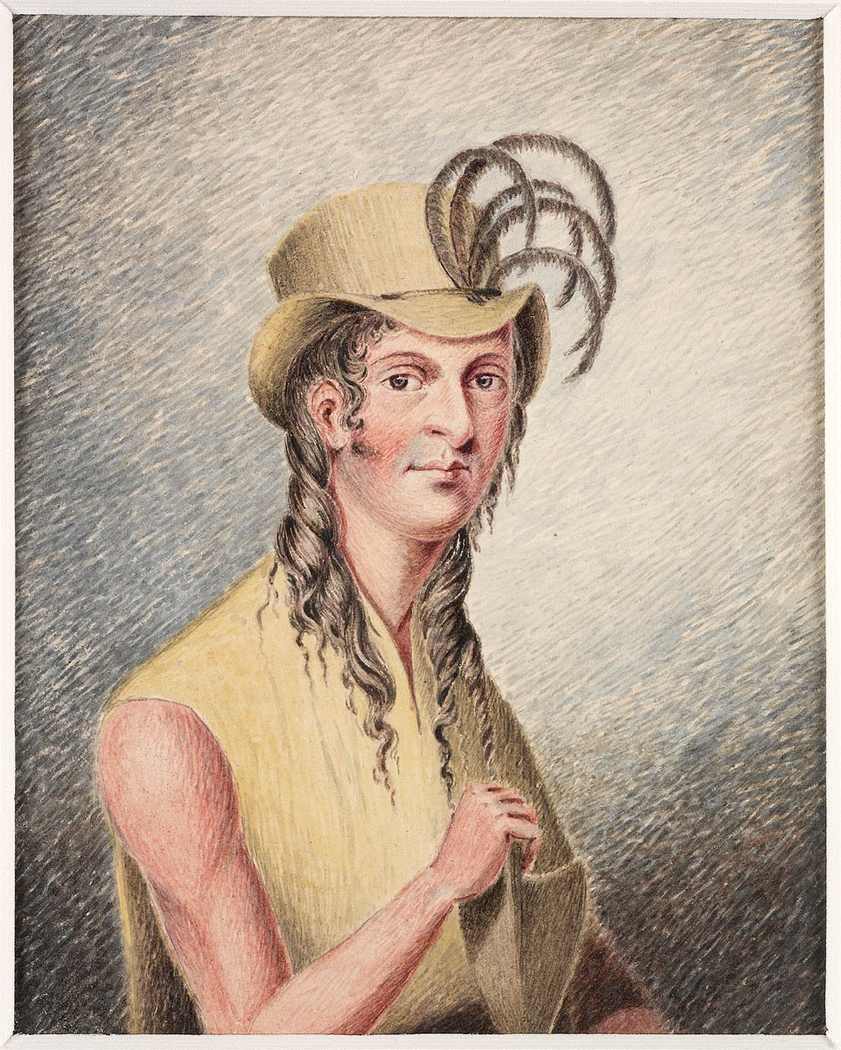
Thursday October Christian I, second 'husband' - died 1831

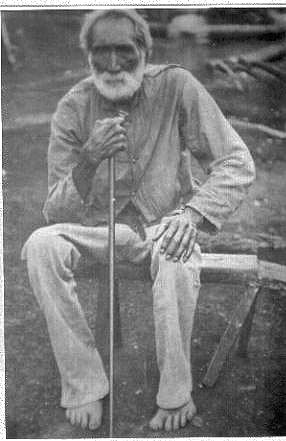
Thursday October Christian II - son of Teraura

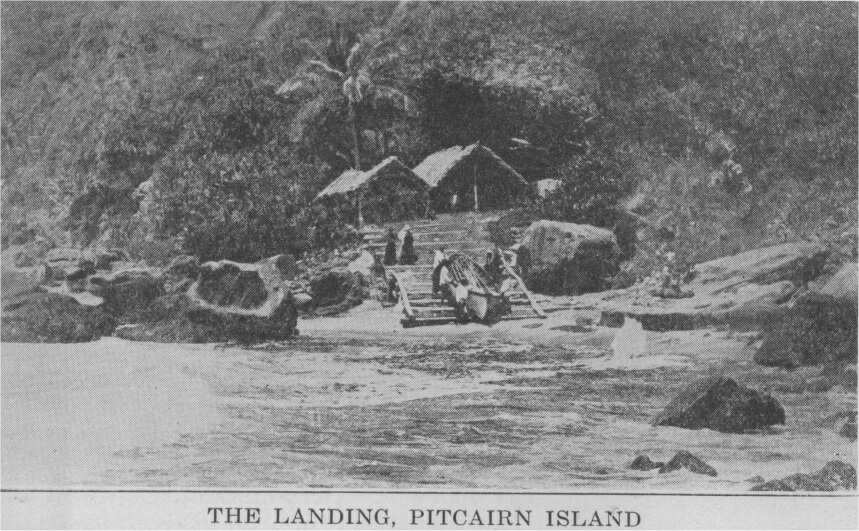
Pitcairn Island landing, c. 1842-90

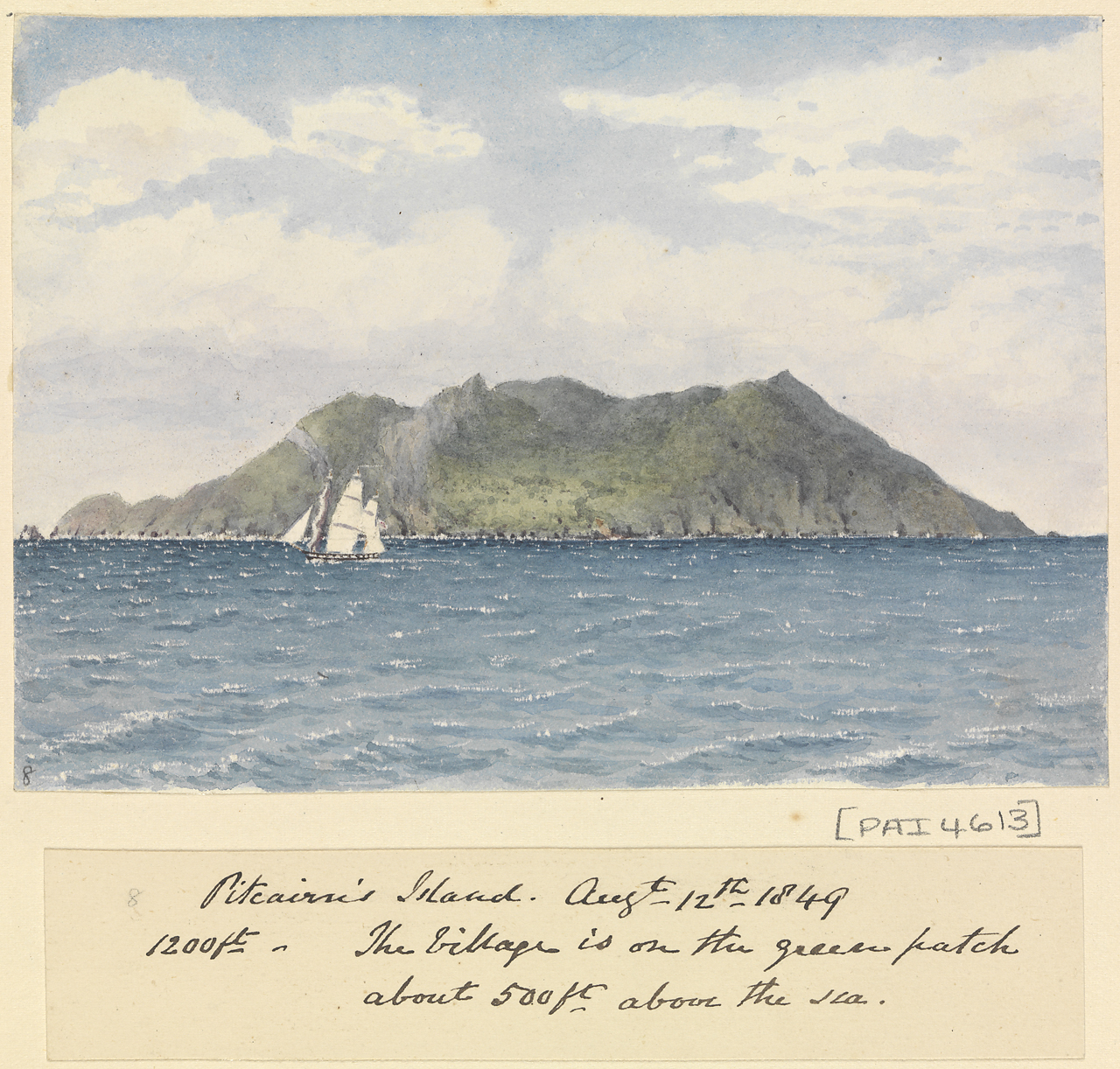
Pitcairn Island, 12 August 1849

== See also ==
- Mauatua
- Teio
