= Bounty Bible =

Bible thought to have been used on HMS Bounty

Coordinates: 25°3′58.66″S 130°6′1.73″W

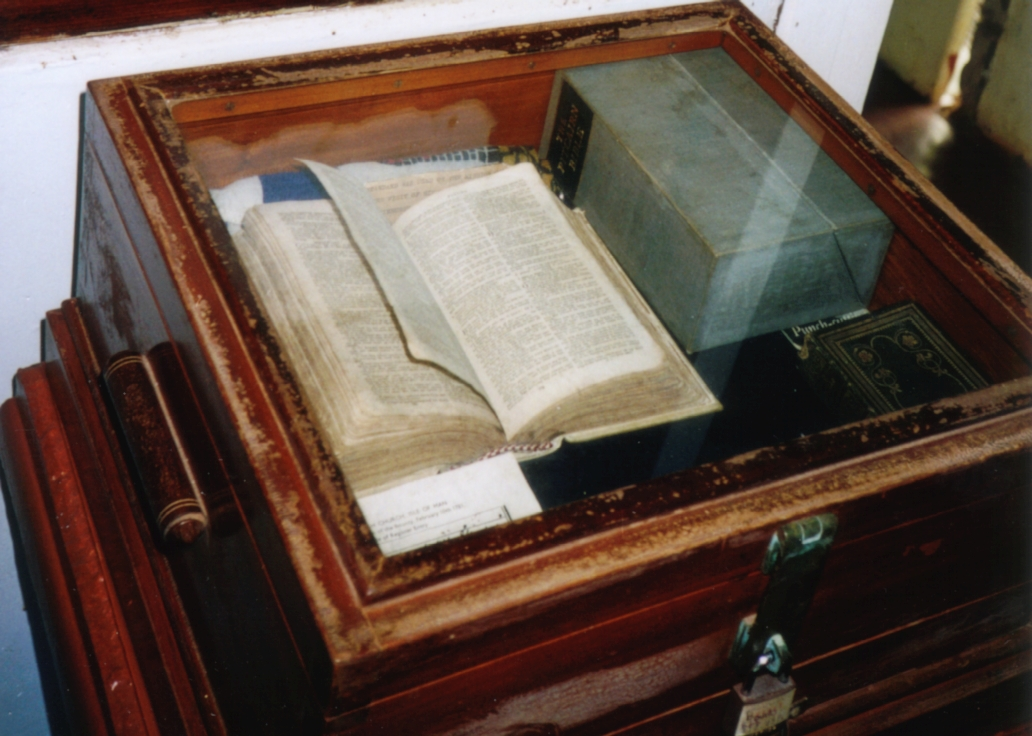
The Bounty Bible

The Bounty Bible is a Bible that is thought to have been used on HMS Bounty, the ship famed for the Mutiny on the Bounty.

== History ==
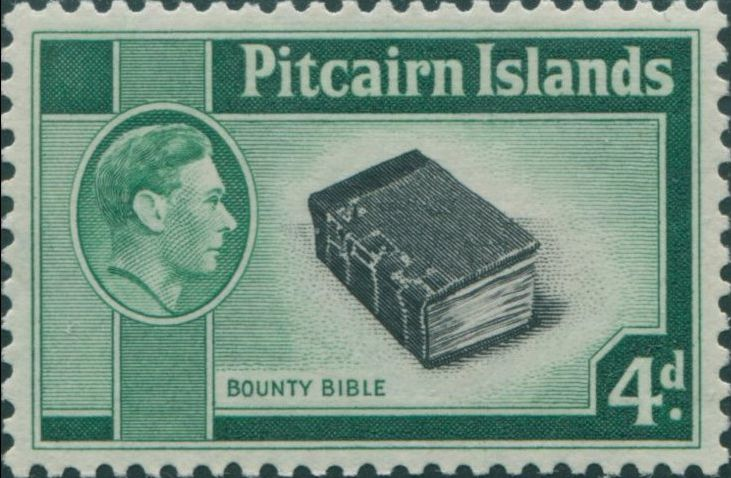
Bounty Bible on a 1951 Pitcairn stamp

In January 1790, nine of the mutineers from the ship and their Tahitian companions (six men, eleven women and a baby) settled on Pitcairn Island, having anchored HMS Bounty in a small bay on the northern side of the island and set her on fire after everything of utility was landed. Pitcairn had ample food, water and land for everyone and a mild climate. However after four years the community was in turmoil due to discontent and disorder fuelled by home-distilled alcohol and disputes over women that eventually led to the deaths of all but two of the mutineers; the survivors being Ned Young and John Adams (also known as Alexander Smith).

Young was an educated man and had been accepted as the leader of the island with Adams as his friend and deputy. He taught Adams to read using a Bible from HMS Bounty, which had been presented to the ship by the Naval and Military Bible Society (now the Naval Military & Air Force Bible Society) prior to sailing from England. When Young died of asthma six years later Adams ruled the community of 11 women and 23 children and had them follow a Christian way of life, as described in the Bible, observing the rules of the Church of England. He built a school and educated the children, using the Bible to teach them to read and write a little. In September 1808 the crew of a sealing ship from New England named the Topaz captained by Mayhew Folger landed on Pitcairn to take on water and they found that the inhabitants spoke English.

Adams died aged 63 on 23 March 1829 and the Bounty Bible was reportedly taken from the island on 17 July 1839, having been bequeathed by a grandson to a carpenter named Levi Hayton from the whaling ship Cyrus, who took it home to Windsor, Connecticut. In 1876 all the inhabitants of the Pitcairn Islands became Seventh Day Adventists after a successful Adventist mission. The Bible was presented to the Connecticut Historical Society in 1896.

== Return of the Bible to Pitcairn ==
Following a request for the return of the Bible by Pitcairn school teacher A.W. Moverley, after 110 years in the United States the Connecticut Historical Society passed it to Sir Oliver Franks, the British Ambassador in Washington, D.C., in March 1949. It was then restored and rebound in London and the Colonial Office had it transported back to Pitcairn via Fiji, where a wooden case was made for it, and it was presented to the people of the islands in February 1950, 160 years after the mutineers settled on Pitcairn. The Bible was held at the Church in Adamstown, Pitcairn, which was built in 1954, until a museum was opened in 2006. The Bible is now in the museum, preserved under glass with a facsimile of William and Elizabeth Bligh's marriage certificate, a prayer book, and other artifacts.

== Postage stamp ==
On 15 October 1940 the Pitcairn Islands Post Office opened with the release of the first Pitcairn Islands postage stamps; the 4d (fourpence) value issued on 1 September 1951 features an illustration of the Bible.

== See also ==
- Descendants of the Bounty Mutineers
- History of the Pitcairn Islands
