= Thursday October Christian I =

Son of HMS Bounty mutineer Fletcher Christian

Thursday October Christian
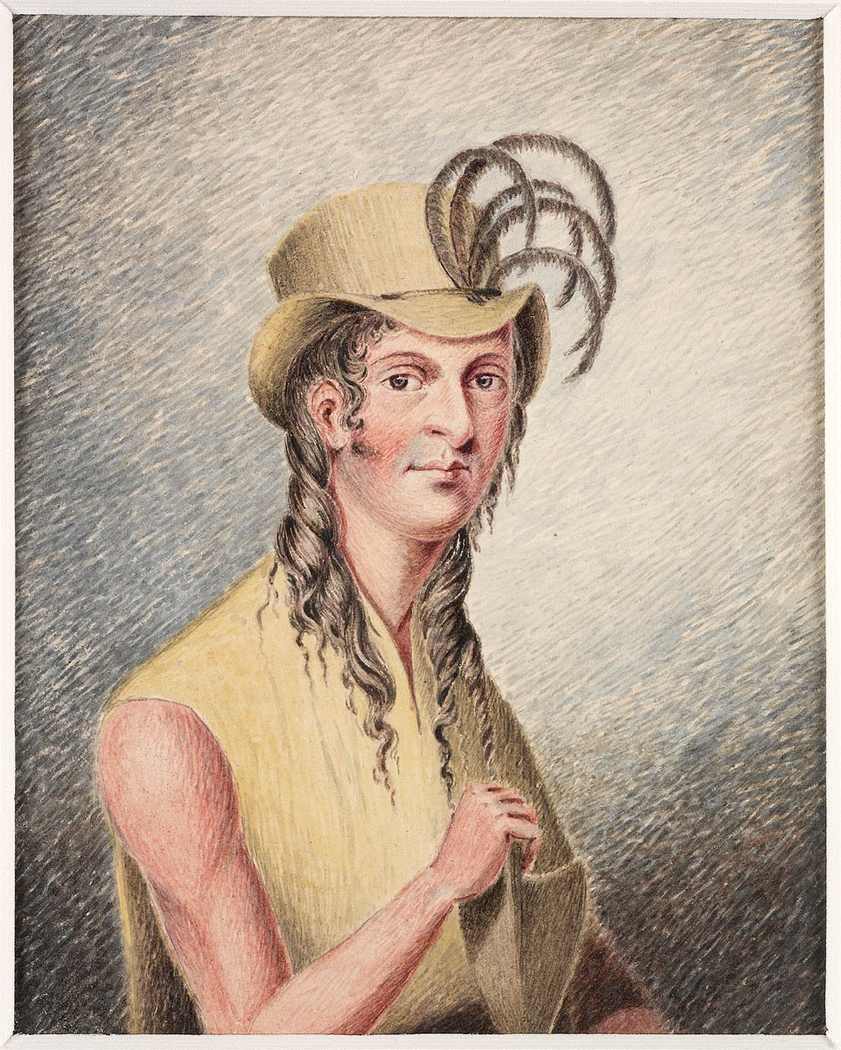
- Thursday October Christian, 1814, J. Shillibeer
- Born: 14 October 1790; Pitcairn Island
- Died: 21 April 1831 (aged 40); Papeete, Kingdom of Tahiti
- Spouse: Teraura
- Children: Joseph John Christian; Charles Christian; Mary Christian; Polly Christian; Peggy Christian; Thursday October Christian II
- Parents: Fletcher Christian (father); Mauatua Maimiti (mother)

Thursday October Christian (14 October 1790 – 21 April 1831) was the first son of Fletcher Christian (leader of the historical mutiny on the Bounty) and his Tahitian wife Mauatua. He was the first child born on the Pitcairn Islands after the mutineers took refuge on the island. Born on a Thursday in October, he was given his unusual name because Fletcher Christian wanted his son to have "no name that will remind me of England."

Thursday, at age 16, married an older Tahitian woman, Teraura (Susannah/Susan Young), who had been Ned Young's original consort. She was past 30 at the time of the marriage. The ceremony was carried out with a ring that had belonged to Ned Young.

== Meeting the British ==
When the British frigates Briton and Tagus arrived at Pitcairn on the morning of 17 September 1814, Thursday and George Young paddled out in canoes to meet them. Both spoke English well, and made a good impression on the officers and men of the ships as they met on the deck of the Briton. Their demeanour helped persuade the two captains that John Adams had created a civilized society, and did not merit prosecution for the mutiny. The ships stayed only for a few hours, and sailed away later that evening. This was when the only surviving portrait of Thursday was drawn.

Captain Philip Pipon, commander of the Tagus, describes Thursday as being "about twenty five years of age, a tall fine young man about six feet high, with dark black hair, and a countenance extremely open and interesting. He wore no clothes except a piece of cloth round his loins, a straw hat ornamented with black cock's feathers, and occasionally a peacock's, nearly similar to that worn by the Spaniards in South America, though smaller."

== Death in Tahiti ==
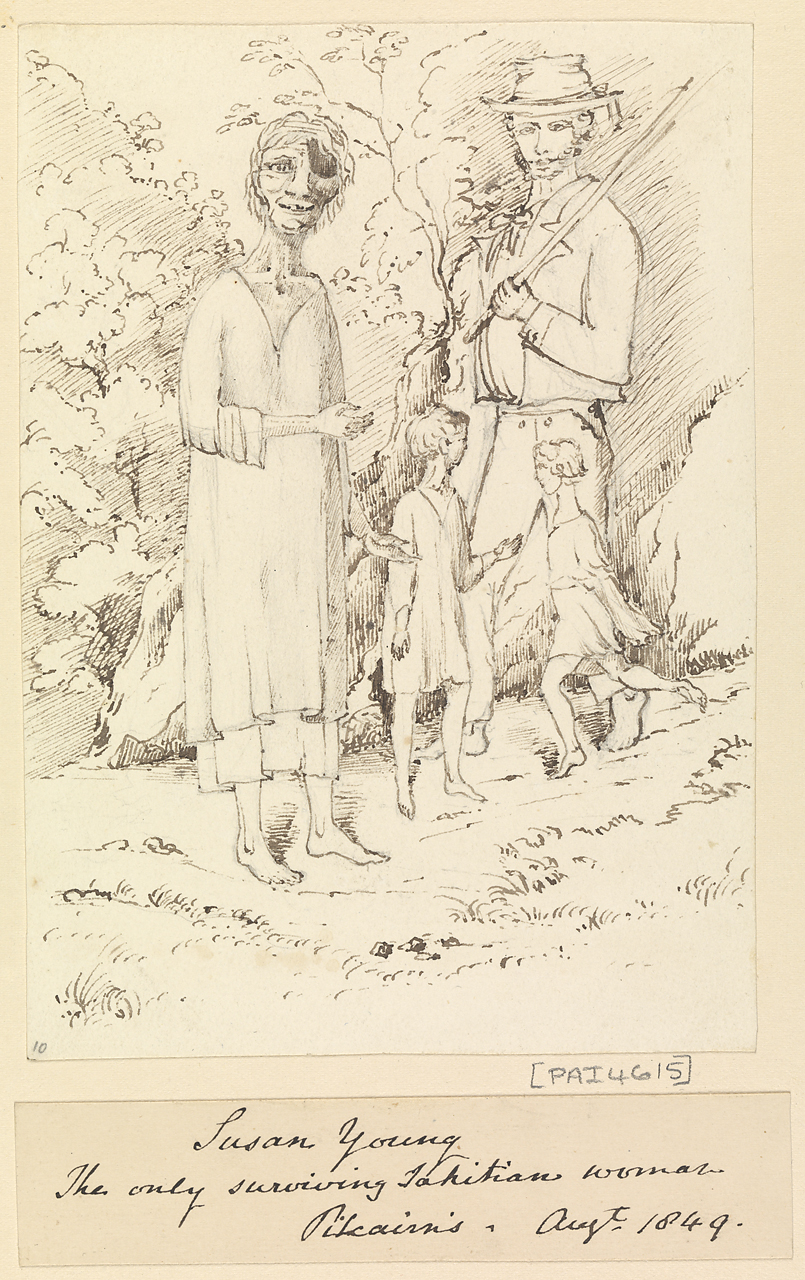
August 1849 Edward Gennys Fanshawe sketch of Susan Young, the only surviving Tahitian woman on Pitcairn's Island

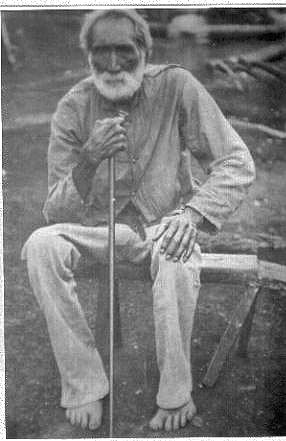
Thursday October Christian II 1820–1911

Along with a number of other Pitcairners, he migrated to Tahiti in 1831, but having no immunity to the diseases of the island he died on 21 April. At that point he had been "the oldest and perhaps the most respected of the first generation of native born islanders". Eleven other Pitcairners died in the same epidemic. Deprived of leadership, the group left Tahiti on 14 August 1831 to return to Pitcairn facilitated by Captain William Driver. His wife outlived him by 19 years. Thursday's third son was Thursday October Christian II (1820–1911).

For many years Thursday's house was the oldest building still standing on the island, until it was demolished on 12 March 2004 because of termite damage.

== Ancestry ==
Ancestors of Thursday October Christian I

16. Ewan Christian
8. John Christian
17. Mary Caine
4. Charles Christian
18. John Senhouse
9. Bridget Senhouse
19. Eleanor Kirby
2. Fletcher Christian
10. Jacob Dixon
5. Ann Dixon
22. Jacob Fletcher
11. Mary Fletcher
1. Thursday October Christian
3. Mauatua

== Literary references ==
Thursday's life story was written by R. M. Ballantyne in The Lonely Island; or, The Refuge of the Mutineers (1880). He also appears in Charles Dickens' The Long Voyage (1853).

Thursday October Christian is also mentioned on the Rasputina album Oh Perilous World.
