= Fletcher Christian =

English sailor (1764–1793)

- Portrait by Robert Dodd, 1790
- Born: 25 September 1764; Moorland Close, Eaglesfield, Cumberland, England
- Died: Uncertain, probably 20 September 1793 (aged 28); Uncertain, probably Pitcairn Island
- Occupation: Master's Mate
- Spouse: Mauatua 'Isabella' Christian
- Children: 3 including Thursday October Christian I
- Relatives: Edward Christian (brother); Edmund Law (uncle); The 1st Baron Ellenborough (cousin); George Henry Law (cousin); Thomas Law (cousin); Elizabeth Parke Custis Law (cousin-in-law)

Fletcher Christian (25 September 1764 – 20 September 1793) was an English sailor who led the mutiny on the Bounty in 1789, during which he seized command of the Royal Navy vessel HMS Bounty from Lieutenant William Bligh.

In 1787, Christian was appointed master's mate on Bounty, tasked with transporting breadfruit plants from Tahiti to the West Indies. Bligh subsequently named him acting lieutenant during the voyage. After a five-month layover in Tahiti, relations between Bligh and his crew deteriorated and, in April 1789, Christian led a mutiny and forced Bligh from the ship. Some of the mutineers were left on Tahiti, while Christian, eight other mutineers, six Tahitian men and eleven Tahitian women settled on the isolated Pitcairn Island, where they stripped and burned the vessel.

Christian died on Pitcairn, possibly killed in a conflict with Tahitians. His group was not found until 1808 and the sole surviving mutineer, John Adams, gave conflicting accounts of Christian's death.

== Early life ==
Fletcher Christian was born on 25 September 1764, at his family home of Moorland Close, Eaglesfield, near Cockermouth in Cumberland, England. His father's side of the family had originated from the Isle of Man and most of Fletcher's paternal great-grandfathers were historic Deemsters, their original family surname being McCrystyn.

Fletcher and his brothers Edward and Humphrey were the three sons of Charles Christian, an attorney-at-law descended from Manx gentry, and his wife Ann Dixon. Charles was heir of Moorland Close and of the large Ewanrigg Hall estate on the outskirts of Maryport, Cumberland.

Charles's marriage to Ann brought with it the small property of Moorland Close, "a quadrangle pile of buildings ... half castle, half farmstead." The property can be seen to the north of the Cockermouth to Egremont A5086 road. Charles died in 1768 when Fletcher was not yet four. Ann proved herself grossly irresponsible with money. By 1779, when Fletcher was fifteen, Ann had run up a debt of nearly £6,500 (equal to £977,683 today), and faced the prospect of debtors' prison. Moorland Close was lost and Ann and her three younger children were forced to flee to the Isle of Man, to their relative's estate, where English creditors had no power.

The three elder Christian sons managed to arrange a £40 (equal to £6,017 today) per year annuity for their mother, allowing the family to live in genteel poverty. Christian spent seven years at the Cockermouth Free School from the age of nine. One of his younger contemporaries there was Cockermouth native William Wordsworth. It is commonly suggested that the two were "school friends"; in fact, Christian was six years older than Wordsworth. His mother Ann died on the Isle of Man in 1819.

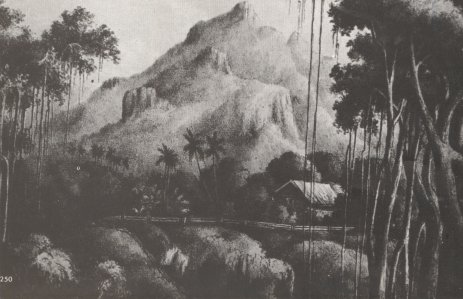
Fletcher Christian's house

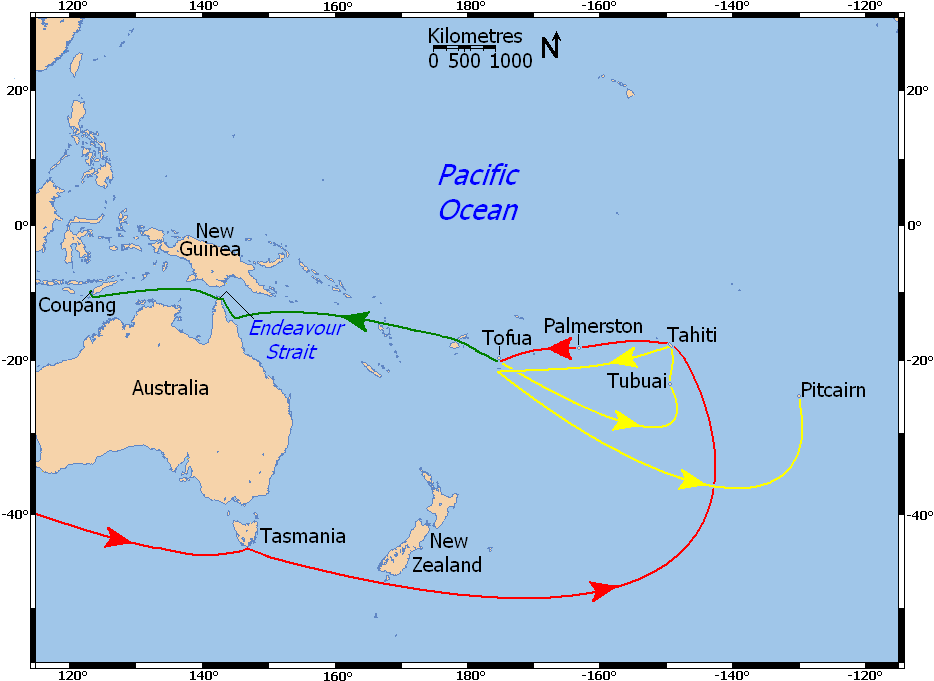
Map showing Bounty's movements in the Pacific Ocean, 1788–1790 Voyage of Bounty to Tahiti and to the location of the mutiny, 28 April 1789 Movements of Bounty after the mutiny, under Christian's command Course of Bligh's open-boat journey to Coupang

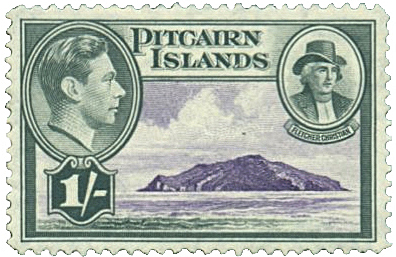
Postage stamp, UK issue for Pitcairn Islands (1940) showing King George VI and an artist's interpretation of Fletcher Christian

== Naval career ==
See here for a comparison of assignments to William Bligh

Fletcher Christian began his naval career at a late age, joining the Royal Navy as a cabin boy when he was already seventeen years old (the average age for this position was between 12 and 15). He served for over a year on a third-rate ship-of-the-line along with his future commander, William Bligh, who was posted as the ship's sixth lieutenant. Christian next became a midshipman on the sixth-rate post ship HMS Eurydice and was made master's mate six months after the ship put to sea. The muster rolls of HMS Eurydice indicate Christian was signed on for a 21-month voyage to India. The ship's muster shows Christian's conduct was more than satisfactory because "some seven months out from England, he had been promoted from midshipman to master's mate".

After Eurydice had returned from India, Christian was reverted to midshipman and paid off from the Royal Navy. Unable to find another midshipman assignment, Christian decided to join the British merchant fleet and applied for a berth on board William Bligh's ship Britannia. Bligh had himself been discharged from the Royal Navy and was now a merchant captain. Bligh accepted Christian on the ship's books as an able seaman, but granted him all the rights of a ship's officer including dining and berthing in the officer quarters. On a second voyage to Jamaica with Bligh, Christian was rated as the ship's second mate.

In 1787 Bligh approached Christian to serve on board HMAV Bounty for a two-year voyage to transport breadfruit from Tahiti to the West Indies. Bligh originally had every intention of Christian serving as the ship's master, but the Navy Board turned down this request due to Christian's low seniority in service years and appointed John Fryer instead. Christian was retained as master's mate. The following year, halfway through the Bounty's voyage, Bligh appointed Christian as acting lieutenant, thus making him senior to Fryer.

On 28 April 1789, Fletcher Christian led a mutiny on board the Bounty and from this point forward was considered an outlaw. He was formally stripped of his naval rank in March 1790 and discharged after Bligh returned to England and reported the mutiny to the Admiralty Board.

Date	Rank	Ship (number of guns)
March 1782	Ship's boy	HMS Cambridge (80)
25 April 1783	Midshipman	HMS Eurydice (24)
24 May 1784	Master's Mate	HMS Eurydice (24)
June 1785	Discharged and paid off from Royal Navy	
1786	Able seaman	Merchant Vessel Britannia
1786	Second Mate	Merchant Vessel Britannia
September 1787	Master's mate	HM Armed Vessel Bounty
2 March 1788	Acting lieutenant	HM Armed Vessel Bounty
28 April 1789	Mutiny on the Bounty	HM Armed Vessel Bounty
March 1790	Stripped of Naval rank and discharged in absentia	

== Mutiny on the Bounty ==
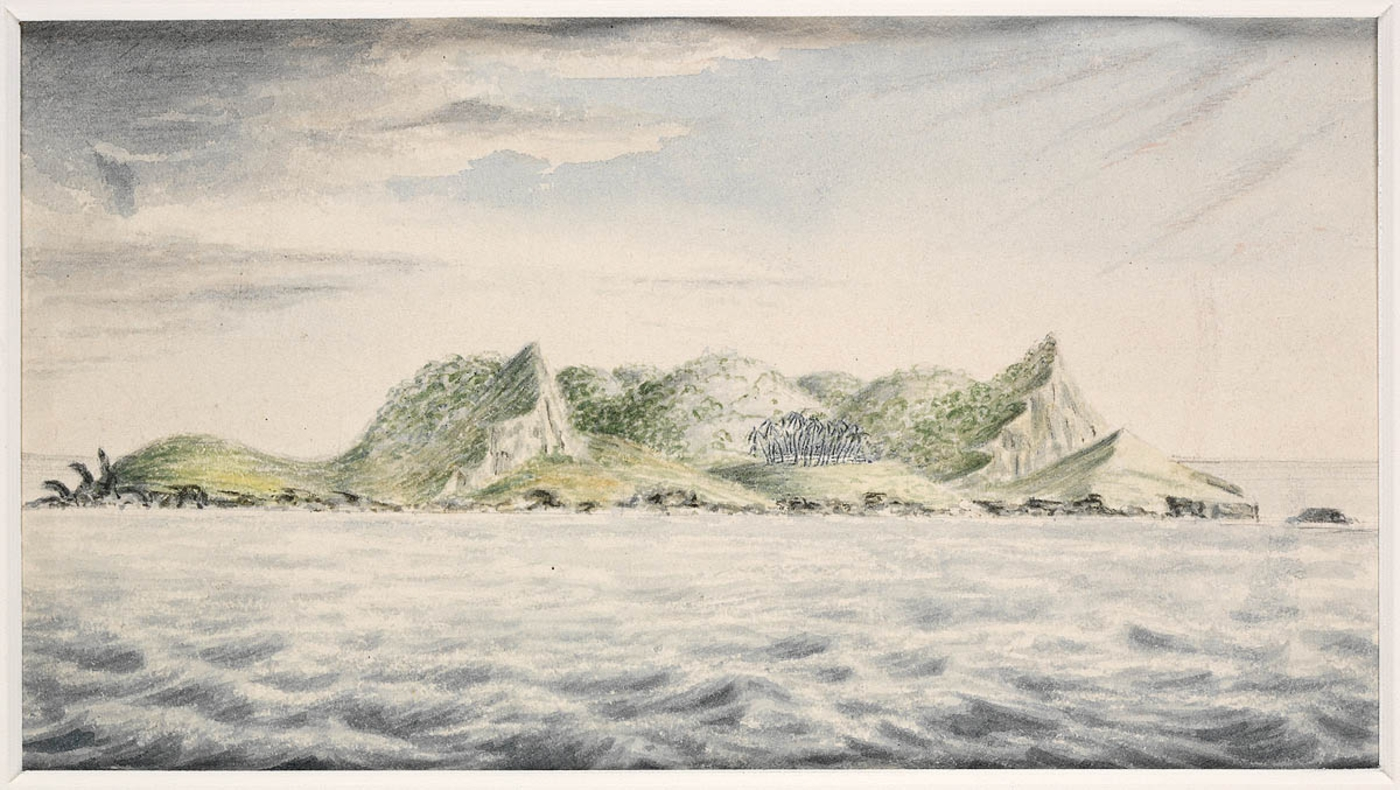
A view of Pitcairn's Island, South Seas, 1814, by J. Shillibeer

In 1787, Christian was appointed master's mate on Bounty, on Bligh's recommendation, for the ship's breadfruit expedition to Tahiti. During the voyage out, Bligh appointed him acting lieutenant. Bounty arrived at Tahiti on 26 October 1788 and Christian spent the next five months there.

Bounty set sail with its cargo of breadfruit plantings on 4 April 1789. Some 1,300 miles west of Tahiti, near Tonga, mutiny broke out on 28 April 1789, led by Christian. According to accounts, the sailors were attracted to the "idyllic" life and sexual opportunities afforded on the Pacific island of Tahiti. Following the court-martial of captured mutineers, Edward Christian argued that they were motivated by Bligh's allegedly harsh treatment of them. Eighteen mutineers set Bligh afloat in a small boat with eighteen of the twenty-two crew loyal to him. Of those who went with Bligh only one man died (killed by natives); of those remaining after rescue: three died of malaria and two others were lost at sea. Bligh's first detailed comments on the mutiny are in a letter to his wife Betsy, in which he names Peter Heywood (a mere boy not yet 17) as "one of the ringleaders", adding: "I have now reason to curse the day I ever knew a Christian or a Heywood or indeed a Manks [sic] man. Bligh's later official account to the Admiralty lists Heywood with Christian, Edward Young and George Stewart as the mutiny's leaders, describing Heywood as a young man of abilities for whom he had felt a particular regard. To the Heywood family Bligh wrote: "His baseness is beyond all description." Heywood was found guilty but pardoned; Stewart drowned when the Pandora sank in 1791; Young slept through the mutiny although he did join the mutineers ex post facto.

Following the mutiny, Christian first travelled to Tahiti, where he married Maimiti (also known as Mauatua), the daughter of one of the local chiefs. He then attempted to build a colony on Tubuai, but there the mutineers came into conflict with natives. Abandoning the island, he stopped briefly in Tahiti again, and dropped off sixteen crewmen. These sixteen included four Bligh loyalists who had been left behind on Bounty and two who had neither participated in, nor resisted, the mutiny. The remaining nine mutineers, six Tahitian men and eleven Tahitian women, then sailed eastward. In time, they landed on Pitcairn Island, where they stripped Bounty of all that could be floated ashore before Matthew Quintal set it on fire, stranding them. The resulting sexual imbalance, combined with the effective enslavement of the Tahitian men by the mutineers, led to insurrection and the deaths of most of the men.

== Death ==
The American seal-hunting ship Topaz visited Pitcairn in 1808 and found only one mutineer, John Adams (who had used the alias Alexander Smith while on Bounty), still alive along with nine Tahitian women. The mutineers who had perished had, however, already had children with their Tahitian wives. Most of these children were still living. Adams and Maimiti claimed Christian had been murdered during the conflict between the Tahitian men and the mutineers. According to an account by a Pitcairn woman named Jenny who left the island in 1817, Christian was shot while working by a pond next to the home of his pregnant wife. Along with Christian, four other mutineers and all six of the Tahitian men who had come to the island were killed in the conflict. William McCoy, one of the four surviving mutineers, fell off a cliff while intoxicated and was killed. Quintal was later killed by the remaining two mutineers, Adams and Ned Young, after he attacked them. Young became the new leader of Pitcairn.

John Adams gave conflicting accounts of Christian's death to visitors on ships that subsequently visited Pitcairn. He was variously said to have died of natural causes, committed suicide, become insane or been murdered.

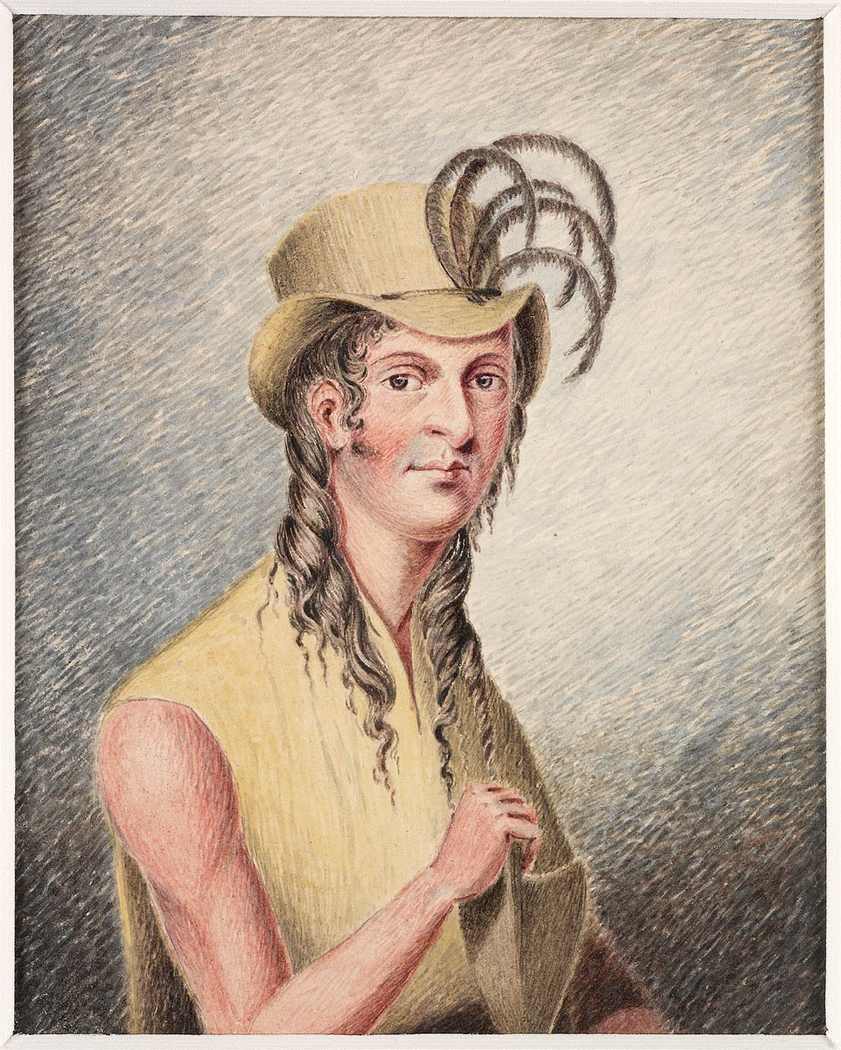
Fletcher Christian's son Thursday October Christian in 1814 at the age of 24, by J. Shillibeer

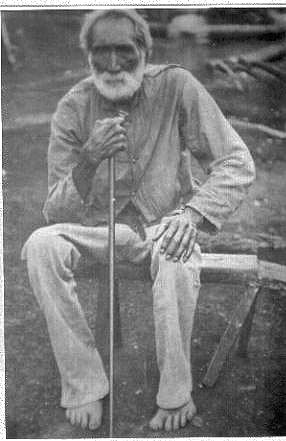
Fletcher Christian's grandson Thursday October Christian II [1820-1911] who married Mary Young, granddaughter of Edward Young. Photo c. 1890

Christian was survived by Maimiti and his son, Thursday October Christian (born 1790). Besides Thursday October, Fletcher Christian also had a younger son named Charles Christian (born 1792) and a daughter Mary Ann Christian (born 1793). Through Thursday and Charles, Fletcher is the ancestor of almost everybody with the surname Christian on Pitcairn and Norfolk Islands, as well as the many descendants who have moved to Australia, New Zealand and the United States.

Rumours have persisted for more than two hundred years that Christian's murder was faked, that he had left the island and that he made his way back to England. Many scholars believe that the rumours of Christian returning to England helped to inspire Samuel Taylor Coleridge's The Rime of the Ancient Mariner.

There is no portrait or drawing extant of Fletcher Christian that was drawn from life. Bligh described Christian as "5 ft. 9 in. high [175 cm] - Dark swarthy complexion. Hair – Blackish or very dark brown. Make – Strong. A star tatowed [sic] on his left breast, and tatowed [sic] on the backside. His knees stand a little out and he may be called a little bow legged. He is subject to violent perspiration, particularly in his hand, so that he soils anything he handles".

== In film and fiction ==
=== Appearances in literature ===
Christian's principal literary appearances are in the treatments of Bounty story, including Mutiny on the Bounty (1932), Pitcairn's Island (1934) and After the Bounty (an edited version of James Morrison's journal, 2009). He also appears in R. M. Ballantyne's The Lonely Island; or, The Refuge of the Mutineers (1880) and in Charles Dickens' The Long Voyage (1853).

Stanley Miller's 1973 novel Mr. Christian! posited that Christian knew nothing of the mutiny until it had been completely organized and he was offered the choice of being shot along with Bligh or taking command of the ship and the mutineers. In Peter F. Hamilton's Night's Dawn trilogy, Fletcher Christian's ghost appears, possessing a human body, and helps two non-possessed girls escape. William Kinsolving's 1996 novel Mister Christian and Val McDermid's 2006 thriller The Grave Tattoo are both based on Christian's rumoured return to the Lake District and the fact that he was at school with William Wordsworth. Dan L. Thrapp's 2002 novel Mutiny's Curse is based on a similar premise. In 1959 Louis MacNeice produced a BBC Radio play called I Call Me Adam, written by Laurie Lee, about the mutineers' lives on Pitcairn.

=== Film portrayals ===
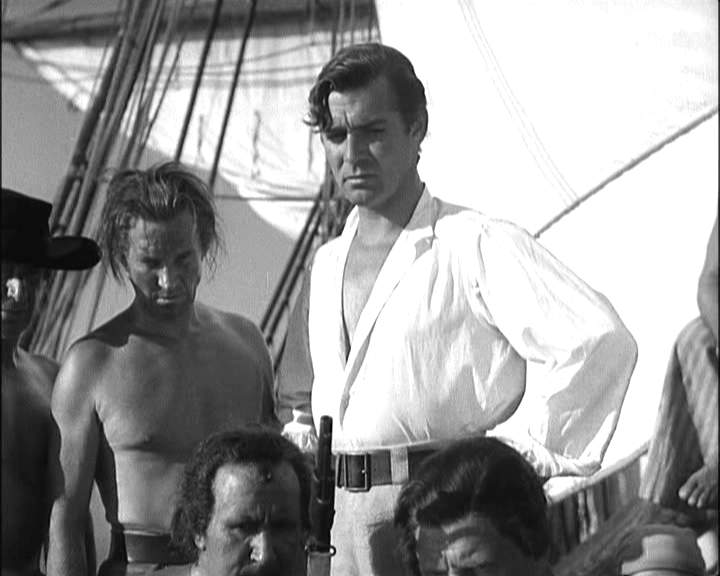
Clark Gable as Fletcher Christian

Christian is portrayed by:

- Wilton Powers (1916) The Mutiny of the Bounty
- Errol Flynn (1933) In the Wake of the Bounty
- Clark Gable (1935) Mutiny on the Bounty
- Marlon Brando (1962) Mutiny on the Bounty
- Mel Gibson (1984) The Bounty

The 1935 and 1962 films are based on the 1932 novel Mutiny on the Bounty in which Christian is a major character and is generally portrayed positively. The authors of that novel, Charles Nordhoff and James Norman Hall, also wrote two sequels, one of which, Pitcairn's Island, is the story of the tragic events after the mutiny that apparently resulted in Christian's death along with other violent deaths on Pitcairn Island. (The other sequel, Men Against the Sea, is the story of Bligh's voyage after the mutiny.) This series of novels uses fictionalised versions of minor crew members as narrators of the stories. The 1984 film offers a less sympathetic image of Christian.

=== Musical portrayals ===
- Four Jacks "The Story of Bounty" (1962)
- The Rolling Stones "Dancing in the Light" (1972)
- David Essex in Mutiny! (1985)
- Mekons "(Sometimes I Feel Like) Fletcher Christian" from So Good It Hurts (Sin Record Company/Cooking Vinyl, Rough Trade Records Germany) (1988)
- Rasputina "Cage in a Cave", from Oh Perilous World (Filthy Bonnet) (2007)

== See also ==
- Garth Christian – a relative
- Descendants of the Bounty mutineers – Thomas Colman Christian, who died 7 July 2013.

Political offices
New title Mutiny on the Bounty	Leader of the Pitcairn Islands; 23 January 1790 – 20 September 1793	Succeeded by Ned Young
