= George Adams (magistrate) =

British politician

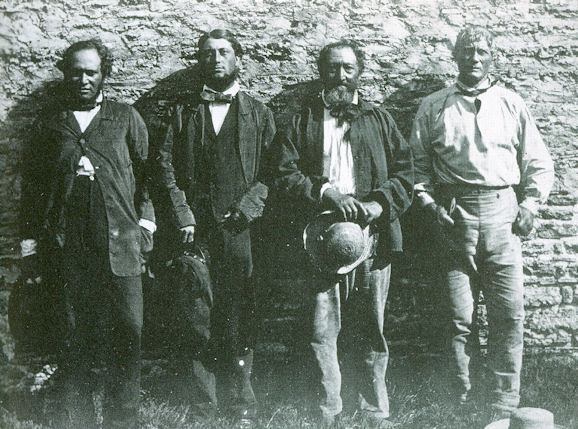
- Descendants of the mutineers John Adams and Matthew Quintal on Norfolk Island, 1862. From Left to right:John Adams 1827-1897 son of George Adams; John Quintal 1820-1912 son of Arthur Quintal; George Adams 1804-1873 son of John Adams; Arthur Quintal 1795-1873 son of Matthew Quintal
- Born: June 4, 1804; Adamstown, Pitcairn Islands
- Died: October 29, 1873 (aged 69); Kingston, Norfolk Island
- Resting place: Norfolk Island Cemetery
- Title: Magistrate of the Pitcairn Islands
- Predecessor: Charles Christian II
- Successor: Simon Young
- Opponent: Joshua Hill
- Spouses: Polly Young Adams; Sarah Quintal McCoy-Adams
- Children: 3
- Parents: John Adams; Teio Adams

George Adams (6 June 1804 – 29 October 1873) was the only son of the Bounty Mutineer John Adams. He was born to his wife Teio, who had once been the wife of William McCoy and was the mother-in-law of Charles Christian, on Pitcairn Island. Adams was born at a time when all the original mutineers apart from his own father had been killed or, in the case of Ned Young, died of natural causes. In 1808 the Pitcairn colony was discovered and the elder Adams was granted amnesty for his part in the mutiny. Both of Adams's parents died in March 1829, when George was 24 years old. Adams served as Chief Magistrate on Pitcairn in 1848. Adams was an opponent of Joshua Hill in the 1830s. Adams opposed the decision to move to Norfolk Island in the 1850s, as his granddaughter was ill. Adams did eventually move, and died on Norfolk Island in 1873.
