= The Bounty (1984 film) =

1984 film by Roger Donaldson

- Theatrical release poster illustrated by Brian Bysouth
- Directed by: Roger Donaldson
- Screenplay by: Robert Bolt
- Based on: Captain Bligh and Mr. Christian (1972 book) by Richard Hough
- Produced by: Bernard Williams; Dino De Laurentiis
- Starring: Mel Gibson; Anthony Hopkins; Edward Fox; Laurence Olivier
- Cinematography: Arthur Ibbetson
- Edited by: Tony Lawson
- Music by: Vangelis
- Production companies: Dino De Laurentiis Corporation; Bounty Productions Ltd.
- Distributed by: Thorn EMI Screen Entertainment
- Release dates: 4 May 1984 (US); 5 October 1984 (UK)
- Running time: 132 minutes
- Country: United Kingdom
- Language: English
- Budget: $20–25 million
- Box office: $18.3 million

The Bounty is a 1984 British historical drama film directed by Roger Donaldson. It depicts the voyage and mutiny of HMS Bounty, with Robert Bolt's screenplay adapting the 1972 book Captain Bligh and Mr. Christian by Richard Hough. It stars Mel Gibson as Fletcher Christian and Anthony Hopkins as William Bligh, with supporting roles played by Laurence Olivier, Daniel Day-Lewis, Liam Neeson, Bernard Hill and Edward Fox.

The Bounty began pre-production in late 1978 under director David Lean as a long-time passion project, but multiple complications, including a prohibitively high budget and screenwriter Robert Bolt suffering from a heart attack, led to a period of development hell that ended with the hiring of newcomer director Donaldson. Filming took place primarily on location in Donaldson's home country of New Zealand, French Polynesia, and England. Vangelis composed the film's score.

The film was made by Dino De Laurentiis Productions and Bounty Productions Ltd. and distributed by Thorn EMI Screen Entertainment in the UK, and Orion Pictures internationally. It premiered on 4 May 1984 and received generally positive reviews, with praise for Hopkins' portrayal of Bligh, and was noted by critics and historians as being a more historically accurate depiction of the mutiny than previous depictions, though reactions to Gibson's performance were more polarised. The Bounty was entered into the 1984 Cannes Film Festival, where it was nominated for the Palme d’Or.

== Plot ==
The court of inquiry of Commanding Lieutenant William Bligh for the loss of Bounty to mutineers begins. Via flashbacks, Bounty sets out from Portsmouth on 23 December 1787, on an expedition to Tahiti to gather breadfruit pods for transplantation in the Caribbean; Bligh electing to sail the ship west round the tip of South America to fulfill a lifelong ambition to circumnavigate the globe. After 31 days, the attempt to round Cape Horn fails due to harsh weather, and the ship is obliged to take the longer eastern route. Bligh promotes his friend, master's mate Fletcher Christian, to sailing master. The ship's alcoholic surgeon, Thomas Huggan, escapes punishment for killing a man in a botched operation.

Arriving in Tahiti in October 1788, Bligh finds that due to the delays, the wind is against them for a quick return journey, and they must stay on the island for four months longer than planned. Many of the weary crew, relieved to land, eventually develop a taste for the pleasures that island life offers, especially the native women; Christian immerses himself in Tahitian culture, making his relationship with Bligh tense. Three crew members, including the popular Charles Churchill, desert rather than be forced to leave the island. Bligh hunts the men down and has them flogged. Huggan is found dead after excessive drinking.

When the ship departs Tahiti, Fletcher is forced to leave his pregnant native lover, Mauatua, behind. Bligh tightens shipboard discipline in response to the desertion attempt. He insists that the ship is filthy and orders the crew to clean it several times a day, hands out more arbitrary chores, and limits rations. Many of the men, including Christian, are singled out for tongue-lashings, especially when he dares suggest to Bligh that they should avoid going around Cape Horn.

Christian considers constructing a raft to escape; playing on his resentment against Bligh's treatment of both him and the men, midshipman Edward Young persuades Christian to take the Bounty by force. When Bligh again dismisses his concerns, Christian has the captain roused from his bed and taken to the deck. There, Bligh and those loyal to him are forced into a longboat, minimally supplied, and cast adrift. Following an incident where natives on the island of Tofua kill one of their number, Bligh and his crew agree to try to reach the Dutch East Indies. Forced to restrain his arrogant personality, Bligh's leadership and resourcefulness enable the remaining loyalists to reach safety.

Christian and the mutineers sail back to Tahiti. King Tynah, however, fears that their mutiny could incite British retaliation against his people. Realizing the folly of staying, the mutineers get permission to collect food and take their lovers with them. Christian pleads with Tynah to allow his daughter to decide her own destiny. Tynah concedes, and Mauatua chooses the uncertainty of a life with Christian over remaining with her father. Churchill and several others force Christian to leave them behind as he tries to find a safe haven where the Royal Navy cannot find the mutineers.

After suppressing another attempted mutiny, Christian finds Pitcairn Island, a place not marked on British maps of the region. As the crew burn the Bounty to cover their tracks, seaman John Adams muses to Christian that they will never see England again. The judgement of Bligh's court-martial is read by Admiral Hood: Bligh is exonerated of all blame of the loss of the Bounty and receives a commendation for courage and exemplary seamanship. Bligh sheathes his sword with a slight tremor, thanks Hood and departs. A resigned Christian watches Bounty sink.

== Cast ==
- Mel Gibson as Master's Mate Fletcher Christian
- Anthony Hopkins as Lieutenant (Note: At the time of the Bounty's voyage, Bligh held the naval rank of Lieutenant, but as Captain of the vessel he would be addressed on-board as Captain.) William Bligh
- Daniel Day-Lewis as Sailing Master John Fryer
- Philip Davis as Edward Young
- Bernard Hill as William Cole
- Liam Neeson as Seaman Charles Churchill
- Philip Martin Brown as Seaman John Adams
- Tevaite Vernette as Mauatua
- Wi Kuki Kaa as King Tynah
- Edward Fox as Captain Greetham
- Laurence Olivier as Admiral Hood
- Simon Chandler as David Nelson
- Malcolm Terris as Dr. Thomas Huggan
- John Sessions as John Smith
- Andrew Wilde as Seaman William McCoy
- Neil Morrissey as Seaman Matthew Quintal
- Richard Graham as John Mills
- Dexter Fletcher as Seaman Thomas Ellison
- Pete Lee-Wilson as William Purcell
- Jon Gadsby as John Norton
- Barry Dransfield as Michael Byrne
- Steve Fletcher as Seaman James Valentine
- Jack May as Prosecuting Captain
- Mary Kauila as Queen Tynah
- Sharon Bower as Betsy Bligh

== Production ==
=== Development ===
==== David Lean ====
The film was originally a longstanding project of director David Lean and his frequent collaborator, Robert Bolt. They started working on a script in Bora Bora in October 1977. Lean and Bolt planned to make two films, one named The Lawbreakers that would deal with the voyage out to Tahiti and the subsequent mutiny, and the second named The Long Arm, which would be a study of the journey and the mutineers after the mutiny, as well as the admiralty's response in sending out the frigate HMS Pandora.

In November 1977, producer Dino De Laurentiis announced he would finance the project and make it after his version of the Hurricane. Phil Kellogg was to produce the films. In December of that year, Paramount announced they would finance and distribute. The intention was to shoot the film in Tahiti, where De Laurentiis had built a large facility for shooting Hurricane, including a brand-new hotel.

While working on the script, Lean directed a documentary, Lost and Found: The Story of Cook's Anchor, about discovering an anchor that belonged to a ship of Captain James Cook. In August 1978, Lean said he expected each film to cost $25 million. "With the high brow critics you're as good as dead if you spend that sort of money on a film", he said. "For that kind of money, the argument runs, anyone should be able to make a good picture. Which is absolute rubbish." A replica of The Bounty was built in New Zealand. A script was finished by November 1978.

Bernard Williams became attached as producer. He says Lean and De Laurentiis assumed both films could be made for $40 million in total, but Williams budgeted The Lawbreakers alone at $40 million. De Laurentiis decided he could not afford to proceed. "Dino is no longer behind the project", said Kellogg in November, adding "The first script is finished and the second is underway. I expect the pictures to go in about a year by now and we'll make them back to back."

On 12 April 1979, Bolt suffered a massive heart attack, followed by a stroke two days later, with the second script incomplete. In August 1979, Anthony Hopkins announced Lean had asked him to play William Bligh. The producers looked at making the project as a seven-part TV series. Paramount were interested but decided to pull out after two months feeling the project was too "masculine" and lacked female interest. Lean tried to interest Sam Spiegel who persuaded the director to make just the one film. Lean had a go at the script himself.

Lean was ultimately forced to abandon the project after overseeing casting and the construction of the Bounty replica which cost $4 million. In June 1981 the producer was trying to sell the replica. "It was three years' work wasted", said Lean later. "And the sad part is, it was the best script I've ever had. It was really a cracker it would have made a marvellous film. But after all that work they pulled the rug from under me." De Laurentiis did not want to lose the millions he had already put into the project—$2 million in development costs plus the cost of the ship—and looked for another director.

==== Roger Donaldson ====
Australian director Roger Donaldson had forged a career in New Zealand with Sleeping Dogs and Smash Palace. The latter was the first New Zealand film to obtain a distributor in the US. Donaldson said he met with De Laurentiis to discuss filming Conan the Destroyer, the sequel to Conan the Barbarian. Donaldson worked on a new script for that film. "Some time during that period I mentioned that I thought The Bounty sounded like an interesting project", Donaldson said. "Well, when I finished with the Conan script, he didn't really like it so I figured, well, I'm finished with Dino."

Di Laurentiis then offered Donaldson The Bounty despite not having seen any of the director's films and the fact that his biggest budget to date had been $1 million. (De Laurentiis later said he gave Donaldson the job on the basis of Smash Palace.) "Making the movie was something that, initially, I wasn't sure I wanted to do", said Donaldson. "I thought it might be perceived as some sort of a remake. But I looked at it and decided I'd do it as long as I could do something completely on my own, not a remake at all, but based much more on fact—something to set the record straight." "I saw it as an intense personal drama about two friends who have a tragic and violent falling out—a drama in which your sympathies change as events change", Donaldson said. "When you leave the movie, I hope that deep down you feel that you've understood a relationship between two men."

=== Casting ===
Anthony Hopkins was one of two actors considered for the role of Captain Bligh by David Lean. The other was Oliver Reed. Hopkins was approached as early as 1978.

In April 1980, when David Lean was still attached, Christopher Reeve was the favourite to play Fletcher Christian. Lean had enjoyed Superman and Katharine Hepburn had recommended Reeve to Lean. "It's not a remake", said Reeve. "The other versions were just remakes of the first movie. This is the true story based on the diaries of those actually on the Bounty and from the trial of the mutineers. It's the best screenplay I've ever read and it would be an honor and a privilege to accept the part of Christian."

Reeve stayed on the project through the change in director. However he dropped out at the last minute and was replaced by Mel Gibson. Gibson was looking for a project after The Night of the Running Man at MGM was cancelled. "I liked the idea they were going to show Bligh and Christian as the young men they were", said Gibson. "I also liked the idea of playing a role that Errol Flynn first attempted."

The role of Peter Heywood (who inspired the character Roger Byam in the Charles Nordhoff and James Norman Hall novel and earlier film versions) was originally intended to be played by Hugh Grant. Tevaite Vernette was spotted at Papeete Airport and offered the female lead Mauatua. She had to be persuaded and only agreed to play the lead once filming began.

== Filming ==
Filming started 25 April 1983. The final script was completed only the day before filming began.

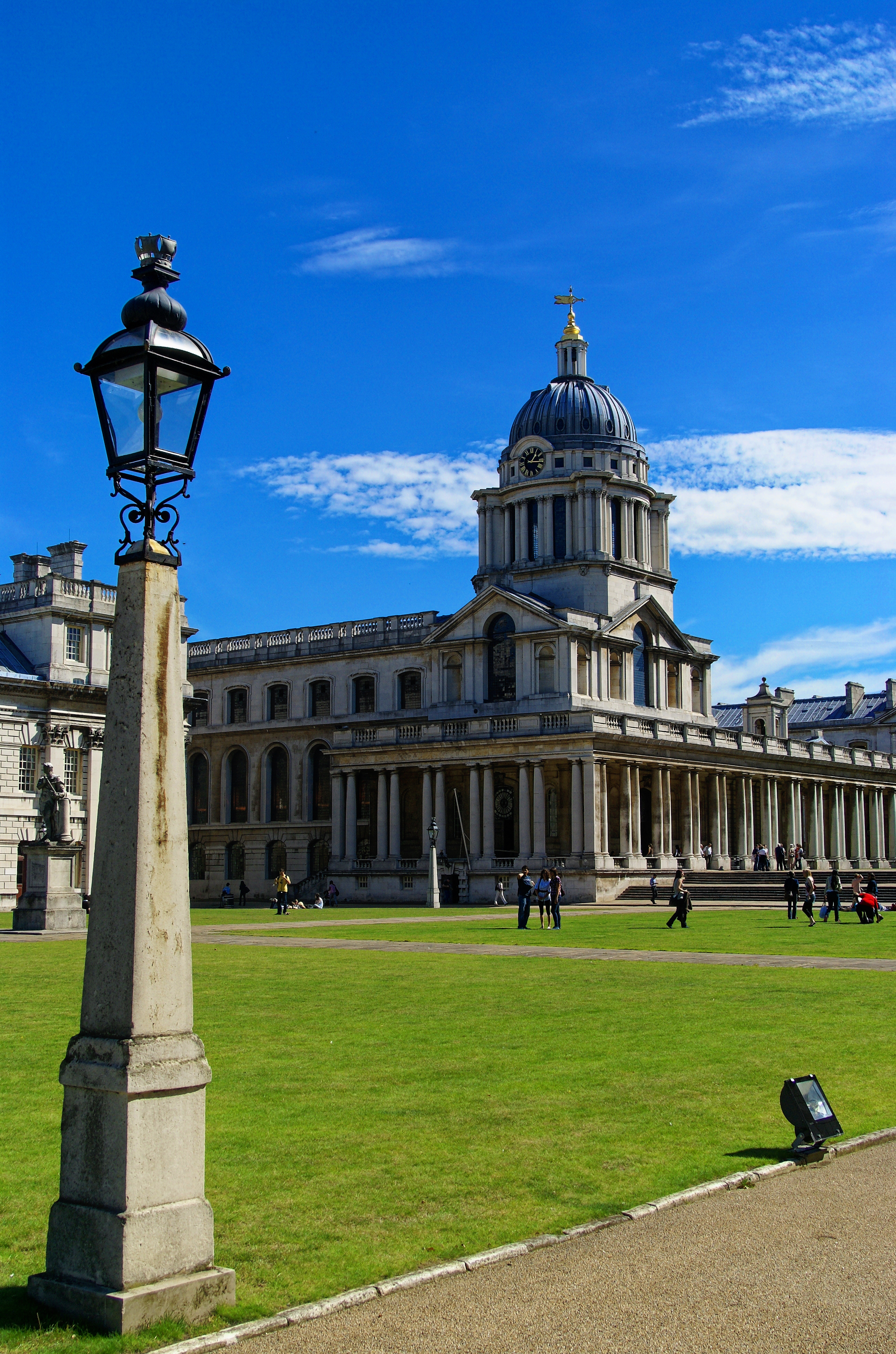
The exterior of the Old Royal Naval College, London was used during Bligh's court martial.

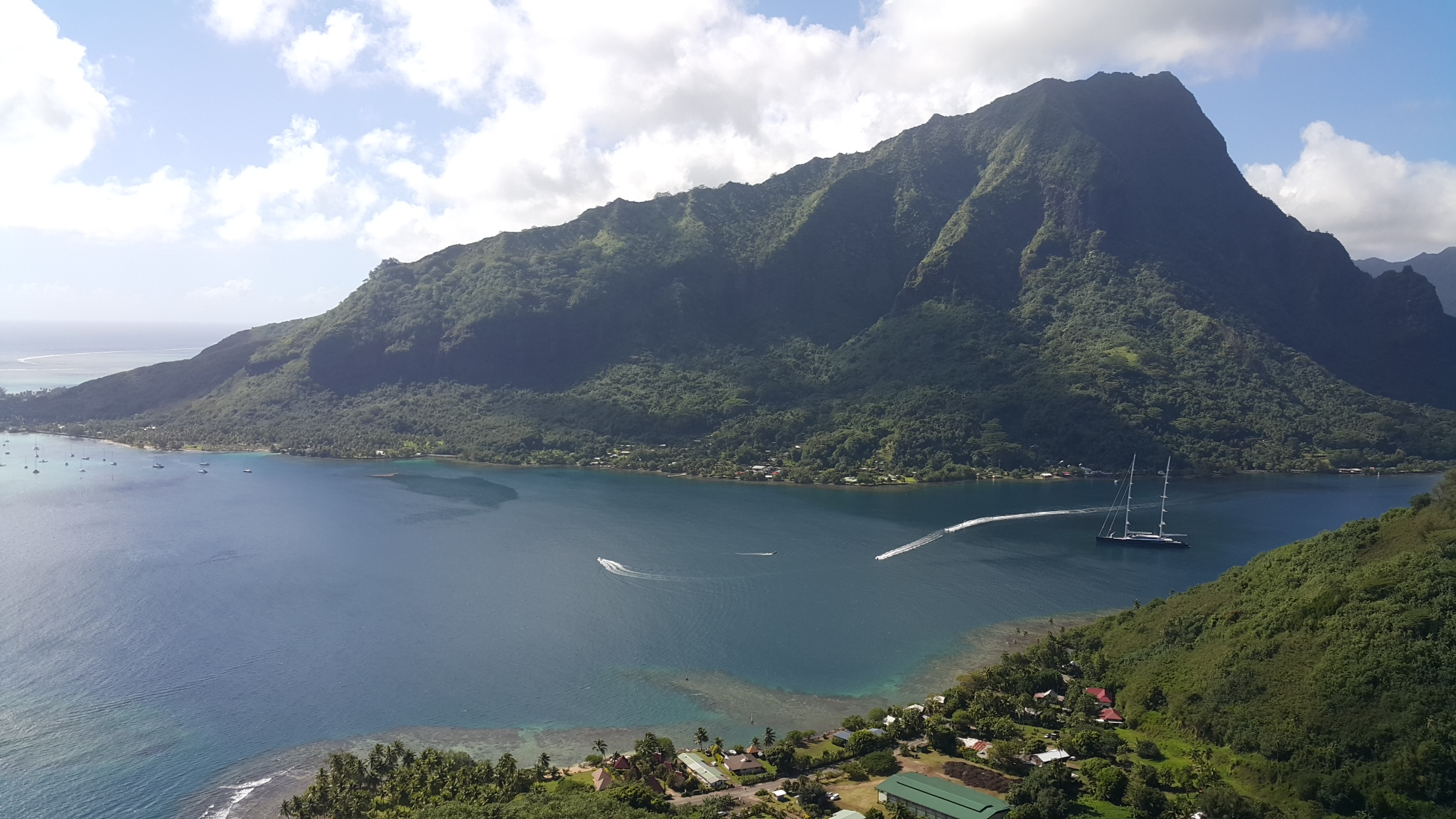
Opunohu Bay, Mo'orea

The film was shot on location over 20 weeks in Mo'orea, French Polynesia, Port of Gisborne, New Zealand and at the Old Royal Naval College and the Reform Club, Pall Mall, London. Many of the shots of the ship were filmed in Opunohu Bay, Mo'orea, the bay where Captain James Cook anchored during 1777. Below-the-deck scenes were shot at Lee Studios outside London.

The replica of the Bounty used in the film was built in Whangārei, New Zealand, before the script was even completed at a cost of $4 million; the entire film cost $25 million. Donaldson said the boat "has got to be the most expensive movie prop ever built. It's exact right down to the hand stitching on the sails."

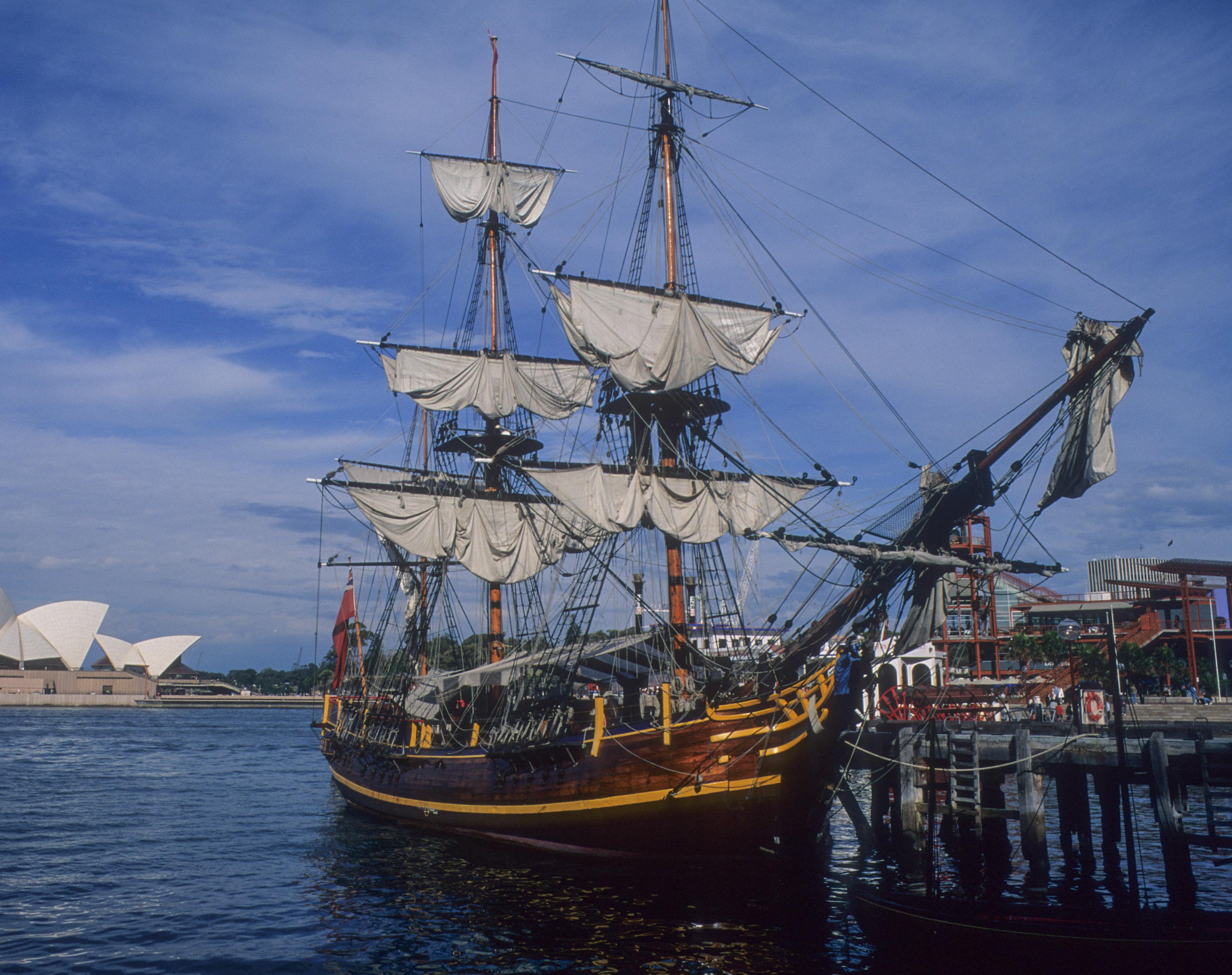
The Bounty used in the film at Sydney Harbour in 1996

The director says filming on the ship was hard. "It's only 90 feet long and its design is archaic. So it rolled all the time and people were constantly seasick. It wasn't a pleasant experience." However, unlike many other films filmed on water, The Bounty was finished under budget.

As well as the New Zealand-built Bounty, Lean had also looked at refitting the frigate Rose to play the role of Pandora. The latter has since gone on to become HMS Surprise in Peter Weir's Master and Commander: The Far Side of the World. For the storm sequences a detailed 25-foot model of the Bounty was built.

Gibson described the making of the film as difficult because of the long production time and bad weather: "I went mad. They would hold their breath at night when I went off. One night I had a fight in a bar and the next day they had to shoot only one side of my face because the other was so messed up. If you see the film, you can see the swelling in certain scenes." Hopkins, who had battled with alcoholism until becoming abstinent in 1975, was worried about Gibson's heavy drinking, saying, "Mel is a wonderful, wonderful fellow with a marvellous future. He's already something of a superstar, but he's in danger of blowing it unless he takes hold of himself." Gibson, who likewise self-identified as an alcoholic, agreed with this concern, and added his admiration for the Welsh actor: "He was terrific. He was good to work with because he was open and he was willing to give. He's a moral man, and you could see this. I think we had the same attitudes."

Donaldson said Hopkins "became Bligh" during filming. "So much so that you didn't want to sit with him at breakfast." Donaldson admits he and Hopkins clashed during filming. "I'm a bit of a hard task-master", admitted Donaldson later. "I won't give up until I really think we've wrung everything we can out of every scene... It was 90 degrees in Tahiti and the humidity was 100%, and Tony was wearing this wool-serge uniform, done up to the neck. That was demanding, just physically."

=== Music ===
The score was composed by Vangelis. The soundtrack has never been officially released, but a two-CD limited edition bootleg was released by One World Music (OWM-95034) in 1995. The score for the tracks "Opening Titles" and "Closing Titles" were remade for the compilation album Themes released in 1989 by Polydor Records.

== Release ==
The Bounty was screened out of competition as the closing film at the 1984 Cannes Film Festival on 23 May. It was released in the United States by Orion Pictures on 4 May 1984 and in the United Kingdom on 5 October 1984 by Thorn EMI Screen Entertainment.

Upon theatrical release in the UK, the film received a 15 certificate rating.

=== Home media ===
The Bounty was released in the US in 1984 and again in 1994 on the LaserDisc format. The film was released as a special-edition DVD in the United Kingdom in March 2002 by Sanctuary with five extra features, including separate audio commentaries, first by the director Roger Donaldson, producer Bernie Williams and production designer John Graysmark and solo commentary by maritime historian Stephen Walters, a fifty-two-minute 'making of' documentary narrated by Edward Fox, The Bounty on Film discussing the various Bounty films, original theatrical trailer and booklet. In the United States Twilight Time released a limited-edition Blu-ray on 10 March 2015 with little in terms of bonus material; however, it features an isolated score track by Vangelis. A special-edition DVD and Blu-ray with the same special features as the 2002 issue was released in Australia by Via Vision Entertainment on 5 December 2018. On 2 January 2019 a Blu-ray was issued in the US and Canada by Kino Lorber Studio Classic with the commentary tracks, Original theatrical trailer and image gallery. Australian label Imprint released a 2-disc Blu-ray box set on 28 June 2023, with a new 4K scan of the negative. Some of the special features included are a new 90-minute featurette of cast and crew interviews, new interview with director Roger Donaldson, new featurette of the score by Vangelis and two archive documentaries titled A Fated Ship surrounding the construction of The Bounty replica and In Bligh's Wake charting the voyage of the replica from New Zealand.

== Historical accuracy ==
The film is generally regarded as more revisionist as well as a more historically accurate depiction of the mutiny than earlier film versions. According to director Donaldson,

"The major difference between our film and the other versions is that none of the others pointed out that Bligh and Christian were friends. They'd made voyages together before they sailed on the Bounty. And while they were on the Bounty, Bligh demoted another officer and promoted Christian, who was at that stage nothing but a midshipman, and made him second in command. What interested me was to explore how their relationship deteriorated from that point to where Christian leads a mutiny against Bligh."

Unlike earlier versions, the film did not portray Bligh as a villain. According to Gibson, "It was a kind of fresh look at Captain Bligh, and I think of all the renditions of who Bligh was, his was probably the closest. His Bligh was stubborn and didn't suffer fools, but he was brilliant and just had a lot of bad luck." Bligh is portrayed as a man who is hot-tempered and foul-mouthed, but only scolds when necessary and is relatively sparing in his punishments, even clearly disliking the order to have his men flogged. On the one hand, he takes his sense of discipline and command too far when scolding Christian about the ship being filthy, exceeding the limits of the ship's company, but after the mutiny, through a return of his good character and leadership qualities, successfully guides his loyalists and their open launch to safety. The Bounty also paints a far less heroic portrait of Christian. In Gibson's description, "Fletcher was just a lad of twenty-two and he behaved like one. The first time he decided to test his horns and fight for the herd, it was a mistake. He shouldn't have done it." Gibson later expressed the opinion that the film did not go far enough in correcting the historical record.

"I think the main problem with that film was that it tried to be a fresh look at the dynamic of the mutiny situation, but didn't go far enough. In the old version, Captain Bligh was the bad guy and Fletcher Christian was the good guy. But really Fletcher Christian was a social climber and an opportunist. They should have made him the bad guy, which indeed he was. He ended up setting all these people adrift to die, without any real justification. Maybe he'd gone island crazy. They should have painted it that way. But they wanted to exonerate Captain Bligh while still having the dynamic where the guy was mutinying for the good of the crew. It didn't quite work."

The film also portrays the sailors exploiting the islanders. Unlike earlier film versions, the native women are shown (accurately) totally bare-breasted. Gibson said, "It was a complete culture shock and it was unbelievable to them. It was paradise in terms of personal freedoms—freedoms that shouldn't have been taken advantage of. They exploited the people, fooled them and didn't tell them the whole truth". Gibson chose to suddenly erupt in violent emotion during the mutiny scene because eyewitness accounts had described Christian as 'extremely agitated' and 'sweating and crying'.

== Reception ==
=== Box office ===
The Bounty grossed $8.6 million in the United States and Canada. In the US and Canada the film grossed $2,622,306 in its opening weekend in 986 theatres. It earned theatrical rentals worldwide of $18.3 million, against a production budget of $20 million.

=== Critical response ===
The film was generally well received by critics, with general praise for the film's realism and historical accuracy as well as Hopkins' performance. On the aggregate site Rotten Tomatoes it has received a 74% rating from 19 critical reviews with an average rating of 6.28/10. The website's critical consensus reads, "Thanks in large part to its cast, and Anthony Hopkins in particular, The Bounty's retelling of the mutiny on HMS Bounty is an intelligent, engaging adventure saga." Roger Ebert gave the film four stars out of four, stating, "this Bounty is not only a wonderful movie, high-spirited and intelligent, but something of a production triumph as well."

However, others were disappointed with the film, especially given its distinguished cast. Many critics singled out Gibson's performance as bland, particularly when compared to the performances given by Clark Gable and Marlon Brando in two earlier adaptations. Vincent Canby of The New York Times stated, "Both Bligh and Christian are unfinished characters in a screenplay that may or may not have been tampered with... The movie seems to have been planned, written, acted, shot and edited by people who were constantly being over-ruled by other people. It's totally lifeless. The film was entered into the 1984 Cannes Film Festival.

Colin Greenland reviewed The Bounty for Imagine magazine, and stated that "By concentrating on the deadlock of the characters and the inevitable explosion, director Roger Donaldson has left many things unexamined: the Tahitians are not allowed to be much more than stereotype happy savages, for example. But his film is a powerful vision of the hell – and the wild beauty – of the high seas."

Anthony Hopkins later said "It was such a sad mess of a film, such a botched job. Yet I'd put so much time and effort into the role. So right then and there I decided: Never again. I will no longer invest so much effort in something over which I have no control. It's too frustrating. That film was a sort of turning point for me. For years I'd been trying to cultivate a don't-give-a-damn attitude. After watching The Bounty I knew I had it." He and Donaldson later worked together on The World's Fastest Indian.

Alex von Tunzelmann of The Guardian gave the film a grade of C, saying: "The Bounty has an incredible cast and a fabulously well-put-together production, and pays impressive attention to historical accuracy – more than any of the previous cinematic recreations. With all this going for it, it's a pity that the drama falls flat."

== See also ==
- Mutiny on the Bounty – 1932 book by Charles Nordhoff and James Norman Hall
- The Mutiny of the Bounty – 1916 film
- In the Wake of the Bounty – 1933 film
- Mutiny on the Bounty – 1935 film by Frank Lloyd
- Mutiny on the Bounty – 1962 film by Lewis Milestone
- List of 1980s films based on actual events
