= Teio (disambiguation) =

Teio (died 1829) was a Tahitian woman who settled on Pitcairn Island with the Bounty mutineers.

Teio may also refer to:

- Teio, the names of the following racehorses:
  - Nippo Teio, a Japanese racehorse born in 1983
  - Legend Teio, a Japanese racehorse born in 1983
  - Tokai Teio, a Japanese racehorse born in 1988
