= Charles Churchill (mutineer) =

British sailor and mutineer (1759–1790)

Charles Churchill (1759–1790) was the master at arms on board HMAV Bounty during Lieutenant William Bligh's voyage to Tahiti to transplant breadfruit to the British colonies in the West Indies. During a mutiny on the ship, Acting Lieutenant Fletcher Christian seized command of the ship from Bligh on 28 April 1789. Churchill was an active member of the mutiny, being a member of Fletcher Christian's loyalists that arrested Bligh in his cabin.

== Early life and navy career ==
Churchill was born in Manchester in 1759. Little else is recorded of his early life in England. Between August and the October of 1787, Bounty's crew was being assigned for the voyage to Tahiti. On 7 September 1787, Churchill signed on as the ships corporal, a task including the assistance of maintaining the order amongst the crew.

== Desertion during Bounty expedition ==
On 5 January 1789 while at Tahiti and three months before departure, three crew members, Charles Churchill, along with the gunner’s mate John Millward and seaman William Muspratt deserted ship, taking the ship's cutter, muskets and ammunition. Muspratt had recently been flogged for neglect of duty.

Bligh records the incident in the ship's log:

"at the relief of the watch at four o'clock this morning the small cutter was missing. I was immediately informed of it and mustered the ship's company, when it appeared that three men were absent: Charles Churchill, the ship's corporal and two of the seamen, William Muspratt and John Millward, the latter of whom had been sentinel from twelve to two in the morning. They had taken with them eight stands of arms and ammunition; but what their plan was, or which way they had gone, no one on board seemed to have the least knowledge."

Among belongings Churchill left on the Bounty included a list of names that Bligh construed as more accomplices in a planned desertion. Bligh later asserted that the names included those of midshipman Peter Heywood and Fletcher Christian. Churchill, Millward and Muspratt were eventually found after three weeks of hiding and, on their return to the ship, were flogged in two sessions with Churchill receiving a dozen lashes, and the others two dozen each.

Churchill and his fellow deserters composed a letter hoping to appease Bligh on return to England and avoid possible fatal consequences on the result of a court martial.

"Sir.

We should think ourselves wholly inexcusable if we omitted taking this earliest opportunity of returning our thanks for your goodness in delivering us from a trial by court martial, the fatal consequences of which are obvious; and although we cannot possibly lay any claim to so great a favour, yet we humbly beg you will be pleased to remit any farther punishment; and we trust our future conduct will fully demonstrate our deep sense of your clemency, and our steadfast resolution to behave better hereafter.

We are, Your most obedient, most humble servants,"

C. Churchill.

Wm. Muspratt,

John Millward.

(Bligh refers to this letter in his reply to Edward Christian's defence of his brother Fletcher)

== During the mutiny and Bligh's description ==
Churchill was one of Fletcher Christian's loyalists who entered Bligh's cabin under arms and forced him on deck on the morning of the mutiny, 28 April 1789.

Bligh describes Churchill in his notebook while cast in Bounty's launch:

[CHARLES CHURCHILL] Ship's Corporal, 30 years, 5 feet 10 inches high. Fair complexion, short light-brown hair. Bald headed, strong made. The forefinger on his left hand crooked, and the hands shows the mark of severe scald. Tattooed in several parts of the body.

—

== On Tahiti and fate ==
When Christian sailed the Bounty to Tahiti for the final time before heading to Pitcairn, Churchill along with 15 other crew members, voted to stay. He had an ally, Vehiatua who was a minor chief of Taiarapu, a part of south east Tahiti, brother in law of the Tahitian King Otoo. Churchill actively participated in the ongoing political conflicts between the island districts, and with weapons acquired from the Bounty, he contributed in changing the relatively non-lethal nature of the disputes between chiefdoms into bloody slaughter.

The rest of Bounty's crew on Tahiti began to organise their lives. Some attempted to build a schooner hoping to sail to the Dutch East Indies to surrender, others settled into Tahitian life and customs. Churchill and fellow crony Matthew Thompson, on the other hand, chose to lead drunken and generally dissolute lives, which ended in the violent deaths of both. Churchill was murdered by Thompson in a quarrel over a stolen musket. Thompson was then in turn killed by Churchill's native friend, a man named Patiri.

== Portrayals ==
Churchill has been portrayed by:

- Pat Flaherty (1935) Mutiny on the Bounty
- Liam Neeson (1984) The Bounty
