= Teio =

Original Pitcairn Island settler

- Born: Tahiti
- Died: 14 March 1829; Pitcairn Island
- Other names: Te'o, Mary, Sore Mummy
- Spouse: John Adams (m. 1825; died 1829)
- Partners: Tahitian man, before c. 1787 (father to Sully); Thomas McIntosh (consort of); William McCoy, d. 1798 (father to Daniel and Kate); John Adams (c. 1804–08, d. c. March 2, 1829, father to George)
- Children: 4: Sully/Sarah (b. circa 1789, with Tahitian partner); Daniel (b. circa 1792, with William); Kate (b. circa 1799, with William); George Adams (b. circa 1804, with John, her partner and later husband)

Teio, also known as Te'o, Mary, and Sore Mummy, (died March 14, 1829) was a Tahitian woman who settled on Pitcairn Island with the Bounty mutineers. Alongside Mauatua and Teraura, she is one of the island's six original matriarchs.

The Tahitian-born Teio's first connection to the Bounty crew was as the consort of Thomas McIntosh, who brought her to Tubuai. McIntosh was a loyalist and did not join the mutineers, remaining in Tahiti. However, Teio sailed with the mutineers to Pitcairn in 1789, although it is unknown whether she went willingly or was brought by force. She brought her daughter with a previous Tahitian partner, a 10-month-old known as Sully, Sarah, or Susannah by the mutineers, to the island, becoming the only woman in the party to arrive with a child.

On Pitcairn, Teio partnered with William McCoy, with whom she had two children: Daniel, born in 1792, and Kate or Catherine, born in 1799. McCoy died by suicide in 1798, shortly before their daughter's birth. Teio remained on the island, and a little over a decade later she began a relationship with John Adams, whose consort Vahineatua had died. Teio and Adams, who were formally married by the visiting Frederick William Beechey in 1825, had one son, George Adams, in 1804.

Teio grew blind later in life, and she died in 1829, less than two weeks after her husband. Hers is one of very few marked graves on the island from this period.

Teio's descendants contributed significantly to the population of Pitcairn: Sarah had eight children with Charles Christian, including Charles Christian II and Fletcher Christian II; Daniel had nine children with Sarah Quintal, including Matthew McCoy; Catherine had nine children with Arthur Quintal I, including Arthur Quintal II; and George had three children with Polly Young.

== See also ==
- Teraura
- Mauatua
