= Petania =

Petania may refer to:

- a late Mangarevan name for Pitcairn Island
- Petania Marae in Taumarunui, New Zealand
