= Mutiny on the Bounty (1935 film) =

1935 film by Frank Lloyd

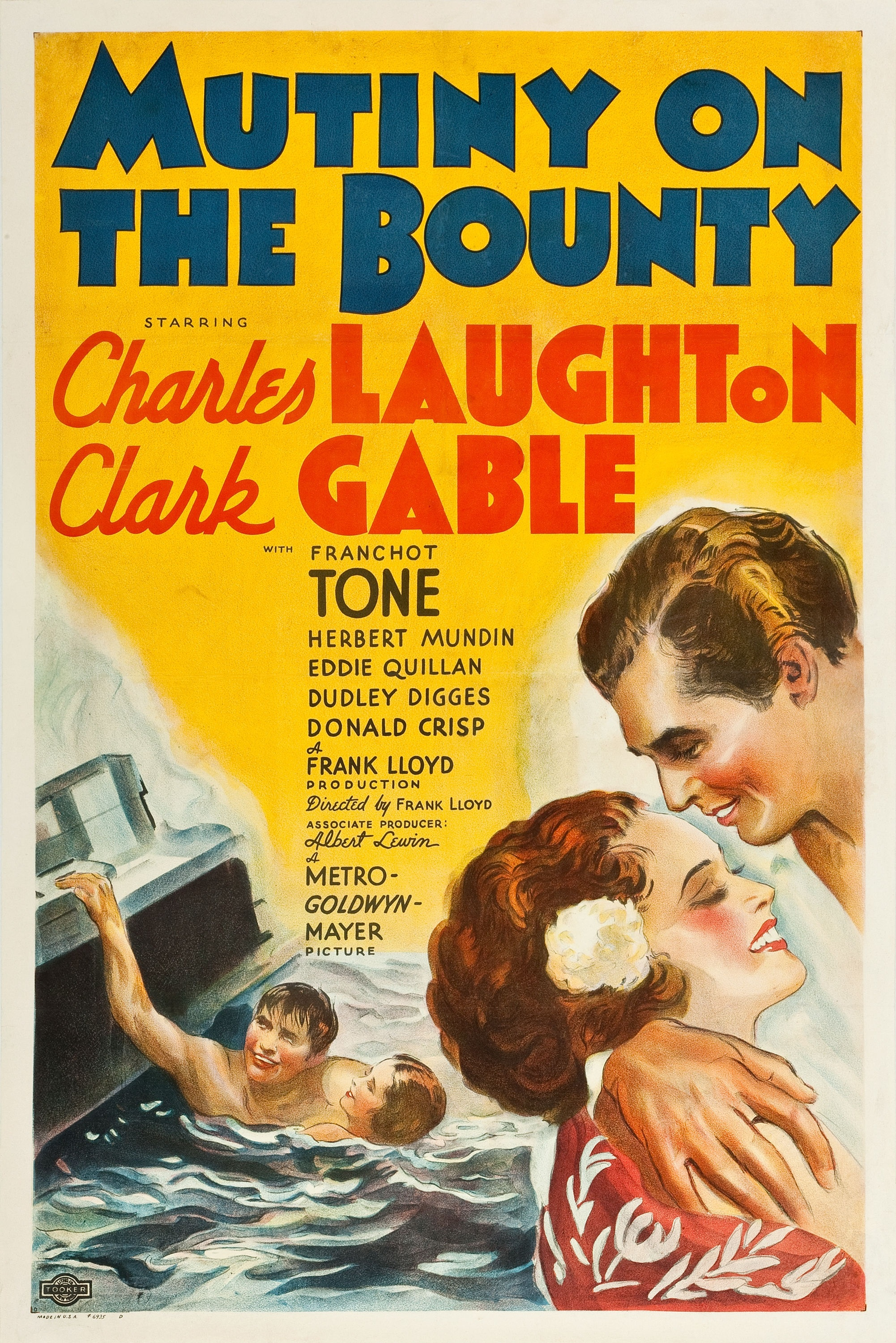
- Theatrical release poster
- Directed by: Frank Lloyd
- Written by: Talbot Jennings; Jules Furthman; Carey Wilson; John Farrow (uncredited)
- Based on: Mutiny on the Bounty (1932 novel) and Men Against the Sea (1933 novel) by Charles Nordhoff; James Norman Hall
- Produced by: Frank Lloyd; Irving Thalberg
- Starring: Charles Laughton; Clark Gable; Franchot Tone; Movita Castaneda; Mamo Clark
- Cinematography: Arthur Edeson
- Edited by: Margaret Booth
- Music by: Herbert Stothart
- Production company: Metro-Goldwyn-Mayer
- Distributed by: Loew's Inc.
- Release date: November 8, 1935
- Running time: 132 minutes
- Country: United States
- Language: English
- Budget: $1.95 million
- Box office: $4.5 million

Mutiny on the Bounty is a 1935 American historical adventure drama film directed by Frank Lloyd and produced by Metro-Goldwyn-Mayer. It dramatizes the mutiny of HMS Bounty, and is adapted from the novels Mutiny on the Bounty and Men Against the Sea by Charles Nordhoff and James Norman Hall. It stars Charles Laughton as William Bligh, Clark Gable as Fletcher Christian, and Franchot Tone as Roger Byam (based on Peter Heywood).

Despite historical inaccuracies, the film was a huge box office success, becoming the highest-grossing film of 1935 and one of MGM's biggest hits of the 1930s. The film was also a major critical success, and received a leading eight nominations at the 8th Academy Awards, winning Best Picture. As of 2026, it is the last Best Picture winner to win in no other category.

== Plot ==
Foreward

In December, 1787, H.M.S. Bounty lay in Portsmouth harbour on the eve of departure for Tahiti in the uncharted waters of the Great South Sea.
The Bounty's mission was to procure breadfruit trees for transplanting to the West Indies as cheap food for slaves.
Neither ship nor breadfruit reached the West Indies. Mutiny prevented it – mutiny against the abuse of harsh eighteenth century sea law. But this mutiny, famous in history and legend, helped bring about a new discipline, based upon mutual respect between officers and men, by which Britain's sea power is maintained as security for all who pass upon the seas.

— Opening scroll

In 1787, William Bligh commands the Royal Naval merchant vessel HMS Bounty. Bligh is a brutal tyrant who routinely administers harsh punishment to officers and crew alike who lack discipline, cause any infraction on board the ship, or defy his authority in any manner. After press ganging a crew out of a local pub, the Bounty sets sail from Portsmouth on a two-year voyage across the Pacific, to transport breadfruit from the Polynesian islands to Jamaica.

Fletcher Christian, the ship's executive officer, is a formidable yet compassionate man who disapproves of Bligh's treatment of the crew. Roger Byam is an idealistic midshipman who is divided between his loyalty to Bligh, owing to his family's naval tradition, and his friendship with Christian.

During the voyage, the enmity between Christian and Bligh grows after Christian openly challenges Bligh's unjust practices aboard the ship. When the ship arrives at the island of Tahiti, where the crew acquires breadfruit plants to take to the West Indies, Bligh punishes Christian by refusing to let him leave the ship during their stay.

Byam, meanwhile, sets up residency on the island and lives with the island chief, Hitihiti, and his daughter, Tehani, and he compiles an English dictionary of the Tahitian language. Hitihiti persuades Bligh to allow Christian a day pass on the island. Bligh agrees, but quickly repeals the pass out of spite. Christian disregards the order and spends his day off the ship romancing a Tahitian girl, Maimiti. Christian promises her he will be back someday.

After leaving Tahiti, the crew begins to talk of mutiny after Bligh's harsh discipline leads to the death of the ship's beloved surgeon, Mr. Bacchus, and Bligh severely cuts water rationing to the crew in favor of providing more water for the breadfruit plants.

Christian, although initially opposing the idea, decides he can no longer tolerate Bligh's brutality when he witnesses crew members shackled in iron chains, and he approves the mutiny. The crew raids the weapons cabinet and seizes the ship. Bligh and his loyalists are cast into a boat and set adrift at sea with a map and rations to ensure their survival. Due to Bligh's steady leadership, they are able to find their way back to land.

Meanwhile, Christian orders that Bounty return to Tahiti. Byam, who was in his cabin during the mutiny, disapproves of what Christian has done and decides the two can no longer be friends.

Months later, Byam is married to Tehani, and Christian has married Maimiti and has a child with her, while the rest of the crew are enjoying their freedom on the island. After a long estrangement, Byam and Christian reconcile their friendship.

No one on the island thought of sleep that night. Watch fires were lighted to await the coming of the strange English ship – Securing all seamen left on the island, Captain Bligh sailed in pursuit of Fletcher Christian. He drove his frigate, the Pandora, on and on through the uncharted and treacherous reefs of the Great South Sea.

— Screen captions (at ~1:48:00 & 1:50:00)

However, when the British ship HMS Pandora is spotted approaching, Byam and Christian decide they must part ways. Byam and several crew members remain on the island for the ship to take them back to England, while Christian leads the remaining crew, his wife, and several Tahitian men and women back on board Bounty in search of a new island on which to seek refuge.

Byam boards Pandora and, much to his surprise, discovers that Bligh is the captain. Bligh, who suspects that Byam was complicit in the mutiny, has him imprisoned for the remainder of the journey across the sea.

Back in England, Byam is court-martialed and found guilty of mutiny. Before the court condemns him, Byam speaks of Bligh's cruel, dehumanizing conduct aboard Bounty. Due to the intervention of his friend Sir Joseph Banks and Lord Hood, Byam is pardoned by King George III and allowed to resume his naval career at sea.

Meanwhile, Christian has found Pitcairn Island, an uninhabited yet sustainable island that he believes will provide adequate refuge from the reach of the Royal Navy. After deliberately crashing Bounty onto the rocks, Christian orders her to be burned to evade detection, planning to settle permanently there.

== Cast ==
- Charles Laughton as Captain William Bligh (Note: In real life, Bligh was a Lieutenant in the Royal Navy, but as captain of a vessel would be regarded and addressed as a Captain, relative to that vessel. In the film, he is only ever referred to as 'Captain'.)
- Clark Gable as Lieutenant Fletcher Christian (Note: In real life, Fletcher Christian was ranked Master's Mate at the start of the voyage, and was appointed Acting Lieutenant midway through the voyage (in March 1788). In the film, he is addressed as Lieutenant throughout the entire voyage.)
- Franchot Tone as Midshipman Roger Byam (based on Peter Heywood)
- Herbert Mundin as John Smith
- Eddie Quillan as Thomas Ellison
- Dudley Digges as Bacchus (Thomas Huggan)
- Donald Crisp as Burkitt
- Henry Stephenson as Sir Joseph Banks
- Francis Lister as Captain Nelson
- Spring Byington as Mrs. Byam
- Movita Castaneda as Tehani
- Mamo Clark as Maimiti (Mauatua)
- Byron Russell as Quintal
- Percy Waram as Coleman
- David Torrence as Lord Hood
- John Harrington as Purcell
- Douglas Walton as Stewart
- Ian Wolfe as Maggs
- DeWitt Jennings as Fryer
- Ivan F. Simpson as Morgan
- Vernon Downing as Hayward
- William Bambridge as Hitihiti (Pōmare I)
- Marion Clayton as Mary Ellison
- Stanley Fields as Muspratt
- Wallis Clark as Morrison
- Crauford Kent as Lt. Edwards
- Pat Flaherty as Churchill
- Alec Craig as McCoy
- Charles Irwin as Thompson
- Dick Winslow as Tinkler

Uncredited

- Harold Entwistle as Captain Colpoys
- Robert Livingston as Young
- Hal LeSueur as Millard
- Harry Allen as Wherryman
- David Niven, James Cagney, and Dick Haymes as Able seamen

== Production ==
The film is based on Mutiny on the Bounty and Men Against the Sea, the first two novels of The Bounty Trilogy written by Charles Nordhoff and James Norman Hall. Director Frank Lloyd purchased the rights to the novel and offered to sell the project to MGM chief Irving Thalberg, on the condition that he be allowed to direct and star, and that the film be shot on-location in Tahiti. Thalberg agreed to let Lloyd direct, but rejected his other demands.

Frank Lloyd and Thalberg undertook extensive research of 18th century British naval customs and archival records pertaining to the actual mutiny, in a bid for his historical authenticity. Lloyd consulted genealogical charts in order to contact and interview living descendants of the original Bounty crew, transcripts of the courts-martial, and also read William Bligh's own memoir A Narrative of the Mutiny on His Majesty's Ship "Bounty".

John Farrow, Robert Hopkins, and Allen Rivkin were uncredited screenwriters on the film.

=== Casting ===
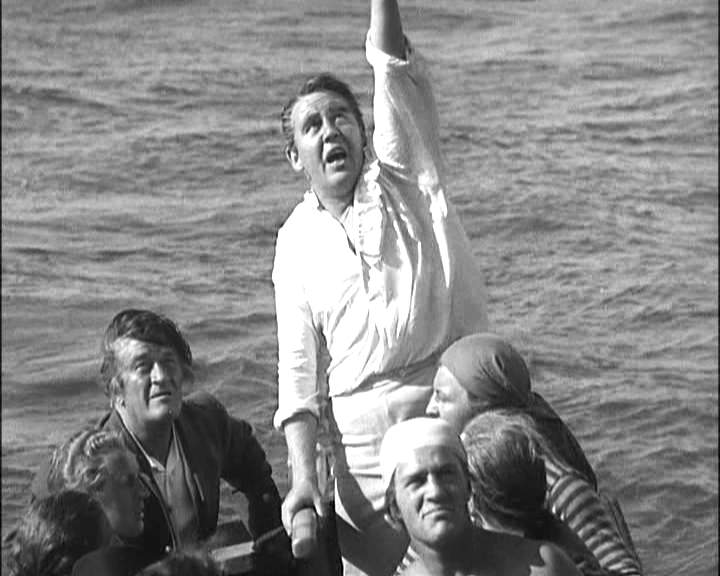
Charles Laughton as Captain Bligh set adrift by Fletcher Christian (Clark Gable).

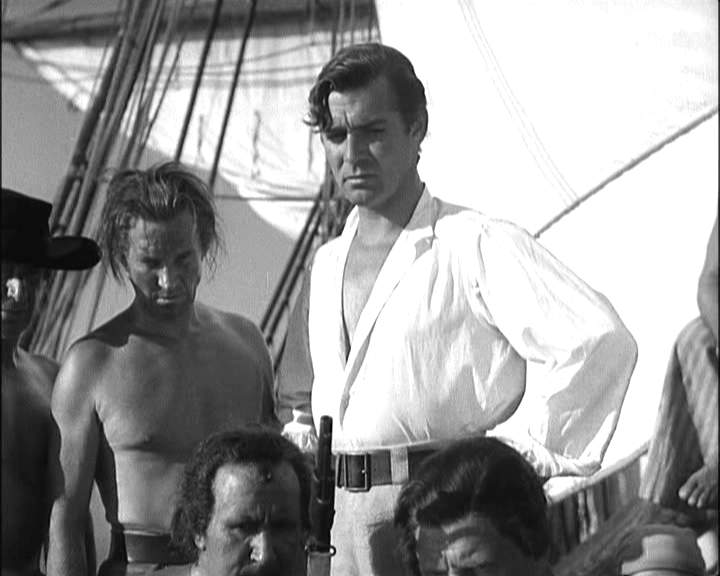
Clark Gable as Fletcher Christian

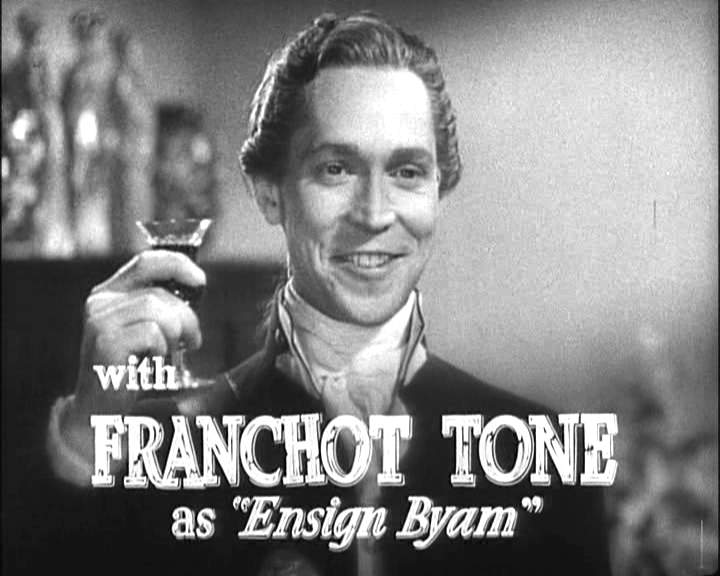
Franchot Tone as Roger Byam in the film's trailer, incorrectly referred to as an ensign.

The film was originally conceived as a starring vehicle for Wallace Beery (as Bligh) and Robert Montgomery (as Byam), but both were replaced before production began.

Clark Gable was initially opposed to playing Christian, since it meant shaving his trademark mustache.

Charles Laughton, who had a severe self-image complex concerning his weight and unattractive looks, suffered horribly in comparing himself to the handsome, masculine Clark Gable. Laughton would constantly watch his own walk, gestures, and face, making sure not to let his complex be projected.

During pre-production, Laughton discovered that Bligh's tailoring establishment still possessed one of Bligh's original transaction records, which contained the price as well as the measurements and type of material of his uniforms. At Laughton's request, the tailor used the records to reproduce Bligh's uniforms.

=== Filming locations ===
- Metro-Goldwyn-Mayer Studios – 10202 W. Washington Blvd., Culver City, California, United States (studio)
- Monterey Bay, Monterey, California, United States
- Monterey Harbor, Monterey, California, United States
- Sailing Ship Restaurant, Pier 42, The Embarcadero, San Francisco, California, United States (ship Ellen as the Bounty)
- San Miguel Island, California, United States
- Santa Barbara Channel, Channel Islands, California, United States
- Santa Catalina Island, Channel Islands, California, United States
- South Beach Harbor, South Beach, San Francisco, California, United States (ship Ellen as the Bounty)
- South Pacific, Pacific Ocean
- Tahiti, French Polynesia

James Cagney (then on a hiatus from Warner Bros. during a contract dispute) and future stars David Niven and Dick Haymes were uncredited extras in the movie. Cagney is clearly visible toward the beginning of the film. He was sailing his boat near where the film was shooting near Catalina Island; director Frank Lloyd was an old friend of his, and Cagney asked him if he could play a small part in the film, saying, jokingly, "I need the money". Lloyd had Cagney dressed in a crewman's clothes and put him in the background of a few scenes.

Second unit camera operator Glenn Strong was killed after a barge the crew was using capsized off San Miguel Island.

=== Ships ===
The ship that starred as the Bounty was built in 1882 as the Lily, by the Dickie Brothers in San Francisco. She was used for filming starting 1920, when an unknown film production was given permission to burn her decks while moored in San Francisco. In July of 1920, the Lily was towed into Newport Harbor, and was cited as the largest ship to have entered the harbor. MGM would purchase the Lily in May of 1927, and she was used in the films The Single Standard (1929), and The Ship from Shanghai (1930). She was sold in 1932 and worked as a salvage vessel. By June of 1934, MGM owned her and conversion to appear as the Bounty was underway.

By 1937 the replica Bounty and Pandora were moored together at the entrance to the Port of Long Beach. By 1939, they were in disrepair. By 1941, they had been moved to a location deeper into the harbor. In 1946, MGM sold the Bounty to F.W. Eaton, who restored the schooner rigging, and anchored her off of Cabrillo Beach, Los Angeles. The August 13, 1950 edition of the Long Beach Press-Telegram reports that sometime after conversion to a fishing barge, the ship had dragged its anchor during a storm, battered herself against the breakwater, and sank.

The Nanuk (replica Pandora) was sold sometime between 1941 and 1946 to the Pacific National Shipping Company of Mexico, where her masts were removed, and Lloyds would lister her working as an oil-powered motor freighter. She would disappear from the Lloyd's register in 1960.

== Historical accuracy ==
The film's screenplay is based largely on the Nordhoff-Hall novels, and contains several historical inaccuracies:

- Captain Bligh was never on board HMS Pandora, nor was he present at the trial of the mutineers who stayed on Tahiti. At the time, he was halfway around the world on a second voyage for breadfruit plants. Fletcher Christian's father had died many years before Christian's travels on board Bounty, whereas the film shows the elder Christian at the trial.
- Bligh is initially depicted as a brutal, sadistic disciplinarian, only becoming more sympathetic during the voyage to Timor. Particular episodes include a keelhauling and flogging a dead man. Neither of these happened. Keelhauling was used rarely, if at all, and had been abandoned long before Bligh's time. Indeed, the meticulous record of Bounty's log reveals that the flogging rate was lower than the average for that time.
- Prior to the mutiny, Bounty had only two deaths. One seaman, James Valentine, died of an ill-defined respiratory illness; logs indicate he was "seized with a violent hollow Cough and spit much." The ship's surgeon, Thomas Huggan, apparently died of complications due to his chronic alcoholism, not as a result of abuse by Bligh. In fact, Bligh had threatened to seize and impound Huggan's alcohol stocks on account of him regularly being intoxicated while on duty, a threat Bligh eventually carried out. Huggan's constant drunkenness left Bligh little choice but to oversee key health issues himself. Notably, the crew had been examined constantly for scurvy, and Bligh – his expertise in this matter developed under Captain James Cook – had detected no verified signs of the illness at any time.
- Likewise, the film shows the mutineers taking over the ship only after killing several loyal crewmen, when in fact none died (although one crewman came very close to shooting Bligh until stopped by Christian).
- Christian is shown being inspired to take over the ship after several crewmen have unjustly been put into irons by Bligh; this is fictional.
- Mutineer Thomas Ellison is depicted as being allowed to see his wife before his execution. There is no record to indicate that the real Ellison was married, and in any case, a consolation visit of this type never would have been permitted in real life.
- In the final scene of the film, Christian gives a rousing speech to his fellow mutineers, speaking of creating a perfect society of free men on Pitcairn, away from Bligh and the navy. The reality was very different as the lower-caste Tahitian men were subjugated by the mutineers, the upper-caste Tahitian men and occasionally the women.

For historical accuracy, Clark Gable reluctantly had to shave off his moustache because the sailors in the Royal Navy in the 18th century had to be clean-shaven. Midshipman Roger Byam was based on a real person, Midshipman Peter Heywood, who is not listed in the novel or motion picture. Just as the fictional Byam is pardoned at the end of the film, the real-life Heywood was pardoned for his part in the mutiny. The trailer for the film made an error calling Midshipman Byam an ensign.

== Reception ==
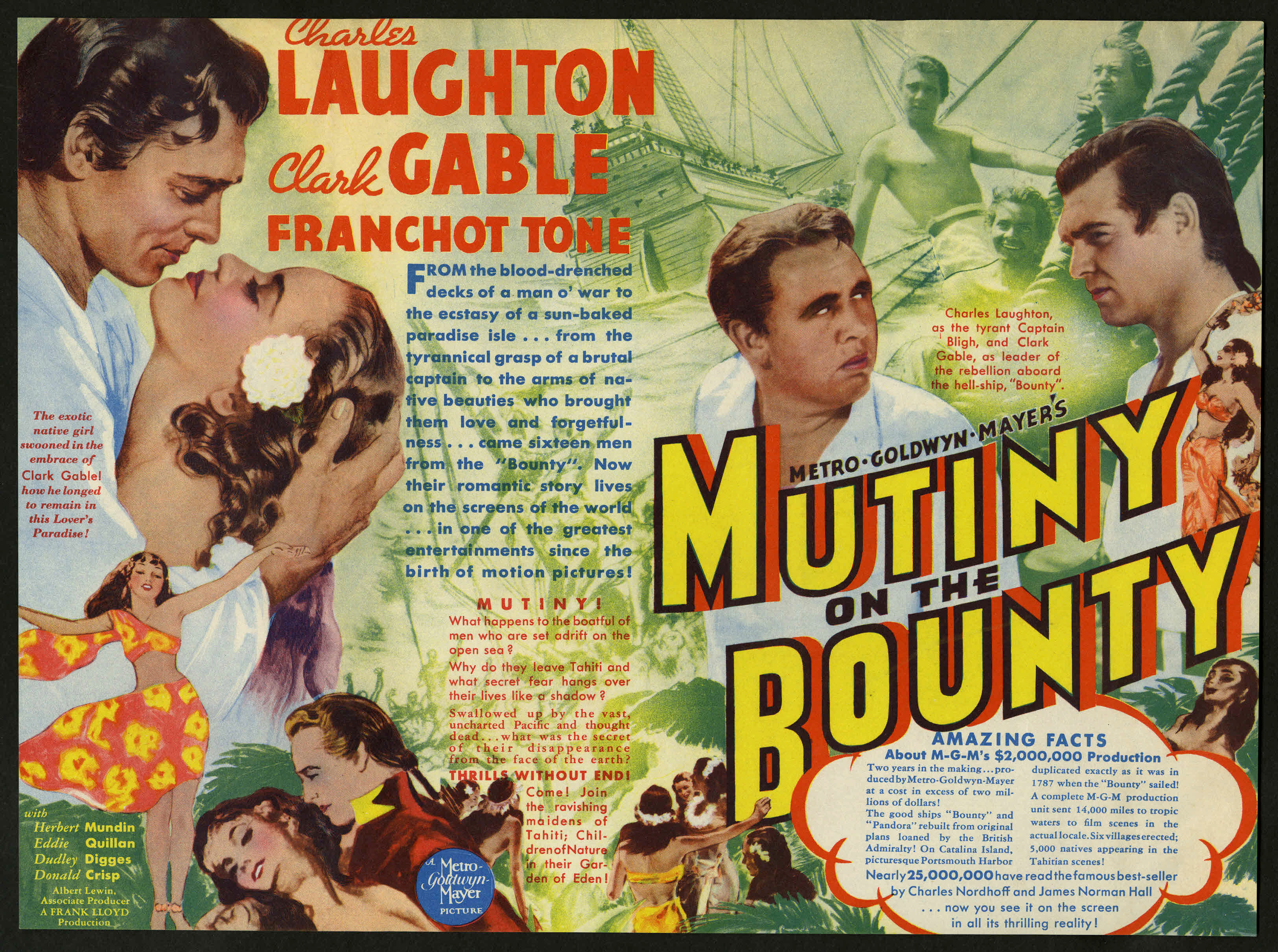
Advertorial poster

Contemporary reviews were enthusiastic. Andre Sennwald of The New York Times wrote, "Grim, brutal, sturdily romantic, made out of horror and desperate courage, it is as savagely exciting and rousingly dramatic a photoplay as has come out of Hollywood in recent years. The Nordhoff-Hall trilogy was, of course, born to be filmed, and Metro-Goldwyn-Mayer has given it the kind of production a great story deserves." The Hollywood Reporter raved that it was "one of the greatest films of all time", with "the epic sweep of the sea itself." Variety called it "Hollywood at its very best. The story certainly could not have been presented as powerfully through any other medium." Film Daily wrote, "This is one of the most important productions since the inception of talking pictures. It is grim, gripping and pictorially perfect." John Mosher of The New Yorker declared that the filmmakers had "done a good, solid, fine job" and wrote that Laughton's performance as Captain Bligh "may not be exactly the image of the original brute, but it's a Laughton masterpiece." Mutiny on the Bounty topped the annual Film Daily poll of 523 critics as the best film released in 1936 (it was released too late in the year to appear on the 1935 ballot).

In a more recent review, Pauline Kael spoke well of the film. "The movie doesn't fall into the usual trap of setting strong heroes against weak, cowardly villains. As Charles Laughton plays him, the corrupt, sadistic Bligh is the strongest person on the screen; it is not merely that Bligh is a great sailor, capable of remarkable feats of navigation, and a man who is defiant even when defiance takes courage---it's that Laughton has a genuinely horrible mad power. . . . For the kind of big budget, studio-controlled romantic adventure that this is, it's very well done."

Rotten Tomatoes reports a 96% approval rating based on 74 reviews, with a weighted average of 8.60/10. The site's consensus reads: "The historical inaccuracies in this high-seas adventure are more than offset by its timeless themes, larger-than-life performances from Clark Gable and Charles Laughton, and Frank Lloyd's superb direction".

=== Box office ===
According to MGM records the film earned $2,250,000 in the US and Canada and $2,210,000 elsewhere resulting in an estimated profit of $909,000.

It was the 3rd most popular film at the British box office in 1935–36.

== Awards and honors ==
=== Academy Awards ===
Mutiny on the Bounty is, as of 2026 and beyond, the last Best Picture winner to win in no other category (following The Broadway Melody and Grand Hotel). It is the only film to have three Best Actor nominations. As a result of this, a Best Supporting Actor category was created for the Oscars, beginning with the following year's awards ceremony.

Ceremony	Award	Nominee	Result
8th Academy Awards	Best Picture	Metro-Goldwyn-Mayer (Irving Thalberg and Frank Lloyd producers)	Won
8th Academy Awards	Best Director	Frank Lloyd	Nominated
8th Academy Awards	Best Actor	Clark Gable	Nominated
8th Academy Awards	Best Actor	Charles Laughton	Nominated
8th Academy Awards	Best Actor	Franchot Tone	Nominated
8th Academy Awards	Best Writing, Screenplay	Jules Furthman, Talbot Jennings, Carey Wilson	Nominated
8th Academy Awards	Best Film Editing	Margaret Booth	Nominated
8th Academy Awards	Best Music, Scoring	Nat W. Finston, Herbert Stothart ("Love Song of Tahiti" written by Walter Jurmann, uncredited)	Nominated

=== Other honors ===
American Film Institute recognition

- AFI's 100 Years... 100 Movies #86
- AFI's 100 Years... 100 Heroes and Villains:
  - Captain Bligh, Villain #19

== Cancelled sequels ==
In 1940 Frank Lloyd was reported as wanting to make a film about the life of Captain Bligh starring Spencer Tracy or Charles Laughton, at Universal. It was never made.

In 1945, it was reported that MGM would make a sequel with Gable, Christian of the Bounty. It would be based on a novel by Charles Nordhoff about Christian's romantic adventures in England and South America following the colonization of Pitcairn Island and would be produced by Carey Wilson. It was never made.

== Other film versions ==
A 1962 three-hour-plus Ultra Panavision 70 and Technicolor remake, starring Marlon Brando as Fletcher Christian and Trevor Howard as Capt. Bligh, was a disaster both critically and financially at the time. Nonetheless, the remake was nominated for a Best Picture Oscar.

In 1984, Mel Gibson played Christian opposite Anthony Hopkins as Bligh in a film (based not upon the Nordhoff-Hall novels but on an historical work by Richard Hough) called The Bounty. This latest version, which gives a far more sympathetic view of Bligh, is considered to be the closest to historical events.

The 1935 version was itself not the first film account of the mutiny. In 1933 an Australian film entitled In the Wake of the Bounty, with the then-unknown Errol Flynn as Fletcher Christian, was released. Flynn noted in his autobiography that whenever he mentioned that he'd played Christian in an Australian version of Mutiny on the Bounty two years before Gable, no one ever believed him. There was also an even earlier, now lost, silent film, the 1916 Australian–New Zealand film, The Mutiny of the Bounty directed by Raymond Longford.

== Parodies ==
- Friz Freleng's cartoon Mutiny on the Bunny casts Yosemite Sam (called Shanghai Sam) as a foul-tempered skipper who shanghais Bugs Bunny, only to see Bugs rebel. Also, in one scene in Freleng's earlier Buccaneer Bunny, Bugs dresses up as Capt. Bligh (including a visual and vocal impression of Charles Laughton) and barks out orders to Sam (called Seagoin' Sam).
- The 1967 Lost in Space episode "Mutiny in Space" features Ronald Long imitating Charles Laughton in the role of spaceship captain "Admiral Zahrk."
- Morecambe and Wise performed a sketch with Arthur Lowe (who played Captain Mainwaring in Dad's Army) as Captain Bligh. At the end of the sketch it is announced Bligh has some loyal crewmen who turn out to be other cast members of Dad's Army.
- "Holidays at Home", a 1978 episode of It Ain't Half Hot Mum, includes a dream sequence where the sitcom's cast enact scenes from the film.
- The Simpsons episode "The Wettest Stories Ever Told" features the family telling stories set on ships. The second segment is a parody on Mutiny on the Bounty and casts Principal Skinner as Capt. Bligh, brutalizing the crew members (played by Bart, Milhouse, Martin, Nelson, Jimbo, Dolph and Kearney).
