= Charles Christian =

Charles Christian may refer to:

- Charles Christian, Prince of Nassau-Weilburg (1735–1788)
- Charles Richard Parkin Christian (1883–1971), politician from Pitcairn
- Charles Christian II (c. 1818–1886), magistrate of Pitcairn Island
- Charlie Christian (Charles Henry Christian, 1916–1942), American swing and jazz guitarist
