= Pitcairn Radio Station =

Radio station located in New Zealand

Coordinates: 25°04′24″S 130°06′19″W

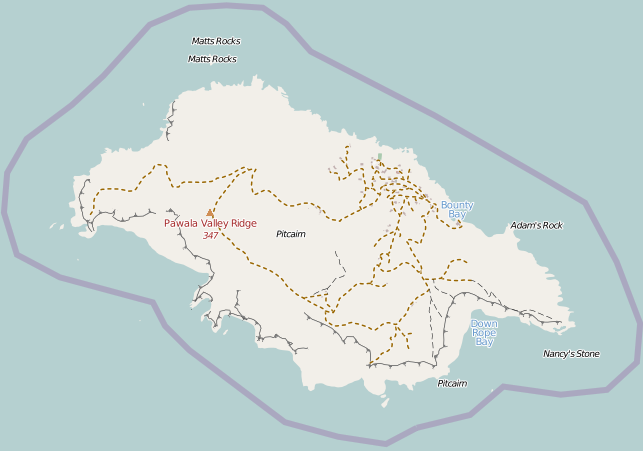
Location on Pitcairn Island

Pitcairn Radio Station was a radio station located at Taro Ground near the southern coast of Pitcairn Island in the south Pacific. It was located on the highest point of the island at 272 metres above sea level. It was used by the New Zealand Meteorological Service, and VP6PAC, the Pitcairn Island Amateur Radio club. Its location was considered for a wind farm to supply the island's population with electricity but this initiative stalled in 2013 when the contractors never delivered.
