= Adamstown Church =

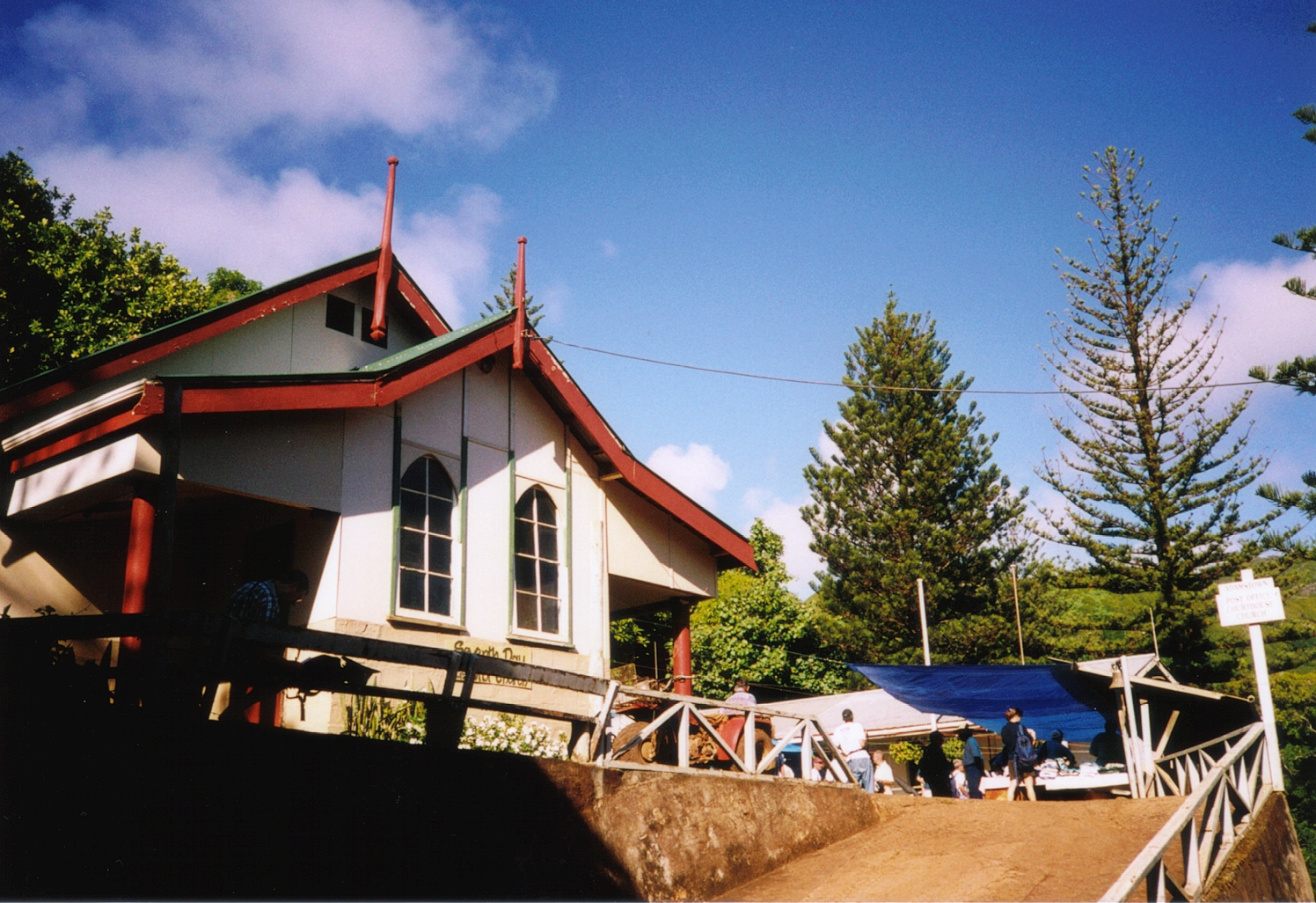

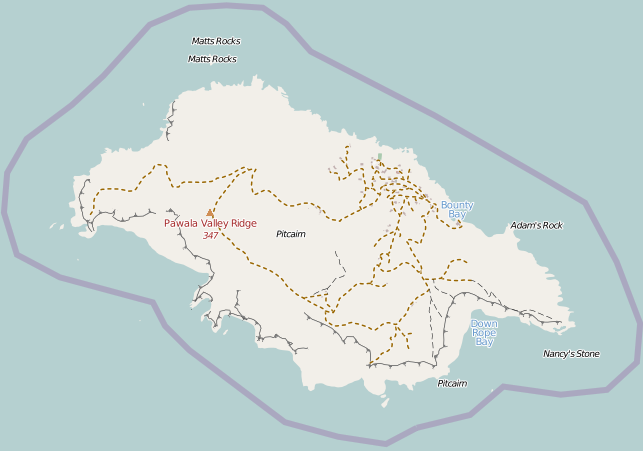
- Location within Pitcairn Island
- 25°03′59″S 130°06′01″W
- Location: Adamstown
- Country: Pitcairn Islands
- Denomination: Seventh-day Adventist

The Adamstown Church, or alternatively Adamstown Adventist Church, is a religious building affiliated with the Seventh-day Adventist Church, located in the town of Adamstown in the Pitcairn Islands, a dependent territory of the United Kingdom in Oceania, at an isolated end of the Pacific Ocean.

== History ==
There has been an Adventist presence in the Pitcairn Islands since 1890 and at a time, almost every inhabitant was an Adventist. The church was constructed around the same time as the Adventists landing after news got back to California in the United States, that the Pitcairn Islanders were receptive to Adventism. The building is located on the main street called "The Square". The church is unique in the entire island of Pitcairn (the only inhabited island of the archipelago) and is the product of a mission sent by American Seventh-Day Adventists who converted almost all of the small number of inhabitants of the island from the Church of England to that Protestant denomination.

In front of the church is a bell that was traditionally rung with the shout of "sail ho!" whenever a ship was sighted from the island. A later Pitcairn Islands law was passed by 1940 that ruled that anyone who falsely called "sail ho!" from the church without a ship being in sight would be fined 5 shillings.

In 2001, due to a decrease in church attendance in the Pitcairn Islands, the Adventist Church in New Zealand's executive committee voted to downgrade Adamstown Church from an officially recognised Adventist church into a company but granted adherents the right to affiliate to other Adventist churches if they wished.

== See also ==
- Seventh-day Adventist Church
- History of the Pitcairn Islands
