= In the Wake of the Bounty =

1933 film

- Directed by: Charles Chauvel
- Written by: Charles Chauvel
- Produced by: Charles Chauvel
- Starring: William Mayne Lynton; Errol Flynn
- Narrated by: Arthur Greenaway
- Cinematography: Tasman Higgins
- Edited by: William Shepherd
- Music by: Lionel Hart
- Production company: Expeditionary Films
- Distributed by: Universal Pictures
- Release date: 15 March 1933
- Running time: 66 minutes
- Country: Australia
- Language: English
- Budget: £6,500
- Box office: £7,000 (Australia)

In the Wake of the Bounty is a 1933 Australian adventure drama film directed by Charles Chauvel about the 1789 Mutiny on the Bounty. It is notable as the screen debut of Errol Flynn, playing Fletcher Christian. The film preceded MGM's more famous Mutiny on the Bounty, starring Charles Laughton and Clark Gable, by two years.

== Plot ==
Chauvel's film uses introductory enacted scenes showing the mutiny, followed by documentary footage, anthropological style, of the mutineers' descendants on Pitcairn Island. Chauvel also used footage of Polynesian women dancers; and film of an underwater shipwreck, filmed with a glass bottomed boat, which he believed was the Bounty but was probably not. This was Chauvel's first 'talkie' and he had clearly at this stage not yet learned to direct actors: the dialogue is very stiff and amateurish. The use of long sections of documentary footage with a voice over, combined with acted scenes, is similar to the hybrid silent and talking pictures that were produced during the transition to sound. It also represents the combination of interests of the director, and he returned to documentary toward the end of his career with the BBC television series Walkabout. Despite the poorly written dialogue, the documentary sections retain their excellence. A return to enactments at the end of the film, with one scripted modern scene in which a child suffers because of the lack of regular ship visits which could have taken the child to hospital, probably sought to make the film a useful voice for the Pitcairn Island community, who had been generous with their participation.

The film mixed re-enactments with documentary, and focused not so much on the mutiny itself as on its consequences.

== Cast ==
- Mayne Lynton as Lieut. Bligh
- Errol Flynn as Fletcher Christian
- Victor Gouriet as Michael Byrne – The Bounty's blind fiddler
- John Warwick as Midshipman Young

== Production ==
There was at least one other film of the Bounty story prior to Chauvel's film, by Australians Raymond Longford and Lottie Lyell, The Mutiny of the Bounty (1916), filmed in New Zealand. This film was to be the first of a series of travel adventures to be made by Chauvel for his new company, Expeditionary Films.

=== Documentary filming ===
In March 1932, Chauvel left Australia with his wife Elsa and cameraman Tasman Higgins and sailed to Pitcairn Island. They were there for three months shooting footage under sometimes extremely dangerous conditions, having to travel around the coast in whaleboats and climb up cliffs on ropes. They then joined a passing boat and went to Tahiti where they spent two months filming more footage.

Chauvel and his crew returned to Sydney in September. His unedited footage was confiscated by the Customs Department and viewed by the censors. They requested cuts of scenes of bare-breasted Tahitian dancers. Chauvel protested and succeeded in having the footage released to him uncut, subject to a censorship review after the completion of the film.

In October 1932 Chauvel registered a script The Story of Pitcairn Island.

=== Errol Flynn ===
The re-enactment scenes were shot on sets built at the studio of Cinesound Productions in Bondi.

There are different stories how Errol Flynn was cast. According to one, Chauvel saw his picture in an article about a yacht wreck involving Flynn. The most common one is he was discovered by cast member John Warwick. His wage has been variously quoted as £3/10 a week or £10 a week.

Flynn would later claim to be descended from Bounty mutineers, however there is no evidence that supports that he was a descendant of the mutineers. According to Filmink in the fina film Flynn is "tall, handsome and all that, but is incredibly awkward, clearly unsure how to stand, where to put his hands or how to deliver lines. In his defence, he’d done nil acting before this."

== Censorship issues ==
When the film was submitted to the censors, they objected to several scenes, including those with bare breasts and depictions of floggings. Chauvel protested that the dancing scenes were supervised by a Methodist clergyman. Chauvel announced he would appeal and was successful in getting the film passed after a compromise version was agreed upon. Chauvel had criticised the censors so much that the Minister for Customs was moved to defend them.

== Release ==
The movie was released by Universal Pictures, whose Australian managing director, Herc McIntyre, became an important supporter of Chauvel throughout the director's career. It was described as a "middle grade" success at the box office.

Everyones reported the premiere premiere at the Prince Edward Theatre "was, as far as the personnel of the audience was concerned, one of the most brilliant the Prince Edward has known for many months. The aftermath is unhappy. The house is not doing the business anticipated ; the producer contends that the supporting show is to blame; the management retoi'ts that the picture, despite early favorable judgment, is not proving of Prince Edward calibre."

=== Critical ===
Critical opinion was generally positive about the documentary footage but not the dramatic scenes. Variety called it "a splendid travelog lengthetled out to feature length by the addition of some rather patchy acting... photography is the highlight."

According to Filmink magazine the movie:

Manages the considerable feat of turning one of the great sagas of maritime history into a barely watchable slog. It’s worth seeing today for Flynn completists and stunning footage of Pitcairn Island. The documentary scenes are fascinating, although watching it now with all we know about Pitcairn you can’t help thinking “those girls probably started having sex when they were twelve”. The dramatic sequences are pure amateur hour, like watching a small town community theatre production; Flynn’s physicality is awkward, he is uncomfortable even standing around, and his acting is all over the shop… but you can see why he was cast – he’s already got the profile, the voice, and flashes of the charisma.

== Sale of footage ==
In 1935, some of the documentary scenes from Chauvel's film were bought by MGM and re-edited into trailers for the 1935 Hollywood film about the mutiny, as well as for two short promotional travelogues, Pitcairn Island Today (1935) and Primitive Pitcairn (1936). It was thought this was done in part to stop the film competing with Mutiny on the Bounty.

== See also ==
- Cinema of Australia
- Nudity in film
