= Lost and Found: The Story of Cook's Anchor =

1979 documentary by David Lean

- Written by: Robert Bolt; David Lean; Wayne Tourell
- Directed by: David Lean
- Country of origin: New Zealand
- Original language: English

Production
- Producers: George Andrews; Wayne Tourell
- Cinematography: Eddie Fowlie; Ken Dorman
- Editor: David Reed
- Running time: 40 minutes
- Production company: Faraway Productions

Original release
- Network: South Pacific Television
- Release: 1979

Lost and Found: The Story of Cook's Anchor, also known as Lost and Found: The Story of an Anchor, is a 1979 New Zealand documentary television film directed and co-written by David Lean which also marked his only television film project.

== Plot ==
Filmmaker David Lean is scouting locations in Tahiti for a feature film about the famous mutiny on HMS Bounty. His property master, Eddie Fowlie, discovers the whereabouts of an anchor which had belonged to Captain James Cook, and historians and experts arrive to examine it before an attempt is made to raise it and bring it to land.

== See also ==
- The Bounty (1984 film)
