= Adamstown, Pitcairn Islands =

Capital, the largest, and only city of the Pitcairn Islands

Adamstown Adamstaun (Pitkern)
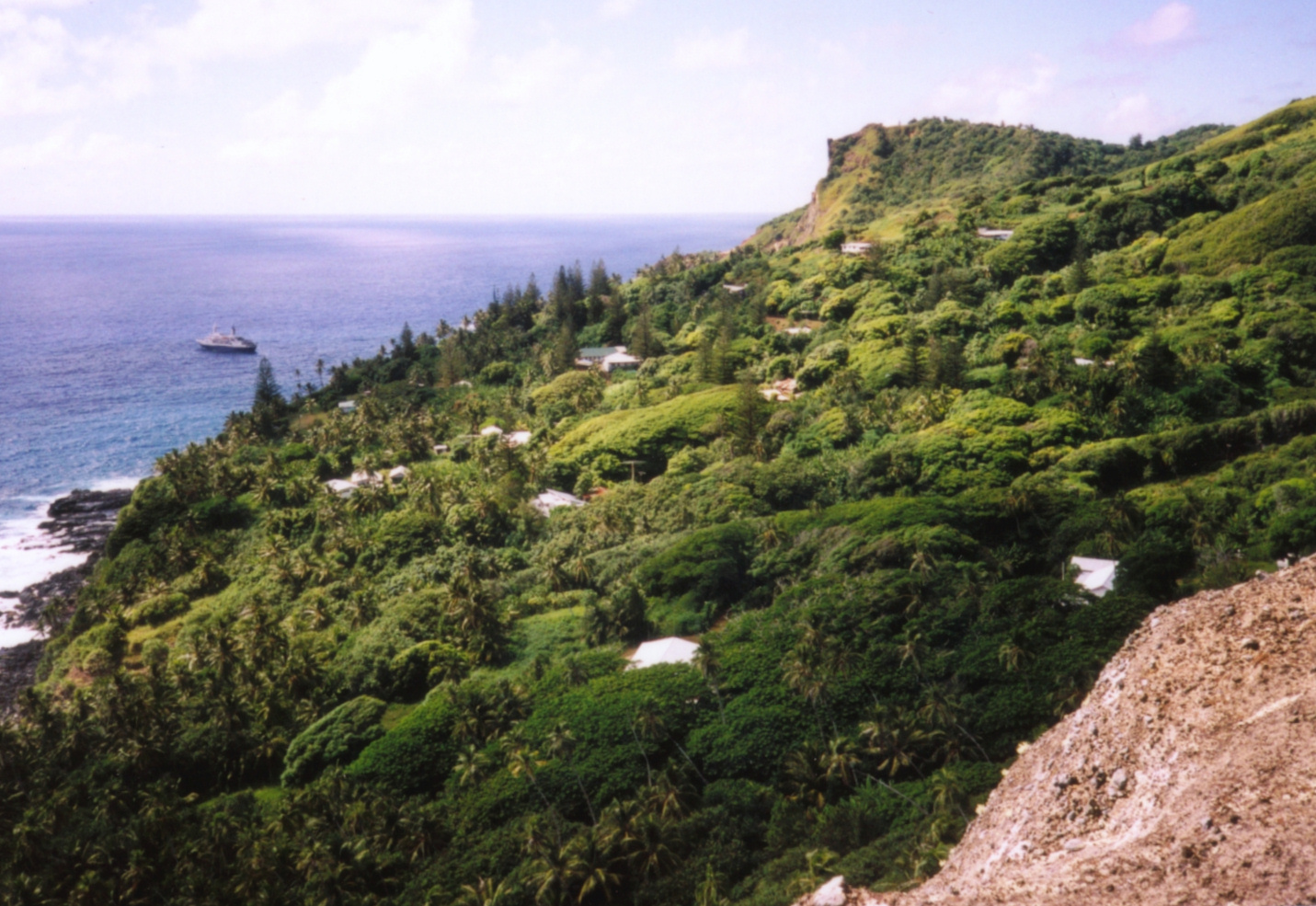
- View of Adamstown

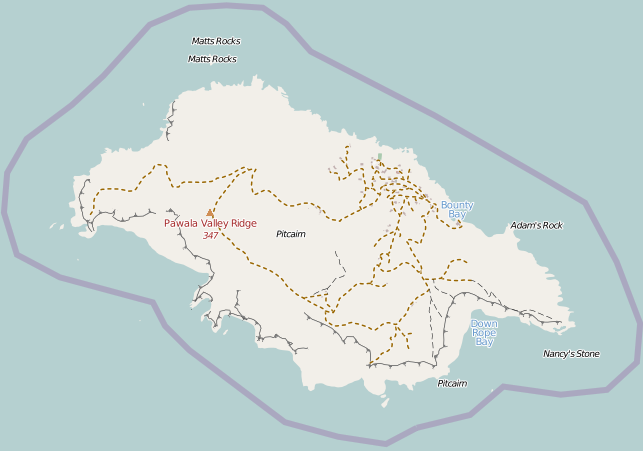
- Location within Pitcairn Island Location within Pacific Ocean
- Coordinates: 25°4′S 130°6′W
- Overseas territory: Pitcairn Islands
- Sovereign State: United Kingdom
- Island: Pitcairn

Government
  - Type: No local government. Administered by government of the Pitcairn Islands
  - Mayor of the Pitcairn Islands: Shawn Christian

Area
  - Total: 4.6 km^{2} (1.8 sq mi)
  - Land: 4.6 km^{2} (1.8 sq mi)
- Elevation: 330 m (1,080 ft)

Population (2023)
  - Total: 35
  - Density: 7.6/km^{2} (20/sq mi)
- Time zone: UTC−08:00
- Climate: Tropical rainforest climate (Af)

Adamstown (Pitkern: Adamstaun) is the capital and only settlement of the Pitcairn Islands, the only British Overseas Territory that is located in the southern Pacific Ocean.

As of 2023, Adamstown has a population of 35, which is the entire population of the Pitcairn Islands. All the other islands in the group are uninhabited. Adamstown is where all residents live, while they grow food in other areas of the island.

Adamstown is the third-smallest capital in the world by population. It has access to television, satellite Internet and a telephone; however, the main means of communication remains ham radio. The "Hill of Difficulty" connects the island's jetty to the town.

== History ==
The history of the Pitcairn Islands begins with the settlement of the islands by Polynesians in the 11th century. The Polynesians established a culture that flourished for four centuries and then vanished. Pitcairn was settled again in 1790 by a group of British mutineers on HMS Bounty and Tahitians. Adamstown is named for the last surviving mutineer, John Adams.

== Geography ==
The settlement is located on the central-north side of the island of Pitcairn, facing the Pacific Ocean and close to the Bounty Bay, the only seaport of the island.

=== Climate ===
Adamstown has a tropical rainforest climate (Af) under the Köppen climate classification system. The hamlet features a wet, very warm climate averaging 1,543 mm (60.74 in) of rain a year. The wettest month is December and temperatures do not vary significantly throughout the year.

Climate data for Pitcairn Island (1972–2004)
Month	Jan	Feb	Mar	Apr	May	Jun	Jul	Aug	Sep	Oct	Nov	Dec	Year
Record high °C (°F)	31.2 (88.2)	32.4 (90.3)	33.3 (91.9)	30.7 (87.3)	29.1 (84.4)	31.3 (88.3)	26.7 (80.1)	26.7 (80.1)	25.5 (77.9)	27.8 (82.0)	27.6 (81.7)	29.3 (84.7)	33.3 (91.9)
Mean daily maximum °C (°F)	25.7 (78.3)	26.2 (79.2)	26.1 (79.0)	24.6 (76.3)	22.9 (73.2)	21.7 (71.1)	20.8 (69.4)	20.6 (69.1)	21.0 (69.8)	21.8 (71.2)	22.9 (73.2)	24.2 (75.6)	23.2 (73.8)
Daily mean °C (°F)	23.3 (73.9)	23.8 (74.8)	23.8 (74.8)	22.5 (72.5)	20.9 (69.6)	19.7 (67.5)	18.8 (65.8)	18.5 (65.3)	18.8 (65.8)	19.6 (67.3)	20.7 (69.3)	22.0 (71.6)	21.0 (69.9)
Mean daily minimum °C (°F)	21.0 (69.8)	21.4 (70.5)	21.5 (70.7)	20.3 (68.5)	18.9 (66.0)	17.8 (64.0)	16.9 (62.4)	16.5 (61.7)	16.6 (61.9)	17.4 (63.3)	18.6 (65.5)	19.8 (67.6)	18.9 (66.0)
Record low °C (°F)	16.9 (62.4)	18.0 (64.4)	12.8 (55.0)	15.0 (59.0)	14.2 (57.6)	11.7 (53.1)	11.4 (52.5)	11.6 (52.9)	10.0 (50.0)	10.2 (50.4)	13.0 (55.4)	13.5 (56.3)	10.0 (50.0)
Average precipitation mm (inches)	96.5 (3.80)	132.7 (5.22)	107.8 (4.24)	114.8 (4.52)	111.9 (4.41)	152.8 (6.02)	139.0 (5.47)	131.6 (5.18)	134.5 (5.30)	143.0 (5.63)	120.4 (4.74)	157.7 (6.21)	1,542.7 (60.74)
Source 1: NOAA
Source 2: KNMI (precipitation)

== Government ==
The Present Committee on Geographic Names stated that Auckland, New Zealand is the administrative centre for these islands because the Governor of Pitcairn, the British High Commissioner to New Zealand, is based in Auckland. However, the same cited document describes Adamstown as the capital of the BOT on the following page.

== Personalities ==
- Ned Young (1762–1800)
- Fletcher Christian (1764–1793)
- John Adams (1768–1829)
- Joshua Hill (1773–1844?)
- Thursday October Christian (1790–1831)
- Steve Christian (b. 1951)
- Brenda Christian (b. 1953)
- Meralda Warren (b. 1959)

== Religion ==
- Adamstown Church

== See also ==
- Bounty Bible
- HMS Bounty
- Island Council of Pitcairn
- 2004 Pitcairn Islands sexual assault trial
- List of rulers of the Pitcairn Islands
