= Quintrell =

Quintrell is an English surname originally from Cornwall, where it appeared after the Norman conquest of 1066 as the anglicisation of either the old French name Cointerel or – less likely – a toponymic surname derived from the French place name Chantarel. Notable people with this name include:

- Mary Corinne Quintrell (1839–1918), English-born American educator and clubwoman
- Robert Quintrell (1931–1983), Canadian cricketer
- Sarah Quintrell, English writer and actress
- Will Quintrell (1880–1946), Australian jazz band leader

== See also ==
- Quintrell Downs, village in Cornwall, England, United Kingdom
