= Charles Christian II =

Pitcairn Island politician

Charles Christian, Jr. (c. 1818 - 22 May 1886) served as Magistrate of the British Overseas Territory of Pitcairn Island in 1847. He was the son of Charles Christian and Sully. He married Charlotte Quintal and had 16 children. Christian died on Norfolk Island.
