= Complement of HMS Bounty =

Crew of HMS Bounty during the 1789 mutiny

c. 1776 portrait of HMS Bounty's commander Lieutenant William Bligh

The complement of HMS Bounty, the Royal Navy ship on which a historic mutiny occurred in the south Pacific on 28 April 1789, comprised 46 men on its departure from England in December 1787 and 44 at the time of the mutiny, including her commander Lieutenant William Bligh. All but two of those aboard were Royal Navy personnel; the exceptions were two civilian botanists engaged to supervise the breadfruit plants Bounty was tasked to take from Tahiti to the West Indies. Of the 44 aboard at the time of the mutiny, 19 (including Bligh) were set adrift in the ship's launch, while 25, a mixture of mutineers and detainees, remained on board under Fletcher Christian. Bligh led his loyalists 3,500 nautical miles (6,500 km; 4,000 mi) to safety in the open boat, and ultimately back to England. The mutineers divided—most settled on Tahiti, where they were captured by HMS Pandora in 1791 and returned to England for trial, while Christian and eight others evaded discovery on Pitcairn Island.

The Admiralty rated Bounty as a cutter, the smallest category of warship—this meant that she was commanded not by a captain but by a lieutenant, with no other commissioned officers aboard, and without the usual detachment of Royal Marines that ships' commanders could use to enforce their authority. Directly beneath Bligh in the chain of command were his warrant officers, appointed by the Navy Board and headed by the sailing master John Fryer. The other warrant officers were the boatswain, the surgeon, the carpenter, and the gunner. Two master's mates and two midshipmen were rated as petty officers; to these were added several honorary midshipmen—so-called "young gentlemen" who aspired to naval careers. They signed on the ship's roster as able seamen, but were quartered with the midshipmen and treated on equal terms with them.

Most on Bounty were chosen by Bligh, or were recommended to him. However, a draft list of the crew before the voyage includes several who did not sail, including two pressed men who are thought to have deserted. Of the eventual crew, William Peckover, the gunner, and Joseph Coleman, the armourer, had been with Bligh when he was Captain James Cook's sailing master on HMS Resolution during the explorer's third voyage (1776–80). Several others had sailed under Bligh more recently, including Christian, who had twice voyaged with Bligh to the West Indies on the merchantman Britannia. The two had formed a master-pupil relationship through which Christian had become a highly skilled navigator; Bligh gave him one of the master's mate's berths on Bounty, and in March 1788, promoted him to the rank of Acting Lieutenant, effectively making Christian second-in-command. Another of the young gentlemen recommended to Bligh was 15-year-old Peter Heywood, a Manxman and a distant relation of Christian's. His recommendation came from Bligh's father-in-law, who was a Heywood family friend.

The two botanists, or "gardeners", were chosen by Sir Joseph Banks, the president of the Royal Society and the expedition's chief promoter. The chief botanist, David Nelson, was another veteran of Cook's third voyage and had learned some of the Tahitians' language. Nelson's assistant, William Brown, was a former midshipman who had seen naval action against the French. Banks also helped to secure the midshipmen's berths for two of his protégés, Thomas Hayward and John Hallett. Overall, Bounty's crew was relatively youthful, the majority being under 30. At the time of departure Bligh was 33 years old and Fryer a year older. Among the older crew members were the gunner, William Peckover, who had sailed on all three of Cook's voyages, and Lawrence Lebogue, formerly sailmaker on the Britannia. The youngest aboard were Hallett and Heywood, who were both 15 when they left England.

== Complement ==
Name	Rank or function	Loyalist or mutineer	Activity post-mutiny	Fate
William Bligh	Lieutenant, Royal Navy: Ship's captain	—	Open boat voyage	Safe return: died 1817
John Fryer	Warrant officer: Sailing master	Loyalist	Open boat voyage	Safe return: died 1817
William Cole	Warrant officer: Boatswain	Loyalist	Open boat voyage	Safe return; died Royal Navy Hospital March 1833
William Peckover	Warrant officer: Gunner	Loyalist	Open boat voyage	Safe return; died May 1819
William Purcell	Warrant officer: Carpenter	Loyalist	Open boat voyage	Safe return; died 1834 Last known survivor of the Bounty Crew
Thomas Huggan	Ship's surgeon	—	—	Died in Tahiti before mutiny 1788
Fletcher Christian	Master's mate Acting lieutenant from March 1788	Mutineer	Sailed to Pitcairn	Murdered on Pitcairn, 1793
William Elphinstone	Master's mate	Loyalist	Open boat voyage	Died in Batavia, 1789
Thomas Ledward	Surgeon's mate	Loyalist	Open boat voyage	Died en route home from Batavia, c. 1789
John Hallett	Midshipman	Loyalist	Open boat voyage	Safe return, died 1794
Thomas Hayward	Midshipman	Loyalist	Open boat voyage	Safe return, died 1797/98
Peter Heywood	Honorary midshipman	Disputed	Settled Tahiti	Captured, convicted, pardoned; rose to Post Captain Royal Navy died 1831
George Stewart	Honorary midshipman	Disputed	Settled Tahiti	Captured, drowned on Pandora 1791
Robert Tinkler	Honorary midshipman	Loyalist	Open boat voyage	Safe return; rose to Captain Royal Navy and died Sept 11,1820
Edward "Ned" Young	Honorary midshipman	Mutineer	Sailed to Pitcairn	Took no active part in mutiny yet joined it after it was over; died on Pitcairn, 1800
Peter Linkletter	Quartermaster	Loyalist	Open boat voyage	Died in Batavia, 1789
John Norton	Quartermaster	Loyalist	Open boat voyage	Killed in attack on open boat at Tofua May 2, 1789
George Simpson	Quartermaster's mate	Loyalist	Open boat voyage	Safe return, died at sea 1801
James Morrison	Boatswain's mate	Disputed	Settled Tahiti	Captured, convicted, pardoned, died at sea 1807
John Mills	Gunner's mate	Mutineer	Sailed to Pitcairn	Murdered on Pitcairn, 1793
Charles Norman	Carpenter's mate	Loyalist (detained)	Settled Tahiti	Captured, tried, acquitted; died December 1793
Thomas McIntosh	Carpenter's mate	Loyalist (detained)	Settled Tahiti	Captured, tried, acquitted; reported to have gone into Merchant marine service.
Lawrence Lebogue	Sailmaker	Loyalist	Open boat voyage	Safe return. died Royal Navy service 1795
Charles Churchill	Master-at-arms	Mutineer	Settled Tahiti	Murdered in Tahiti, c. 1790
Joseph Coleman	Armourer	Loyalist (detained)	Settled Tahiti	Captured, tried, acquitted; last record: discharged from HMS Director (1784) to Yarmouth Hospital ship November 1796
John Samuel	Captain's clerk	Loyalist	Open boat voyage	Safe return. Became Royal Navy paymaster and died on an unknown date prior to 1825.
John Smith	Captain's servant	Loyalist	Open boat voyage	Safe return; died unknown date prior to 1825
Henry Hillbrant	Cooper	Mutineer	Settled Tahiti	Captured, drowned on Pandora 1791
Thomas Hall	Cook	Loyalist	Open boat voyage	Died in Batavia, 1789
Robert Lamb	Butcher	Loyalist	Open boat voyage	Died in Batavia, 1789
William Muspratt	Assistant cook	Mutineer	Settled Tahiti	Captured, convicted, pardoned, died Royal navy service 1797
Thomas Burkett	Able seaman	Mutineer	Settled Tahiti	Captured, convicted, executed
Michael Byrne (or "Byrn")	Able seaman – musician	Loyalist (detained)	Settled Tahiti	Captured, tried, acquitted
Thomas Ellison	Able seaman	Mutineer	Settled Tahiti	Captured, convicted, executed
William McCoy (or "McKoy")	Able seaman	Mutineer	Sailed to Pitcairn	Died on Pitcairn, c. 1798
Isaac Martin	Able seaman	Mutineer	Sailed to Pitcairn	Murdered on Pitcairn, 1793
John Millward	Able seaman	Mutineer	Settled Tahiti	Captured, convicted, executed
Matthew Quintal	Able seaman	Mutineer	Sailed to Pitcairn	Murdered on Pitcairn, 1799
Richard Skinner	Able seaman	Mutineer	Settled Tahiti	Captured, drowned on Pandora 1791
John Adams ("Alexander Smith")	Able seaman	Mutineer	Sailed to Pitcairn	Died on Pitcairn, 1829
John Sumner	Able seaman	Mutineer	Settled Tahiti	Captured, drowned on Pandora 1791
Matthew Thompson	Able seaman	Mutineer	Settled Tahiti	Murdered in Tahiti, c. 1790
James Valentine	Able seaman	—	—	Died on Bounty before mutiny 1788
John Williams	Able seaman	Mutineer	Sailed to Pitcairn	Murdered on Pitcairn, 1793
David Nelson	Botanist (civilian)	Loyalist	Open boat voyage	Died in Coupang, 1789
William Brown	Assistant gardener (civilian)	Mutineer	Sailed to Pitcairn	Murdered on Pitcairn, 1793

=== Michael Byrne ===
Michael Byrne was born in Kilkenny, Ireland, in 1761. He went to sea as an able seaman at the age of 19. He had served on five naval ships by 1787, when he was signed as an able seaman by Captain Bligh on the Bounty, primarily to play the fiddle. Bligh wrote, "I had great difficulty before I left England to get a man to play the violin and I preferred at last to take one two-thirds blind than come without one," and described him as being "5 feet 6 inches high. Fair complexion and is almost blind. Plays the fiddle. Has the mark of an issue in the back of his neck."

During the mutiny on 28 April 1789, Byrne was notably the sole able seaman who was a loyalist, but he remained on the ship with the mutineers, apparently because his near-blindness added to his confusion. He was put ashore on Tahiti by Fletcher Christian. He gave himself up voluntarily when the Pandora arrived in 1791, and subsequently survived the wreck of the Pandora. He was acquitted of mutiny at court-martial in 1792.

He later served with Bligh's nephew, Francis Bond, on the Prompte; his subsequent fate is unknown.

=== Thomas Ellison ===
Thomas Ellison (1772 – 29 October 1792) was an able seaman. After participating in the mutiny, he remained in Tahiti rather than continuing on to the Pitcairn Islands, and in 1791 voluntarily turned himself in to the seamen of HMS Pandora to face justice in England. He was court-martialed at Spithead in September 1792, sentenced to death, and hanged on 29 October. Questions continue as to the degree of Ellison's culpability in the mutiny.

Ellison, although he was only 15 years old when he was mustered aboard captain William Bligh's armed vessel Bounty as it sailed from Spithead for Tahiti, was already an experienced able seaman who had seen service in the merchant navy under Bligh in the West Indies. He was short (5 ft 3 in, 1.60 m) and was described as dark-haired and fair-skinned. In records of the outbound voyage, Bligh praised the lad as "improving" and "is a very good Boy and will do very well." Bligh also instructed his clerk, John Samuel, to teach "Writing and Arithmetick" to the illiterate teenager.

During the Mutiny on the Bounty on 28 April 1789, Ellison was standing his watch as the ship's wheelsman, which gave him a vantage point to view the personal confrontation between Captain Bligh and Fletcher Christian at the heart of the mutiny. Ellison described himself as continuing to obey the captain's orders to "clap the helm down". However, the young seaman then handed control of the helm to a mutineer, John Mills, and left the scene to ask for advice from a loyal crewman, Lawrence LeBogue. When the time came for Ellison to tell his story at his court-martial, he tried to portray this incident as an attempt to establish his loyalty; but LeBogue – who would within minutes be set adrift with Bligh in the ship's boat – was less than helpful or sympathetic to the confused youth:

He being wex'd, I believe, answerd me in a Sharp surly manner, told me to go to hell and not bother him; this Reception from my old ship mate quite Disheartened me from making an application to any One else.

He gave himself up voluntarily when HMS Pandora arrived in 1791, and was placed in irons as a mutineer. He subsequently survived the wreck of his prison ship, and was forwarded, still as a prisoner, to England for court-martial proceedings. Ellison faced his judges in September 1792. In his court-martial testimony, the loyal midshipman Thomas Hayward, who had also witnessed the mutiny, claimed to see young Ellison holding a bayonet and saying of Bligh, "Damn him, I will be sentry over him." Hayward also said he saw Ellison in a crowd of mutineers that were jeering their powerless ex-captain and "publicly insulting" him. John Hallett Claimed that Ellison remarked that Bligh would be put ashore and that he would be allowed back on ship. Ellison in turn claimed that Hayward and Hallet were crying and lost control of themselves. In all the testimony only Haywood claimed that Ellison was a guard over Bligh and used insulting language; yet Bligh in his own narrative did not mention Ellison standing guard nor insulting him. Unfortunely for Ellison three of the Loyal suriviors [Cole; Purcell, and Smith] recalled seeing him armed with a musket and bayonet. Able seaman Ellison was seriously outranked by Hayward, who had been promoted to lieutenant, and had no means to hire counsel for his defence or to impeach this damning testimony. As a forlorn hope, the doomed man wrote out a paper for the Judge Advocate, pleading his case and describing the mutiny from his point of view. In this paper he concluded:

I hope, honorable Gentlemen, yo'll be so Kind as to take my Case into Consideration as I was No more than between Sixteen and Seventeen Years of age when this of [sic] done. Honourable Gentlemen, I leave my self at the Clemency and Mercy of this Honourable Court.

This plea appears to be Ellison's own work, as it contains phonetic misspellings characteristic of his Cockney dialect. It did not, however, save the seaman from the gallows. He was convicted of mutiny and hanged at Spithead on 29 October 1792.

The 1932 novel Mutiny on the Bounty, by Charles Nordhoff and James Norman Hall, portrays Ellison as a heroic character. His youthful optimism is depicted as raising the spirits of his fellow mutineer-prisoners, and his conviction and execution are characterised as a miscarriage of justice. In the 1984 film The Bounty, he is played by Dexter Fletcher.

=== John Fryer ===
John Fryer
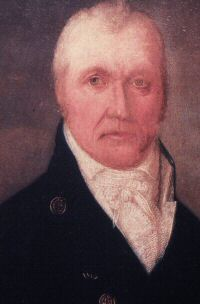
- Born: 15 August 1753; Wells, Norfolk, England
- Died: 26 May 1817 (aged 63); Wells, Norfolk, England
- Military career
- Allegiance: United Kingdom
- Branch: Royal Navy
- Service years: 1781–1812
- Rank: Sailing master
- Notable event: Mutiny on the Bounty

John Fryer (15 August 1753 – 26 May 1817) was the sailing master on Bounty. He was a strong critic of both Lieutenant William Bligh and mutiny leader Fletcher Christian, at one time even accusing Bligh of favouring Christian. Despite his anger at Bligh, he did not support the mutiny.

Fryer was born at Wells-next-the-Sea, Norfolk. After his naval service, he returned to Wells, and his grave in the churchyard is now clearly identified. In 1787, Fryer was appointed master of HMS Bounty, with Fletcher Christian serving as master's mate. On 10 January 1788, Bligh put his crew on three watches, giving one of them to Christian, and on 2 March, promoted Christian to acting lieutenant. Some have speculated that this was the source of the ill-will that later developed between Fryer and Bligh. However, as a master, Fryer would never have been promoted to lieutenant at sea. Indeed, he never did become a lieutenant.

Fryer remained loyal, and accompanied Bligh in reaching Timor. Bligh's account of the mutiny vilified Fryer, but Fryer gave fair evidence at Bligh's court-martial. Edward Christian, Fletcher's brother, was assisted by Fryer in publishing a counterweight to Bligh's version. Fryer never received promotion, but served in the Royal Navy until 1812.

In the 1935 film, Fryer was played by DeWitt Jennings, while Eddie Byrne portrayed him in the 1962 Mutiny on the Bounty. Daniel Day-Lewis portrayed him in the 1984 film The Bounty.

=== John Hallett ===
John Hallett (1772–1794) was a midshipman on the Bounty. He was only 15 when he signed on, and 17 at the time of the mutiny; he accompanied Captain William Bligh on his open boat voyage to the Dutch East Indies. After his return to England he was promoted to lieutenant. He died on 1 December 1794 in Bedford, England, aged 22.

=== Thomas Hayward ===
Thomas Hayward (1767–1797) was a sailor present during the mutiny. He was born in Hackney, where his father, Francis Hayward M.D., was a noted physician. Hayward's oldest sister, Ann, was a close friend of Betsy Betham, who married William Bligh. Through Betsy, Hayward managed to obtain a position as a midshipman on the Bounty. His service on the Bounty seems to have been lacklustre, but he remained loyal to Bligh and a staunch opponent of Fletcher Christian, who disliked him immensely. He was the second person ordered into the boat carrying the loyalists, the first being Bligh himself. Heywood also disliked Hayward, calling him a 'worldling', raised a little in society, as a result of which he typically affected airs and graces beyond his station.

Upon returning to England with Bligh, Hayward set out as third lieutenant under Captain Edward Edwards on HMS Pandora. Although they succeeded in finding some of the mutineers on Tahiti, and Hayward evidently performed well, it was an unfortunate voyage, ending with Pandora shipwrecked, and for the second time in as many years Hayward found himself without a ship, in an open boat making for safety. He eventually returned to England with other survivors from the Pandora, and joined HMS Diomede as second lieutenant. Remarkably, the Diomede also shipwrecked, off the coast of Ceylon in August 1795. In what was his last ship, Hayward received command of the sloop HMS Swift, which was lost with all hands in a typhoon in the South China Sea in 1797.

Hayward is not to be confused with Peter Heywood – a fellow Bounty midshipman – because of their similar-sounding names.

=== William McCoy ===
William McCoy (c.1763 – 20 April 1798) was a Scottish sailor who was with Fletcher Christian on the voyage from Tahiti to Pitcairn Island, settling there in January 1790. McCoy had one consort, Teio, and fathered two children, Daniel and Catherine. After three years, a conflict broke out between the Tahitian men and the mutineers, resulting in the deaths of all the Tahitian men, Fletcher Christian (Manx), and four of the Englishmen. McCoy (Scottish) was one of the survivors.

McCoy discovered how to distill alcohol from the sweet syrup of the ti tree root. He, Matthew Quintal, and some of the women would lie around all day in a drunken stupor. On 20 April 1798, while drunk, he killed himself by tying a stone to his neck and leaping off a cliff.

=== William Muspratt ===
William Muspratt (1759–1797) was an able seaman (AB) on His Majesty's Armed Ship Bounty. After participating in the mutiny, he was court-martialed at Spithead in September 1792, and sentenced to death, but his conviction was overturned on appeal. He returned to active service in the British navy, and probably perished in 1797 aboard HMS Bellerophon.

On the books of the Bounty, Muspratt is listed not only as an able seaman but also as the ship's tailor. His status as a craftsman did not grant any special privileges and, like the other AB's of the ship's crew, Muspratt was subject to the discipline of the ship's captain, William Bligh. Upon the Bounty's landfall in Tahiti in late 1788, Muspratt soon fell foul of his commanding officers and was sentenced in December to a dozen lashes with the cat o' nine tails for "neglect of duty." The seaman appears to have responded to this treatment by attempting to desert the ship, for on 5 January 1789, he absconded with two shipmates. All were recaptured and Muspratt was re-sentenced to four dozen additional lashes.

Soon after the Bounty made sail for the West Indies in early 1789, the mutiny occurred. Witnesses later testified that Muspratt was armed during the take-over with a musket, which he never used nor fired. The mutineer left the Bounty when it again called at Tahiti.

Bligh had meanwhile returned to England and written out descriptions of the mutineers; from this record we learn that Muspratt was "5 feet 6 inches high. Dark complexion, brown hair, slender made. Very strong black beard under his scarred chin. Tattooed in several places." When HMS Pandora arrived in Tahiti to try to recapture those mutineers that could be found, Muspratt was among those recaptured and returned to England to stand trial for mutiny.

One key element in the outcome of this trial was that Muspratt, although a common seaman, was able to find an attorney to defend him. Although eyewitness testimony depicted the seaman as having been armed during the mutiny, and he was convicted and sentenced to death, he was able successfully to appeal his conviction and return to the ranks. His subsequent service was short, however. His will, probated in January 1798, indicated that his service ended aboard HMS Bellerophon, a ship of the line.

=== Matthew Quintal ===
Matthew Quintal (baptised 3 March 1766 as Mathew Quintril, Padstow, Cornwall – 1799, Pitcairn Island) was a Cornish able seaman. His surname was, in all probability, the result of misspelling the Cornish surname "Quintrell". He was the last of the mutineers to be murdered on Pitcairn Island. He was murdered or executed by Ned Young and John Adams, leaving them the last two mutineers alive on the island.

Quintal was the first crew member punished by flogging "for Insolence and Contempt". He readily joined the mutiny. Five days after landing on Pitcairn Island, Quintal burned the Bounty, before the settlers had had a chance to remove everything of value from the ship as a safety precaution to avoid the ship giving their location away to the British Navy. It is not known if he took the action on his own or if he was ordered to. He led the others in oppressing the Polynesians. On 20 September 1793, the four remaining Polynesian men stole muskets and killed Christian, Mills, Brown, Martin, and Williams. Quintal barely escaped being one of the victims by hiding in the mountains with William McCoy.

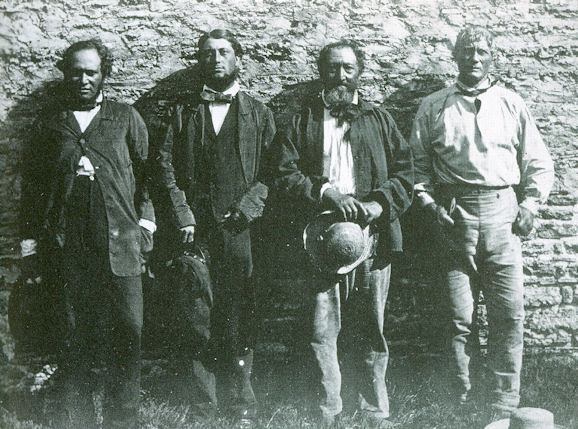
Descendants of the mutineers John Adams and Matthew Quintal on Norfolk Island, 1862. From left to right:John Adams 1827–1897 son of George Adams; John Quintal 1820–1912 son of Arthur Quintal; George Adams 1804–1873 son of John Adams; Arthur Quintal 1795–1873 son of Matthew Quintal

McCoy discovered a means of distilling alcohol from one of the island's fruits. He and Quintal quickly descended into alcoholism, often abusing and bullying both the Polynesian men and women, including his consort Tevarua. Rosalind Young, a descendant of Ned Young, relayed a story handed down to her that Tevarua went fishing one day and failed to catch enough fish to satisfy him. He punished her by biting off her ear. He may have been drunk at the time, because he and William McCoy were drunk most of the time, consuming the ti-root brandy that McCoy had succeeded in distilling. Tevarua fell – or, some believe, killed herself by leaping – off a cliff in 1799. After McCoy killed himself, Quintal became increasingly erratic. He demanded to take Isabella, Fletcher Christian's widow, as his wife, and threatened to kill Christian's children if his demands were not granted. Ned Young and John Adams invited him to Young's home and overpowered him, then killed him with an axe.

Quintal's descendants reside on Norfolk Island to this day. A descendant, Malcolm Champion, was a swimmer in the 1912 Summer Olympics, becoming New Zealand's first ever gold medalist.

=== Ned Young ===
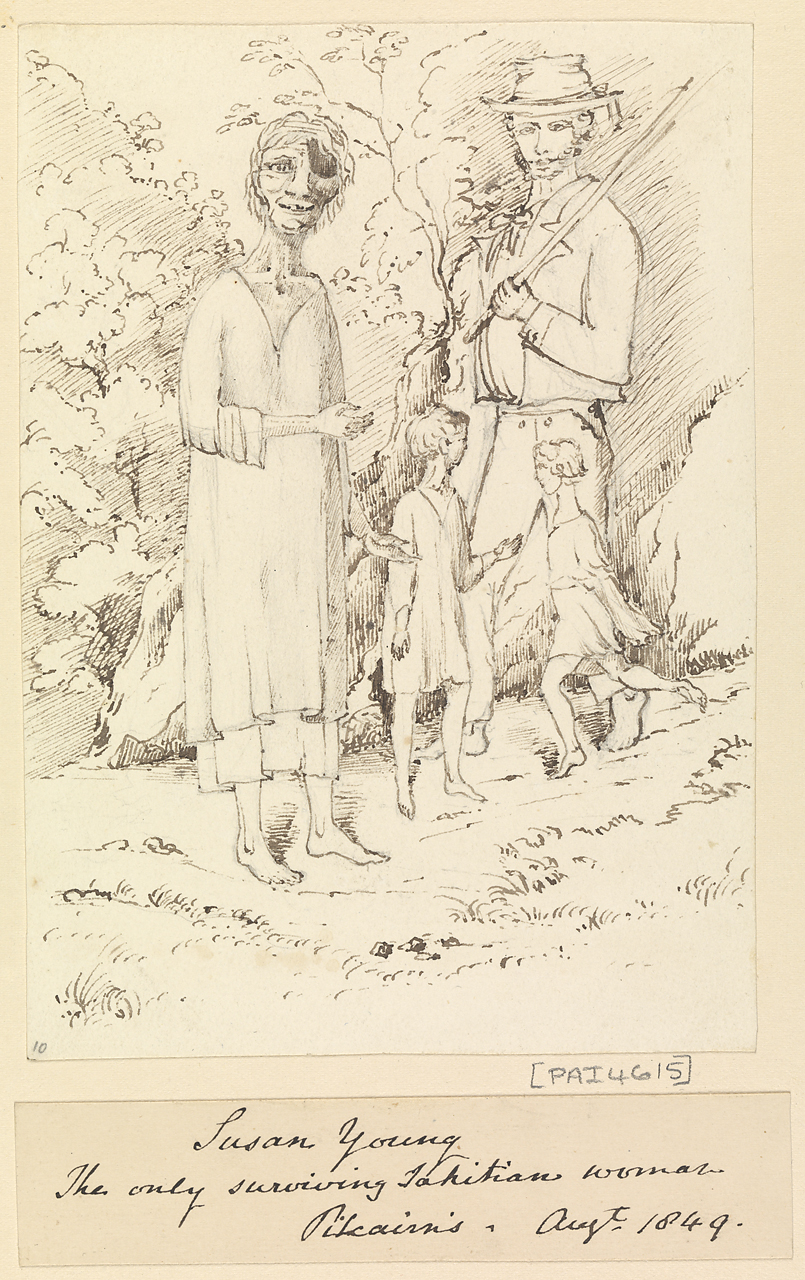
August 1849 Edward Gennys Fanshawe sketch of Susan Young, the only surviving Tahitian woman on Pitcairn's Island

Edward "Ned" Young (c. 1762 – 25 December 1800), was a British sailor, mutineer and co-founder of the mutineers' Pitcairn Island settlement. Young was born on the West Indian island of Saint Kitts. He apparently came from a poor family, but he did attend school. An 1825 Royal Navy biography reports that he was the nephew of Sir George Young, Baronet. He joined the crew of the Bounty as a midshipman. Young was asleep during the mutiny, and did not wake until after it was over. Thus, he neither participated in the mutiny nor was able to fight against it or join Bligh and others who left the ship in a long boat. Young was the only crew member to sleep through this ordeal. However, he soon fully supported Christian and the mutineers, and that he would never attempt to return to England. He joined Christian on the voyage to Pitcairn.

On Pitcairn, Young took charge of the distillery and brewed a primitive alcohol. In October 1793, when conflict broke out between the mutineers and the four surviving Tahitian men, Young slept through most of this battle as well, and was protected by a Tahitian woman who largely supported the mutineers. Young did help to hunt down and kill Neho, one of the Tahitian men. The other three surviving mutineers were Matthew Quintal, William McCoy and John Adams. Young was accepted as the leader of the island, and Adams became his friend and deputy, though some sources seem to indicate that the two men had an equal amount of power. They gained much more respect than McCoy and Quintal, who became alcoholics. Quintal became increasingly alcoholic and threatened to kill the entire community; Adams and Young killed Quintal to prevent this from happening, making themselves the only two surviving mutineers. It was after this episode that the distillery was shut down by Young. Meanwhile, they had established fruit plantations and had many children by their Tahitian wives.

In 1799 Young began to experience asthma. At about the same time, he became more religious. The other islanders converted to Christianity, and Young taught Adams and several of the children to read and write. Young's health became progressively worse and eventually he died of asthma, but Adams continued his work of educating the women and children, taking control over leadership of the island, and lived to see the island rediscovered by American and British ships.

Many of Young's and the mutineers' descendants continue to live on Pitcairn Island or Norfolk Island.

== Bibliography ==
- Alexander, Caroline (2003). The Bounty. London: Harper Collins. ISBN 978-0-00-257221-7.
- Bligh, William (1792). A Voyage to the South Sea, etc. London: Lords Commissioners of the Admiralty.
- Hough, Richard (1972). Captain Bligh and Mr Christian: The Men and the Mutiny. London: Hutchinsons. ISBN 978-0-09-112860-9.
- McKinney, Sam (1999) [1989]. Bligh!: The Whole Story of the Mutiny Aboard H.M.S. Bounty. Victoria, British Columbia: TouchWood Editions. ISBN 978-0-920663-64-6.
