= Pitcairn Island =

Only inhabited island in the Pitcairn Islands, British Overseas Territories

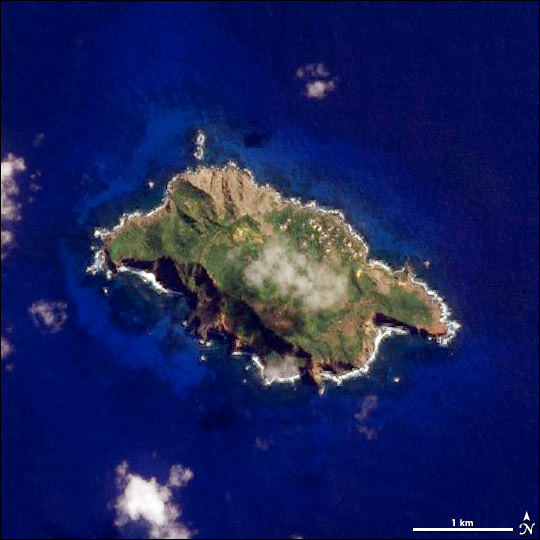
- Satellite image

- Location within Pacific Ocean
- Interactive map of Pitcairn Island

Geography
- Location: Pacific Ocean
- Coordinates: 25°04′00″S 130°06′24″W
- Archipelago: Pitcairn Islands
- Area: 4.5 km^{2} (1.7 sq mi)
- Length: 3.5 km (2.17 mi)
- Width: 1.8 km (1.12 mi)
- Highest elevation: 346 m (1135 ft)
- Highest point: Pawala Valley Ridge

Administration
- United Kingdom

Demographics
- Population: 40 (2024)
- Pop. density: 10/km^{2} (30/sq mi)

Pitcairn Island is the only inhabited island of the Pitcairn Islands, in the southern Pacific Ocean, of which many of the 40 inhabitants are descendants of mutineers of HMS Bounty.

== Geography ==
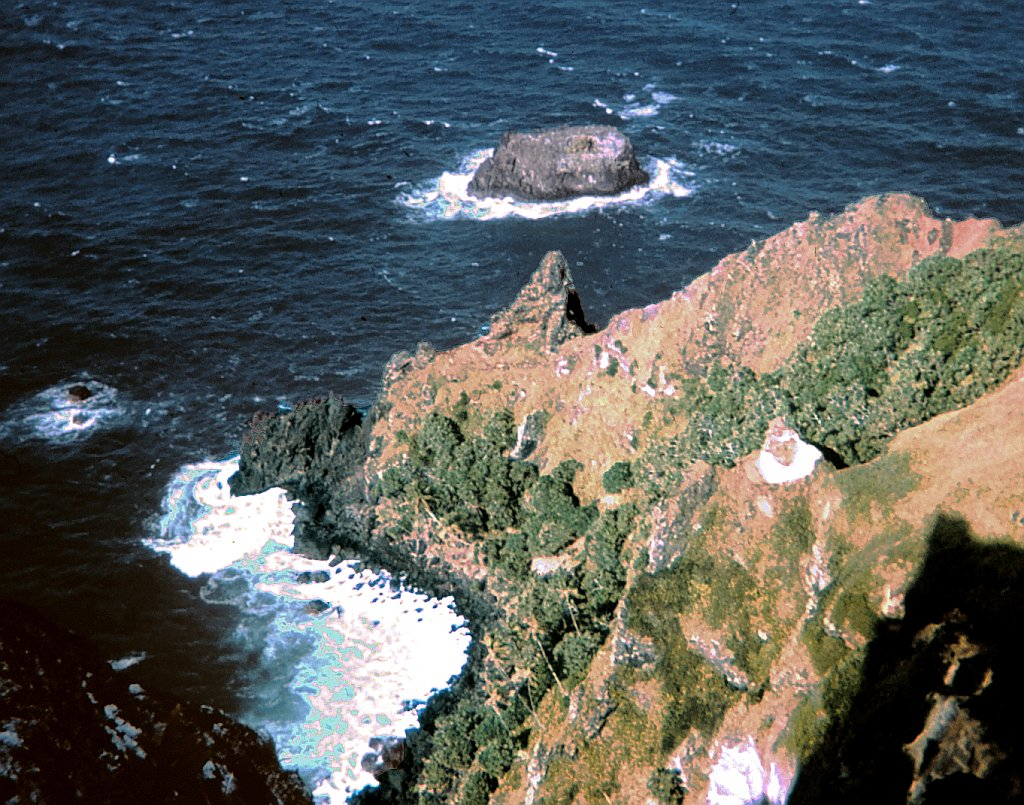
Pitcairn Island’s rocky shoreline

The island is of volcanic origin, with a rugged cliff coastline. Unlike many other South Pacific islands, it is not surrounded by coral reefs that protect the coast. The only access to the island is via a small pier on Bounty Bay. Adamstown is the sole settlement.

Pawala Valley Ridge is the island's highest point at 346 m (1,135 ft) above sea level.

The volcanic soil and tropical climate with abundant rainfall make the soil productive.

The average temperature ranges from 19 to 24 °C (66 to 75 °F). The annual rainfall is 1,800 mm (71 in).

== Fauna ==
Indigenous fauna consists of insects and lizards. Since their introduction, rats have become an invasive species.

A large number of seabirds nest along the steep shorelines.

As coral reefs are absent, fishing is offshore. Sharks, sea bream, barracuda, and tuna are all abundant. Whale migrations are seen yearly.

== See also ==
- History of the Pitcairn Islands
- Mutiny on the Bounty
- In the Wake of the Bounty (1933 film)
- Pitcairn Radio Station
