= Maison James Norman Hall =

Historic house in Arue, French Polynesia

Coordinates: 17°31′31″S 149°31′14″W

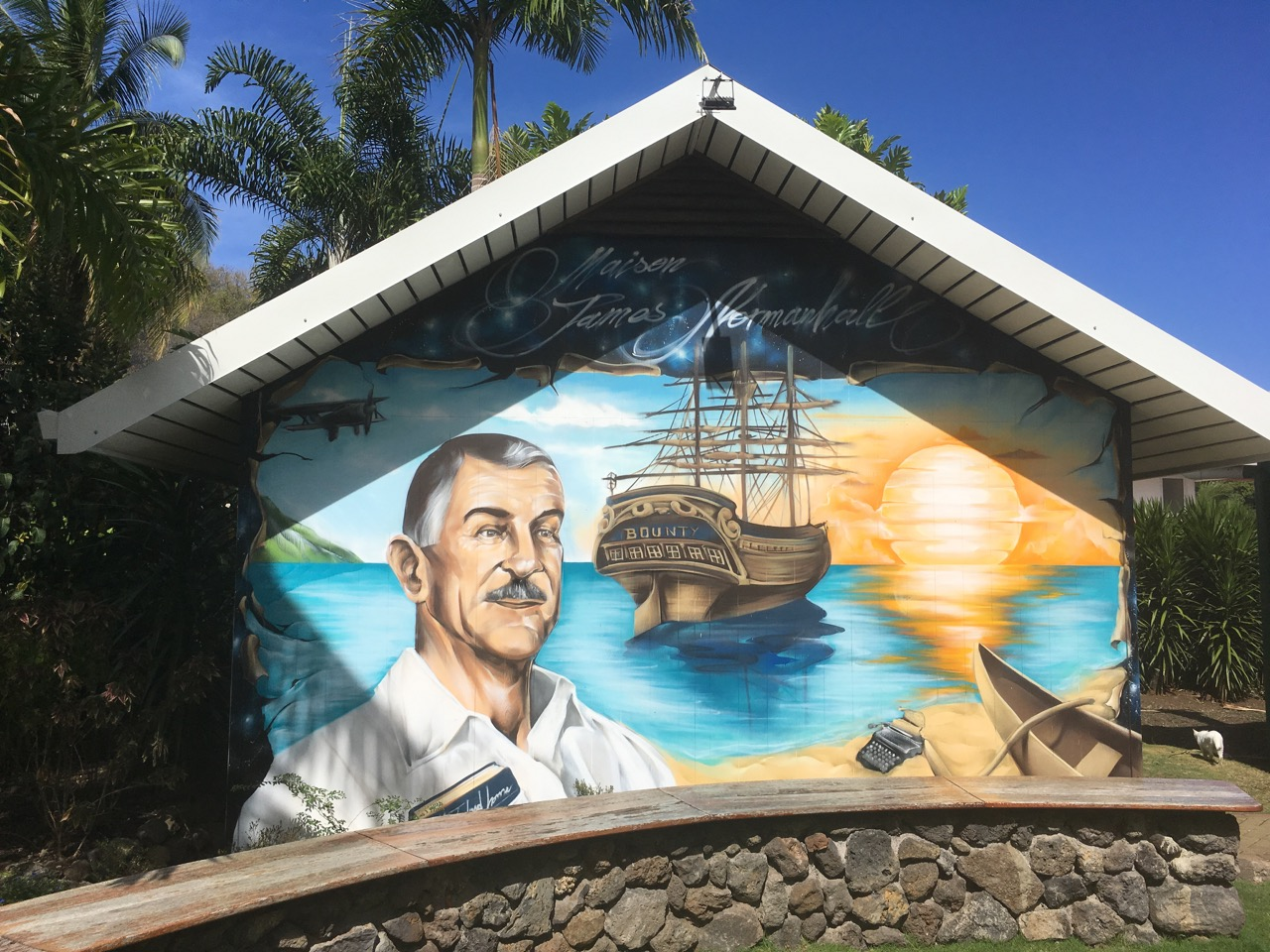
- Museum mural showing James Norman Hall and HMS Bounty
- Established: January 17, 2002
- Location: Arue, French Polynesia
- Type: Historic house museum
- Website: jamesnormanhall.com

Maison James Norman Hall is a historic house museum in Arue, French Polynesia. It exhibits the home of writer James Norman Hall, as it was in 1951 at the time of his death. Its collection includes a 3,000-volume library and the author's typewriter.

== History ==
The museum was the home of the writer James Norman Hall, his Tahitian wife Sarah Teraureia Winchester, and their children. Hall settled in Tahiti in 1924 and built the house himself in 1926, where between 1932 and 1934, he co-wrote the three volumes of The Bounty Trilogy.

Whilst Hall died in 1951, his wife continued to live there until her death in 1985. After 1985, the house then began to fall into disrepair and in 1991 it was purchased by the government of French Polynesia.

== Administration ==
On 20 July 1993, the house was declared a historical monument. However, due to a lack of funds, the building continued to degrade. By the mid-1990s, the house was a ruin, however, Hall's daughter Nancy then worked with the French Polynesian government to restore the home to its 1951 condition. It opened as a museum on 17 January 2002. As of 2008, the museum was managed by the Association of the Friends of the James Norman Hall Home, who report both to the government of French Polynesia and to Hall's descendants.

== Collection ==
The museum's collection includes Hall's 3,000-volume library, his typewriter and other objects. The displays also include personal effects on loan from the Hall family. "The house itself is neither large nor prepossessing; it was built for comfort and practicality," wrote author and screenwriter Peter Benchley. "It's what's inside the house that I found most fascinating: paintings, photographs, artefacts and anecdotes from Hall's preliterary life."

== Setting ==
Conversely, visiting the house in 2000 for a feature on the legacy of Hall and his writing partner Charles Nordhoff, author and film critic William Arnold was more impressed with the location than with what was inside the house, especially as it stood in contrast to the rest of the increasingly urbanized island.

Sitting on the elegant outdoor verandah, cooled by a fresh ocean breeze, shaded by towering palm trees and half-intoxicated by the perfume of frangipani and a hundred other varieities of flowering shrubs planted by Hall in the '30s, one is overwhelmed with a sense of environmental perfection, of absolute paradise. This hilltop Eden carved out of the jungle is simply one of the most lovely spots on Earth.

== Public engagement ==
In 2018, the Minister of Tourism, Nicole Bouteau, alongside Nancy Rutgers-Hall, opened a new terraced area at the museum, which expanded its capacity for catering and conference provision. As of 2021, the museum provided personalised guided tours, where visitors could choose the aspects of the site they wanted to discover.

== Legacy ==
Alongside the Robert Louis Stevenson Museum in Samoa, the museum is considered an important site for European colonial heritage in the Pacific.

== Gallery ==
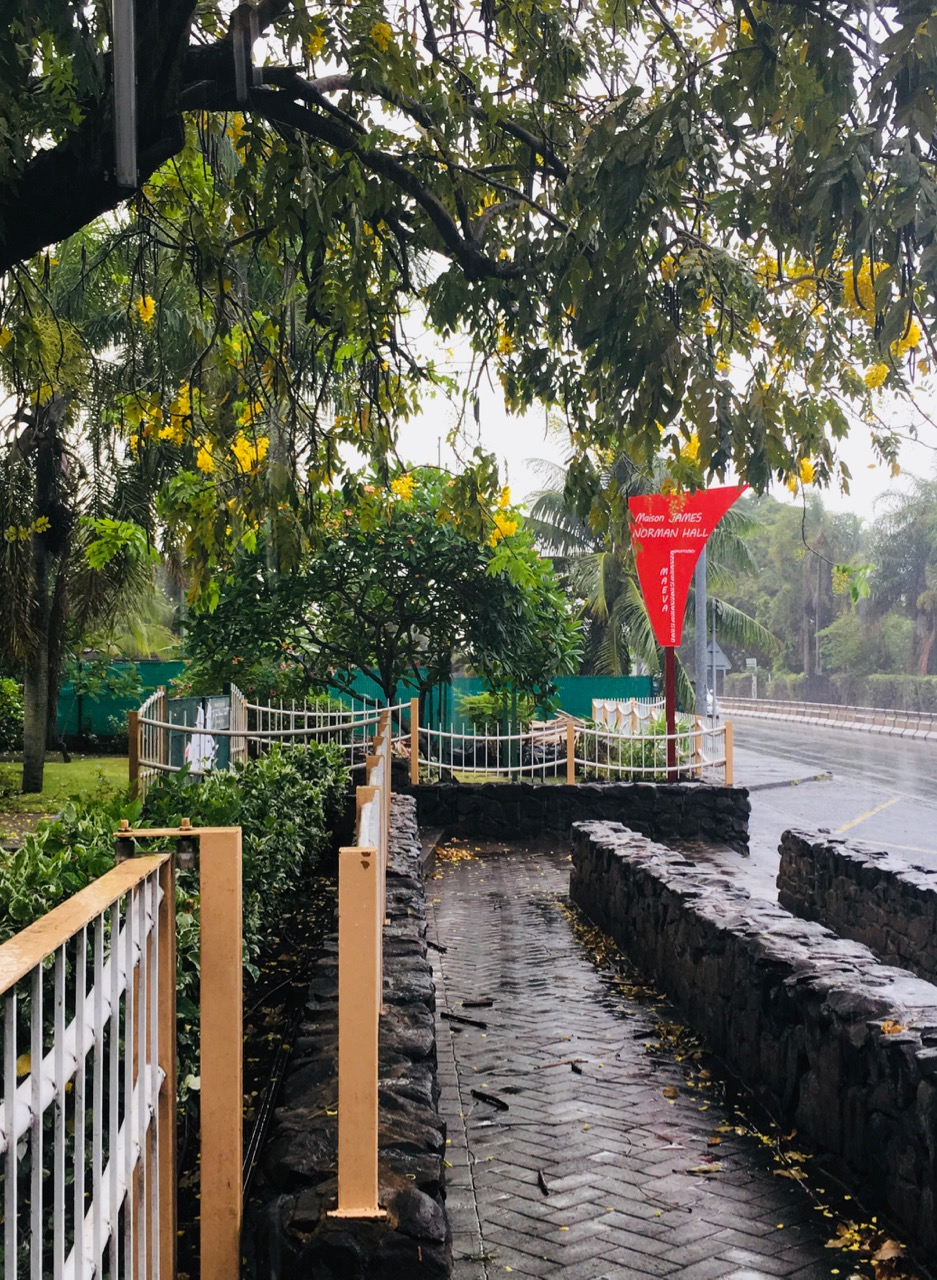
Museum entrance

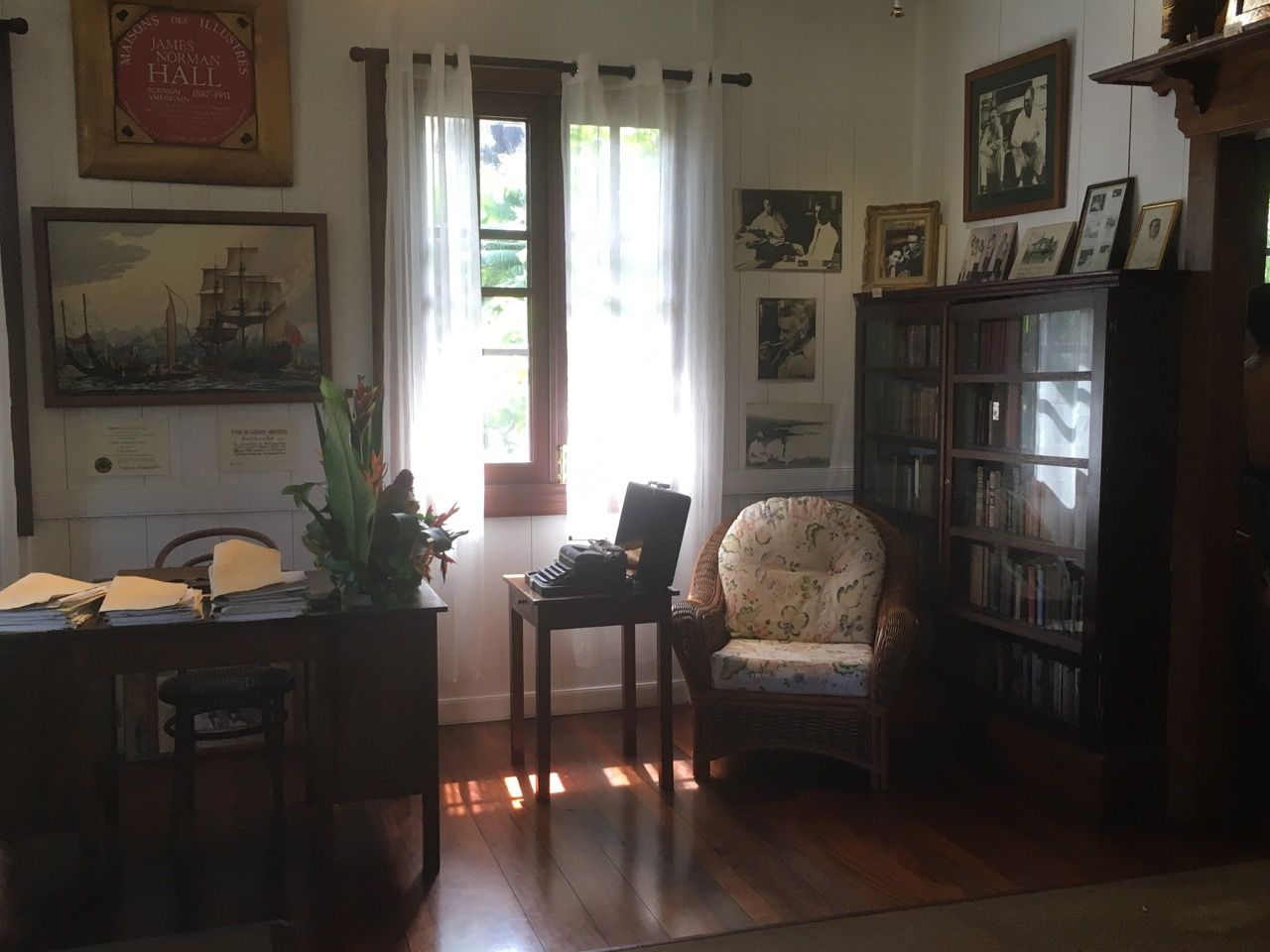
James Norman Hall's office

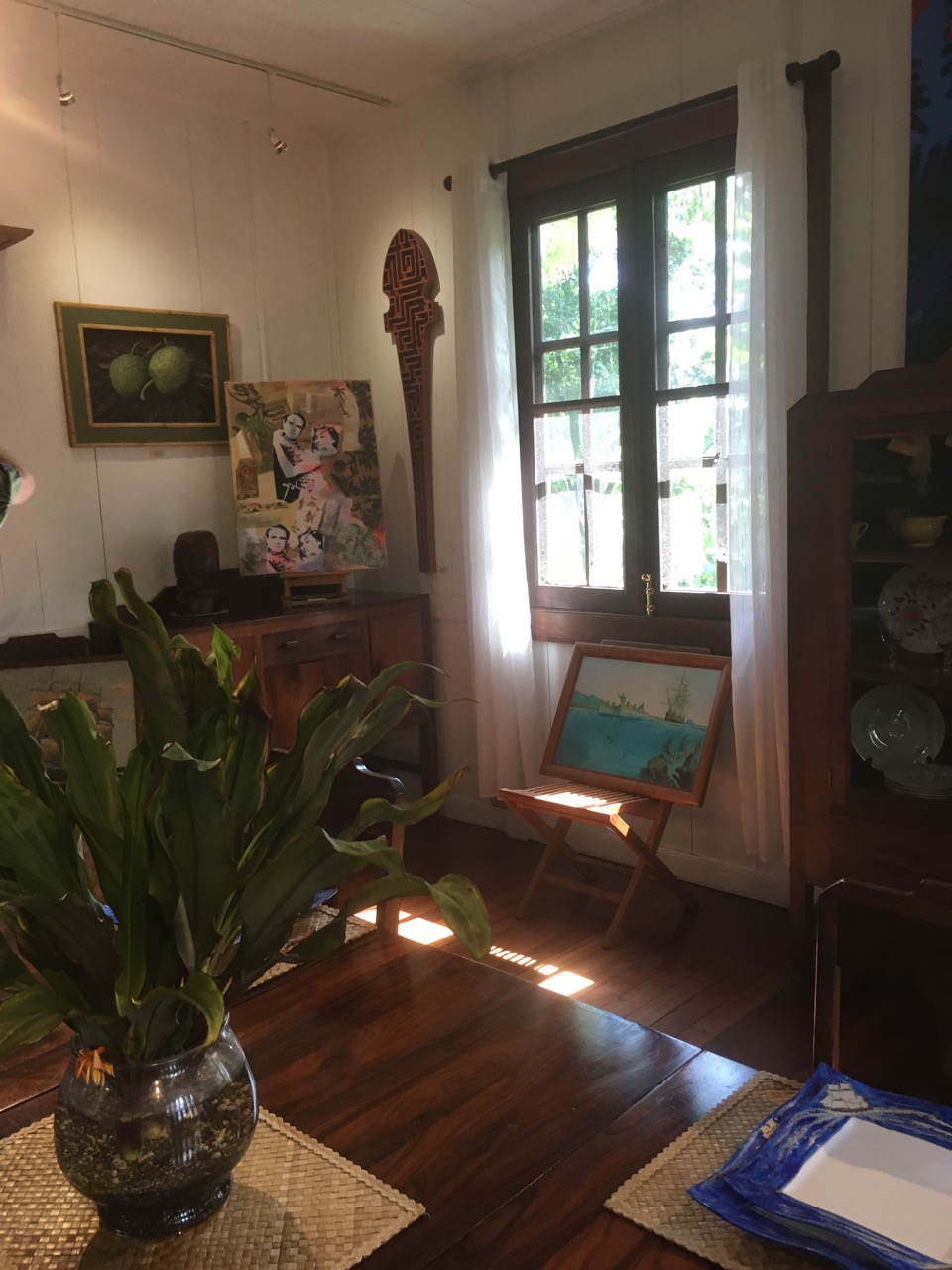
Music room

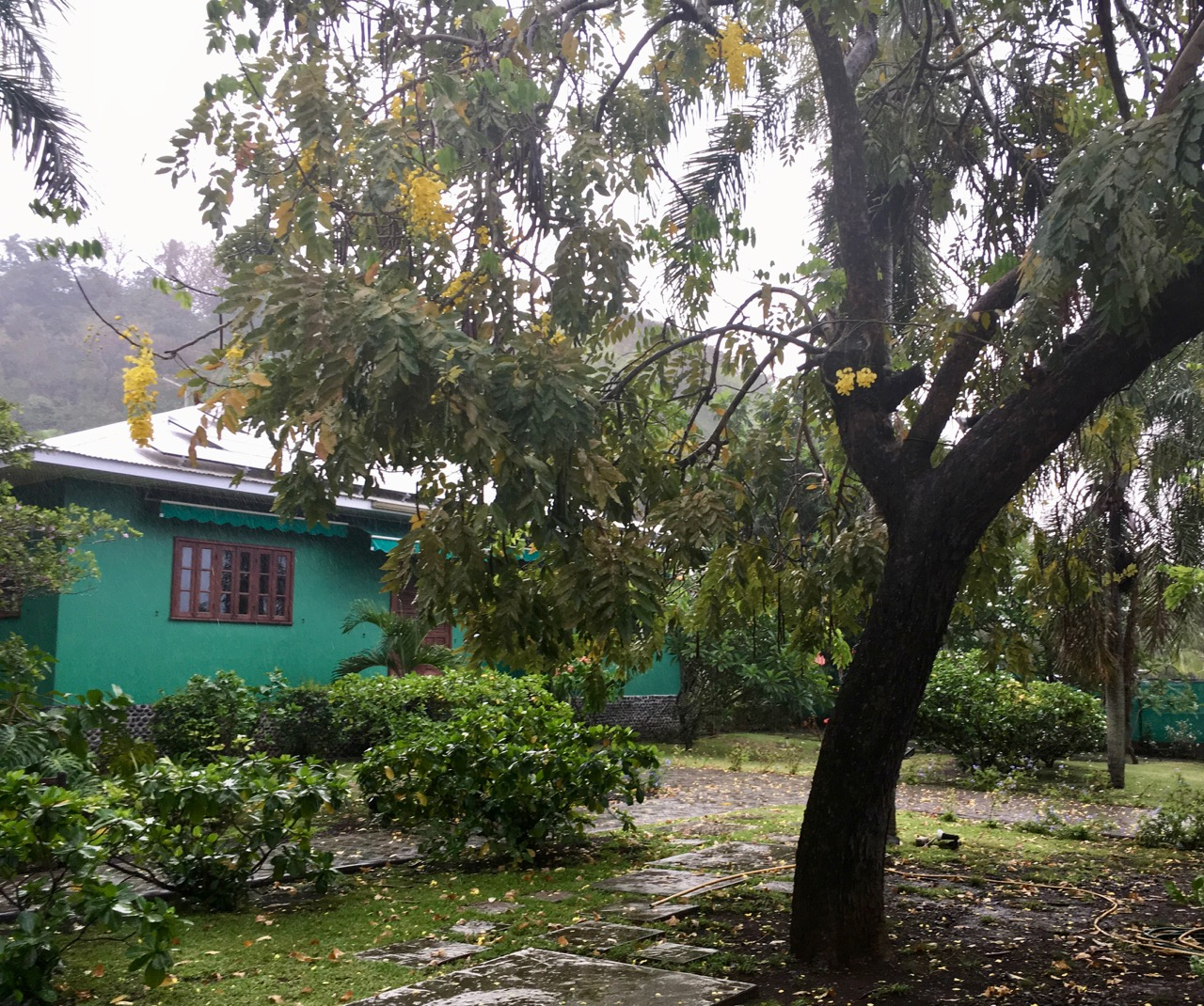
House viewed from the garden

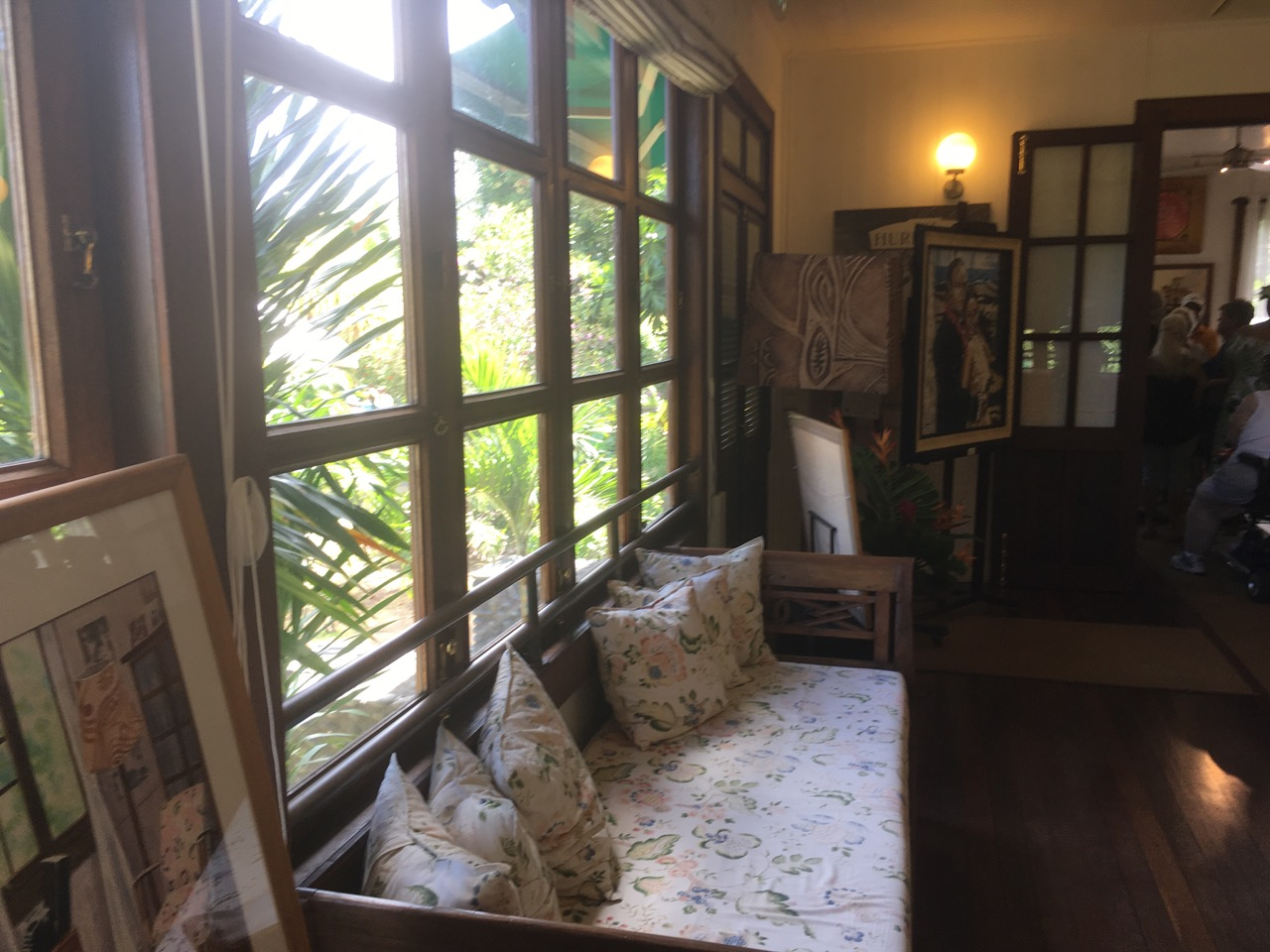
Veranda
