= James Norman Hall House =

Historic house in Iowa, United States

- U.S. National Register of Historic Places
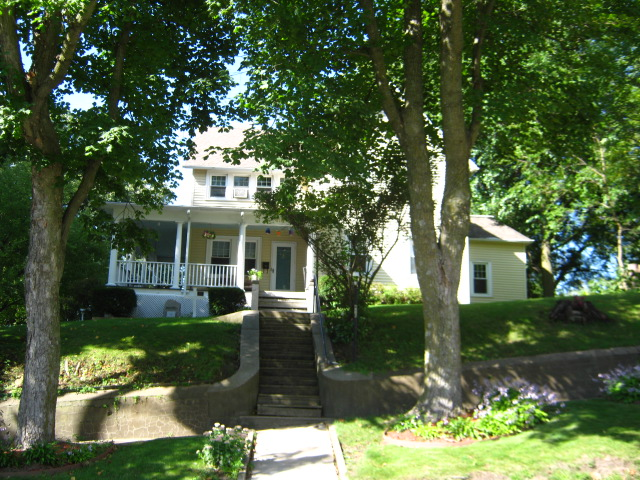

- Location within Iowa Location within the United States
- Location: 416 E. Howard St. Colfax, Iowa
- Coordinates: 41°40′43″N 93°14′21″W
- Area: less than one acre
- Built: 1887
- NRHP reference No.: 84003853
- Added to NRHP: July 12, 1984

The James Norman Hall House is a historic residence located in Colfax, Iowa, United States. This was an early home of author James Norman Hall. His first book was written here, and it figured into his other works, notably Oh Millersburg! He is best known as a co-author of the 1932 novel Mutiny on The Bounty. Most of Hall's life, however, was lived outside of Colfax and the United States in his later years. The two-story frame house follows an L-plan. There is a single-story wraparound porch on the west, south and half of the southeast sides. It was listed on the National Register of Historic Places in 1984.
