= List of museums in French Polynesia =

Museums in French Polynesia include:

- Musée de Tahiti et des Îles
- James Norman Hall Home
- Robert Wan Pearl Museum
- Paul Gauguin Museum
