= James Norman Hall =

American writer (1887–1951)

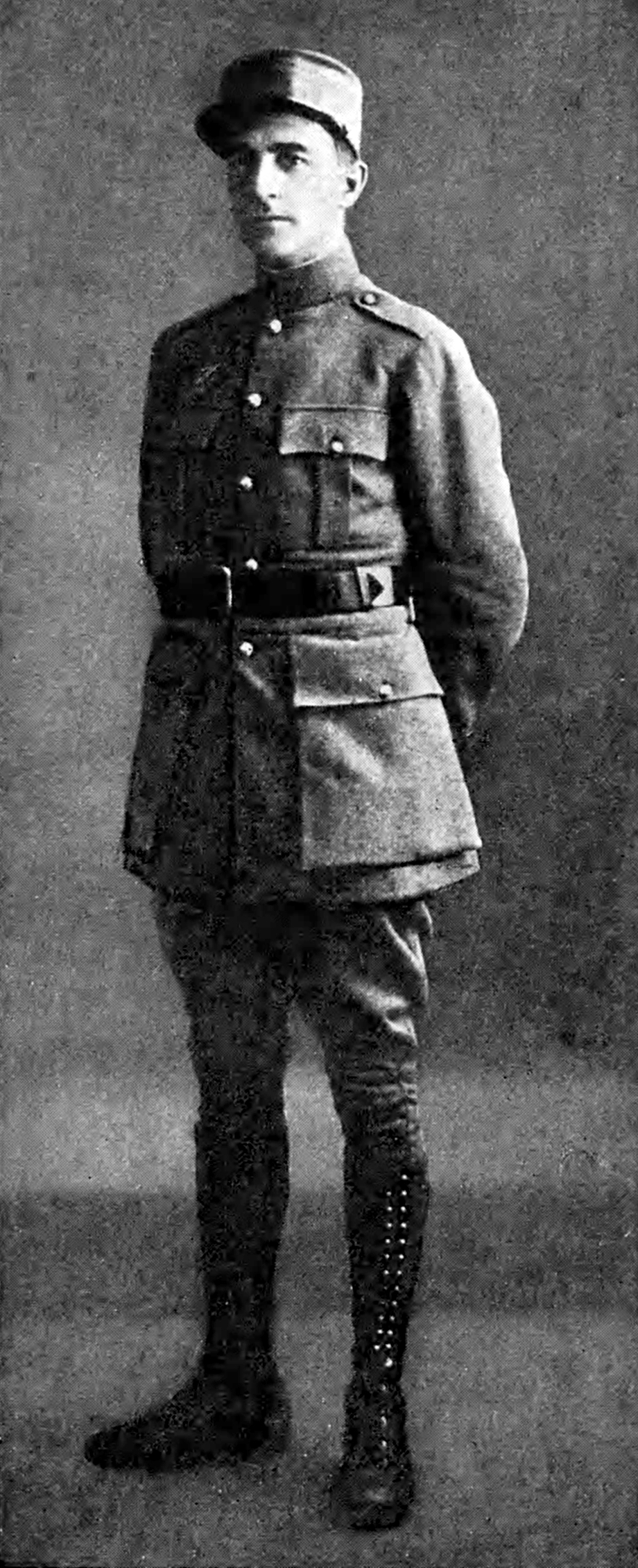
- James Norman Hall
- Born: 22 April 1887; Colfax, Iowa
- Died: 5 July 1951 (aged 64); Arue, Tahiti, French Polynesia
- Resting place: Grounds of the James Norman Hall House, Arue, Tahiti, French Polynesia
- Education: Grinnell College (BA)
- Occupations: Novelist, memoirist, nonfiction writer, World War I soldier and aviator
- Spouse: Sarah “Lala” Winchester
- Children: 2, including Conrad L. Hall
- Writing career
- Period: 1916–1951
- Genres: Adventure fiction, historical fiction, memoir, military nonfiction, travel writing, South Seas
- Subjects: World War I, military aviation, maritime history, colonialism, French Polynesia, cultural encounter
- Notable works: The Bounty Trilogy (Mutiny on the Bounty, Men Against the Sea, Pitcairn’s Island), The Lafayette Flying Corps, The Hurricane, My Island Home
- Notable awards: Distinguished Service Cross, Croix de Guerre, Médaille militaire, Légion d'honneur
- Website: www.jamesnormanhall.com

James Norman Hall (22 April 1887 – 5 July 1951) was an American writer best known for The Bounty Trilogy, a series of historical novels co-authored with Charles Bernard Nordhoff: Mutiny on the Bounty (1932), Men Against the Sea (1934), and Pitcairn's Island (1934). During World War I, Hall uniquely served in the armed forces of three Allied nations—Great Britain as an infantryman, and later France and the United States as an aviator. His wartime honors include the Croix de Guerre, the Médaille Militaire, the Légion d'Honneur, and the Distinguished Service Cross. After the war, he settled in Tahiti, where he and Nordhoff wrote a number of successful adventure novels, many of which were adapted into films. He was also the father of Conrad L. Hall, a three-time Academy Award-winning cinematographer.

== Biography ==
James Norman Hall, circa mid-1917 to early 1918, during his service with the Aéronautique Militaire as part of the Lafayette Escadrille.

Hall was born in Colfax, Iowa, where he attended local schools. His early home is listed on the National Register of Historic Places. He graduated from Grinnell College in 1910. Hall also wrote the song Sons of Old Grinnell, which remains part of the college songbook. After graduation, he worked as a social worker in Boston for the Society for the Prevention of Cruelty to Children while pursuing a writing career and studying for a master's degree at Harvard University.

Hall was vacationing in the United Kingdom in the summer of 1914, when World War I broke out. Posing as a Canadian, he enlisted in the British Army and served in the Royal Fusiliers as a machine gunner during the Battle of Loos. After his true nationality was discovered, he was discharged and returned to the United States. His first book, Kitchener's Mob (1916), recounts these wartime experiences. It sold moderately well in America, and following a speaking tour to promote it, Hall returned to Europe in 1916 on assignment with The Atlantic Monthly. He was tasked with writing a series of stories about American volunteers in the Lafayette Escadrille, but after spending time with the group, Hall became inspired to enlist in the Aéronautique Militaire, the French air service at the time. By then, a growing number of American pilots—including Hall—were serving in various French squadrons as part of the Lafayette Flying Corps, a larger effort that went beyond the Escadrille. He trained at the Avord and Pau aviation schools and was assigned to Escadrille N.124—the famed Lafayette Escadrille—in June 1917. After being wounded in combat, he recovered and rejoined the unit later that year.

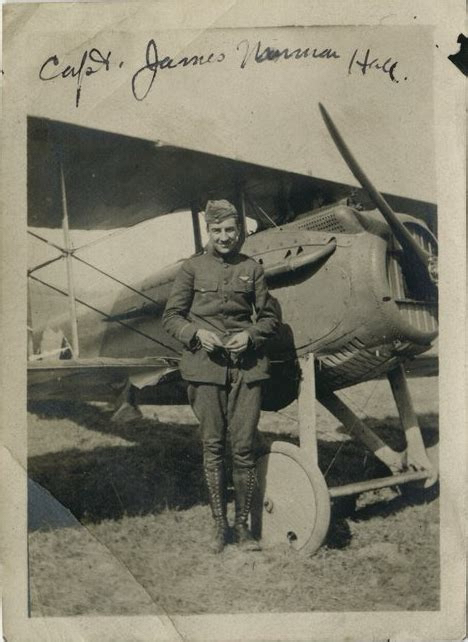
Hall standing beside a French SPAD fighter during his service in the Aéronautique Militaire, circa mid-1917 to early 1918

During his time in French aviation, Hall was awarded the Croix de Guerre with five palms and the Médaille Militaire. In early 1918, after the United States entered the war, the Lafayette Escadrille was incorporated into the American 103rd Aero Squadron, and Hall was commissioned as a captain in the Army Air Service. Hall flew several combat missions over the Western Front with the 103rd Aero Squadron and later the 94th Aero Squadron, one of the first American pursuit units. During a brief period in early 1918, he served as acting commander of the 94th, where he flew alongside future ace Eddie Rickenbacker.

On May 7, 1918, during a dogfight over German lines, Hall's Nieuport lost fabric on its upper wing and was hit by antiaircraft fire, forcing him to crash-land in enemy territory. After being shot down, Hall spent the remainder of the war as a prisoner of war in Germany. Hall was held at Landshut prison camp in Bavaria. During captivity, he kept a secret diary and continued writing, an experience that later influenced both his memoir High Adventure and his fiction. Following his release, he received both the French Légion d'Honneur and the American Distinguished Service Cross.

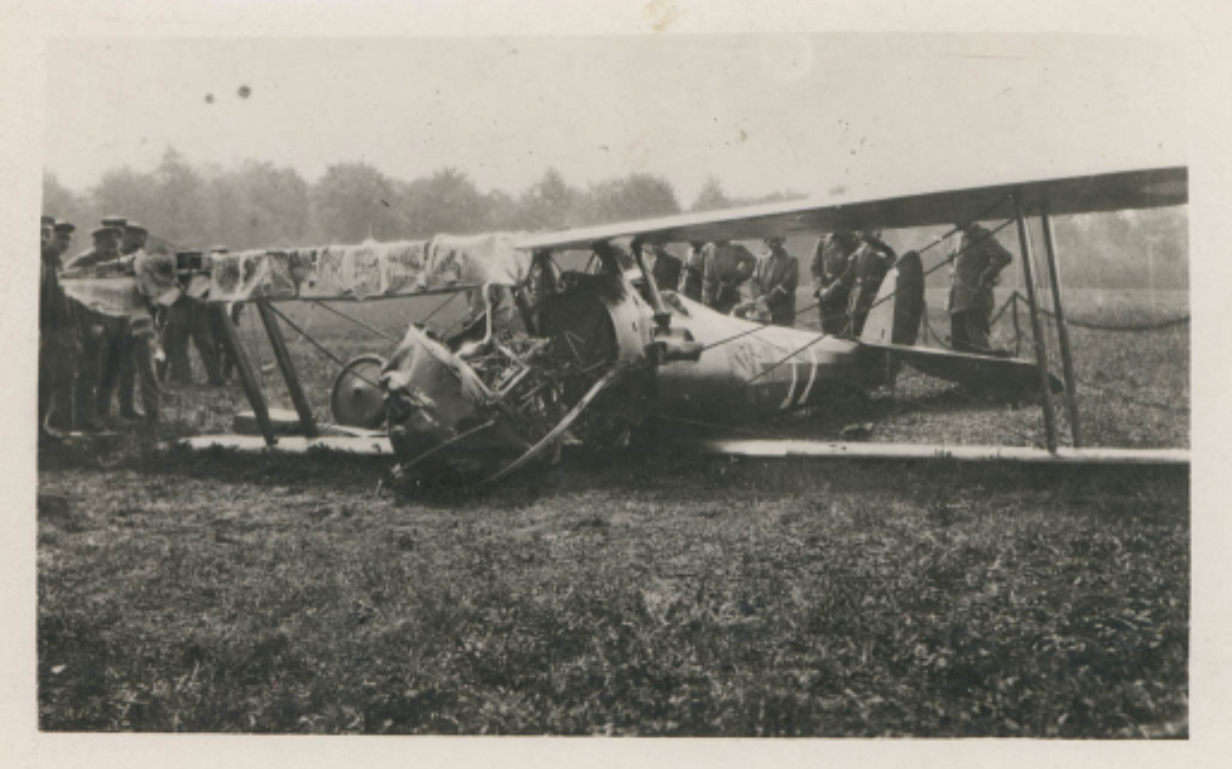
The wreckage of Hall’s aircraft after being shot down over German lines on May 7, 1918. The handwritten caption on the reverse reads: "J. N. Hall's machine fallen inside the German lines." Photograph by an unidentified German photographer, circa May 1918. From the Ellery Sedgwick photograph collection.

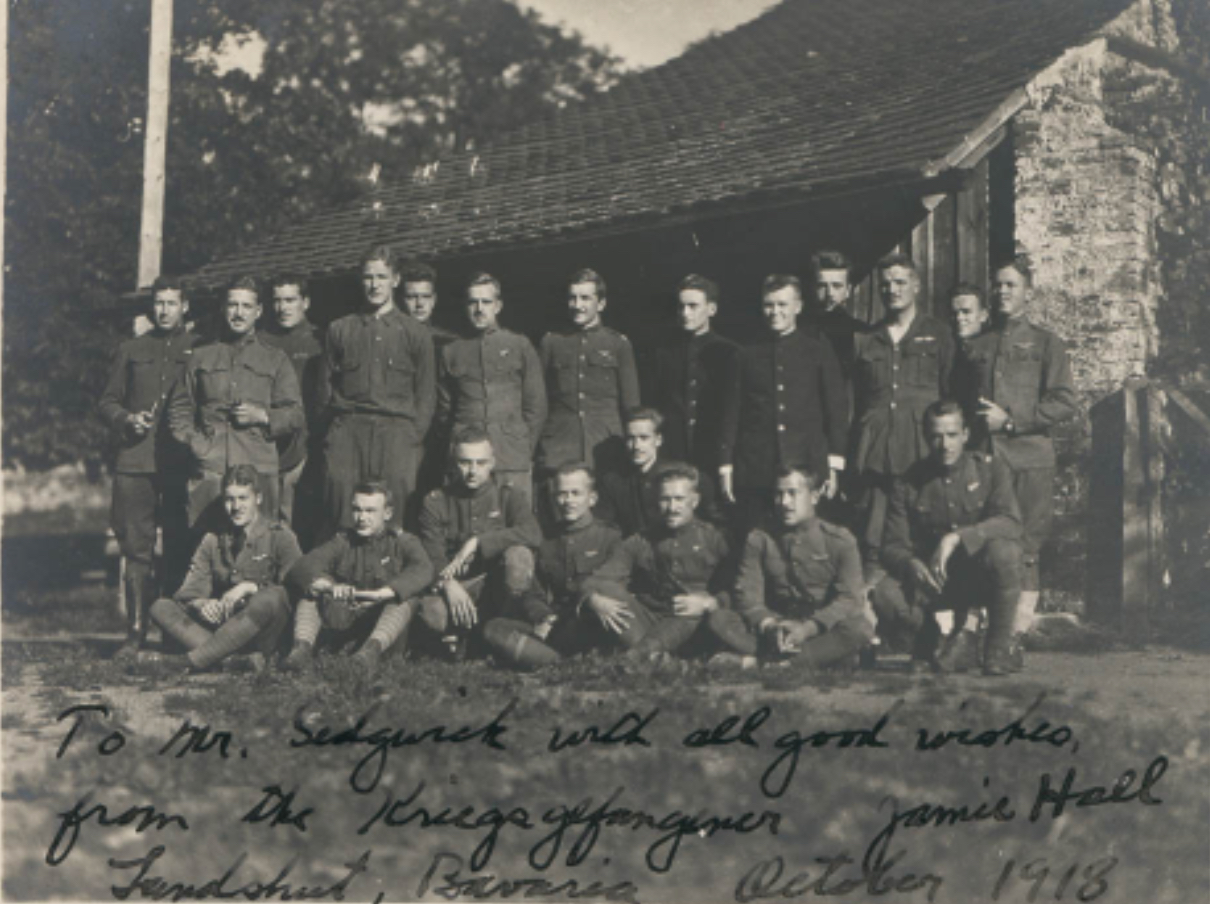
Hall with fellow Allied prisoners at a German prison camp in Landshut, Bavaria, October 1918. Hall sent this photograph to his editor at The Atlantic Monthly, Ellery Sedgwick, with the handwritten note: "To Mr. Sedgwick with all good wishes from the Kriegsgefangener, Landshut, Bavaria. Jamie Hall, October 1918.”

His experiences with both French and American units informed his later writing. In the postwar period, Hall was tasked with compiling a history of American pilots who had flown for France as a part of the Lafayette Flying Corps. During this work, he met fellow aviator and writer Charles Bernard Nordhoff, who had also published in The Atlantic Monthly during the war. He met Ellery Sedgwick in 1916, after his first return from France, and began a literary partnership that would last over 25 years. Their first major collaboration, published in 1920, was The Lafayette Flying Corps—a two-volume chronicle of American aviators in French service that remains a key source on the subject.

Not long after publishing The Lafayette Flying Corps, Hall settled in Tahiti, where he reunited with Nordhoff, and the two embarked on a successful writing career together. Together, they co-authored a number of successful adventure novels, most notably their trilogy of novels based on the Bounty mutiny, beginning with Mutiny on the Bounty. In addition to the various Bounty films, several of their works were adapted into films, including The Hurricane (1937), which starred Hall’s nephew, Jon Hall; Passage to Marseille (1944), featuring Humphrey Bogart; and Botany Bay (1953), starring Alan Ladd.

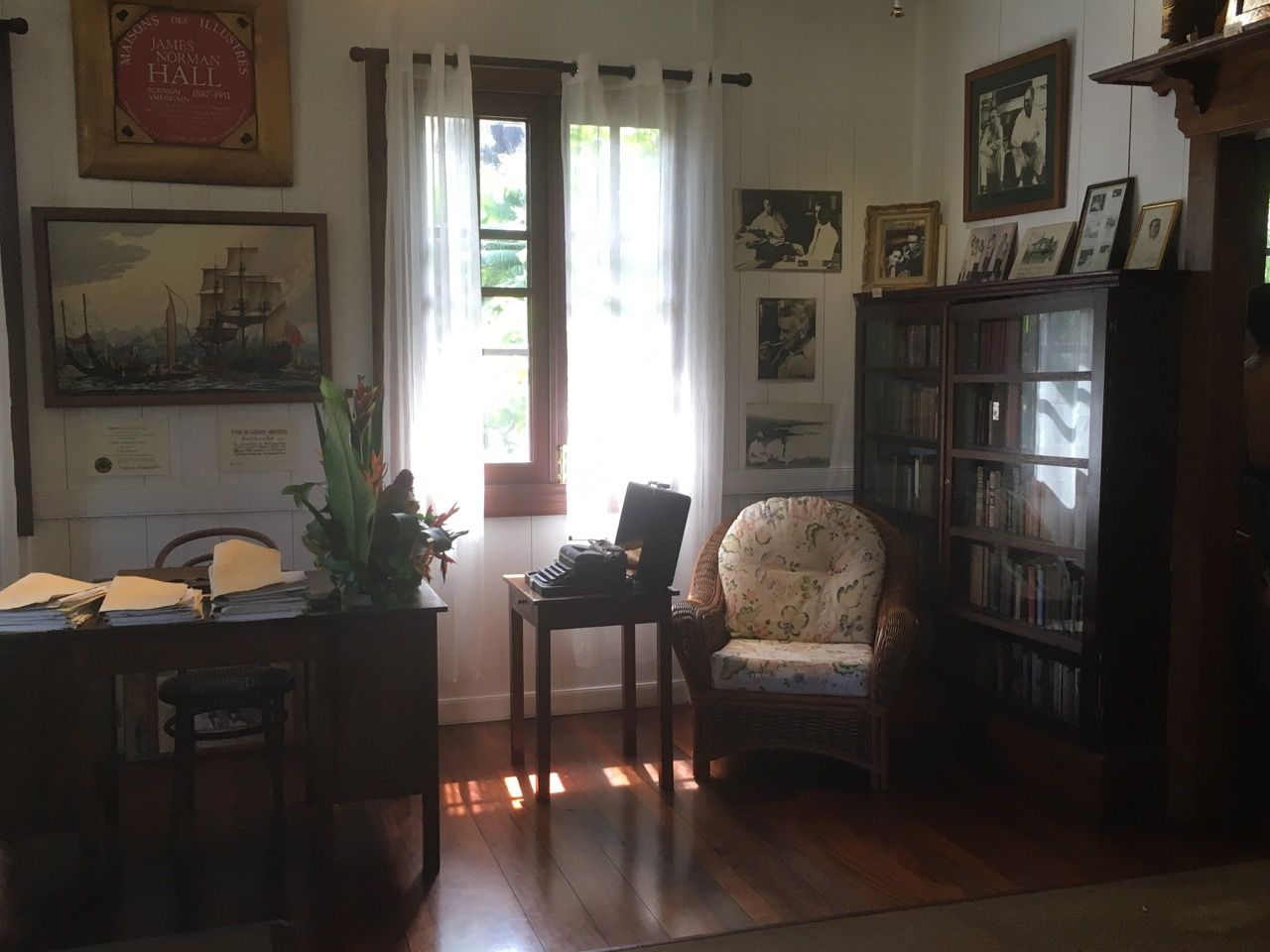
Hall's office in La Maison James Norman Hall, where he wrote many of his postwar works

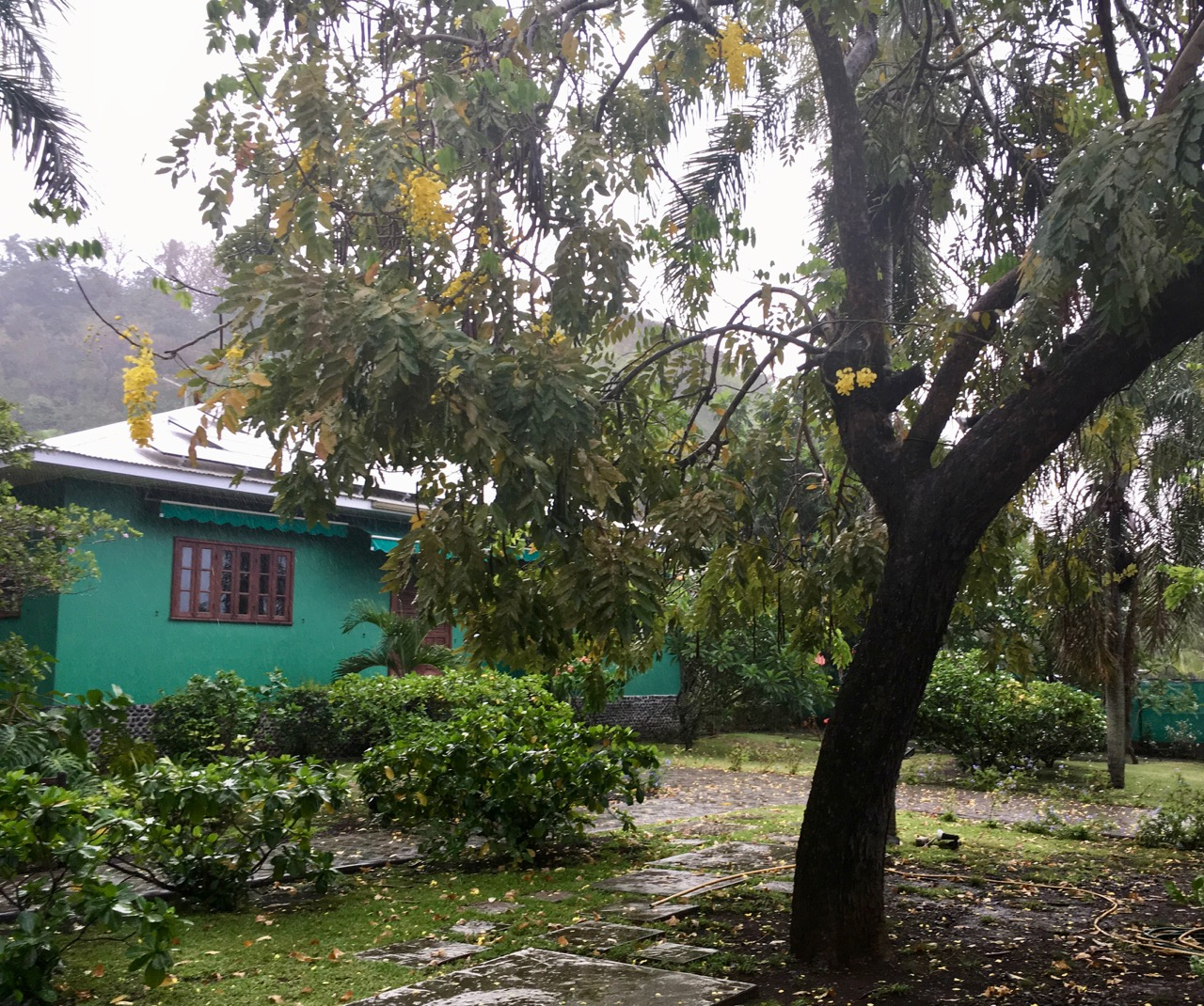
Hall's home and garden, now a historic house museum

In 1940, Hall published a book of poems titled Oh Millersville! under the pseudonym Fern Gravel. Written in the voice of a ten-year-old girl, the poems received critical acclaim. The literary hoax remained undisclosed until 1946, when Hall revealed the truth in his Atlantic Monthly article "Fern Gravel: A Hoax and a Confession.” He explained that the inspiration had come to him in a dream in which a young girl named Fern asked him to write down her poems. Upon waking, he recorded the verses, which offer simple yet vivid depictions of small-town life.

== Personal life ==
In 1925, Hall married Sarah “Lala” Winchester (born Sarah Marguerite Sophie Teraireia Winchester; 1909–1985), the daughter of a Tahitian mother and an English sea captain, giving her a half-Polynesian heritage. They had two children: the Academy Award–winning cinematographer Conrad Hall (1926–2003), and Nancy Ella Hall Rutgers (1930–2020). Hall died in Tahiti in 1951 and is buried on the hillside above the modest wooden house where he and Lala had lived for many years. His grave bears a line of verse he wrote in Iowa at the age of eleven: "Look to the Northward stranger / Just over the hillside there / Have you ever in your travels seen / A land more passing fair?"

== Legacy ==
Hall's papers, including manuscripts and wartime correspondence, are housed in the Special Collections and Archives at Grinnell College. His home in Arue, French Polynesia, was restored by the government of Tahiti and now serves as a historic house museum. The museum includes Hall's 3,000-volume library and personal arrifacts on loan from his family. "The house itself is neither large nor prepossessing; it was built for comfort and practicality," wrote author Peter Benchley. "It's what's inside the house that I found most fascinating: paintings, photographs, artifacts and anecdotes from Hall's preliterary life."

== Selected works ==
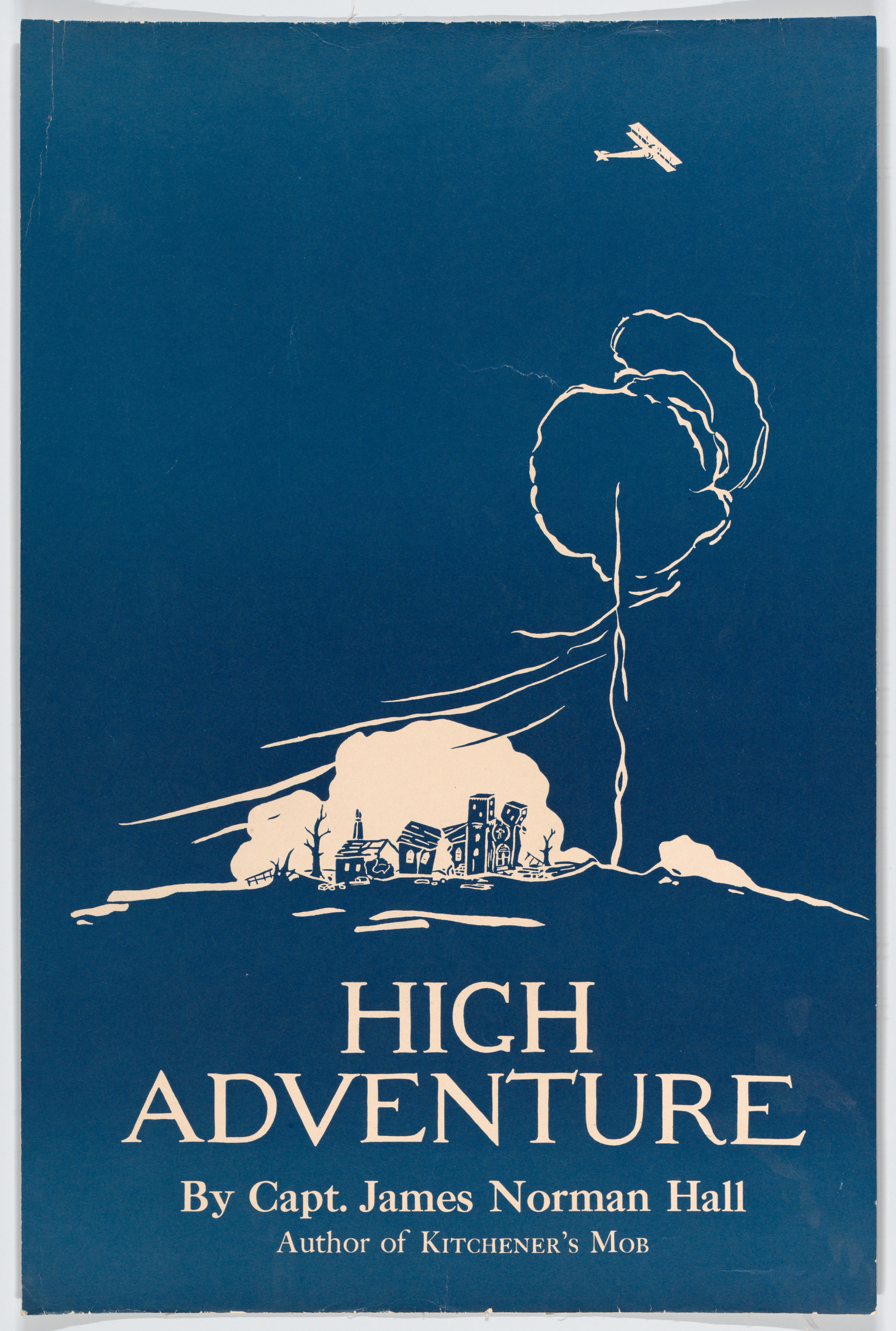
Edward Penfield poster for Hall's memoir, High Adventure: A Narrative of Air Fighting in France (1918)

=== The Bounty trilogy, with Charles Nordhoff ===
- Mutiny on the Bounty (1932)
- Men Against the Sea (1934)
- Pitcairn's Island (1934)
- The Bounty Trilogy (illustrated by N. C. Wyeth) (1940)

=== Other works ===
- Kitchener's Mob: The Adventures of an American in the British Army (1916) – Expanded from a series of articles first published in The Atlantic Monthly in 1916, recounting Hall’s early World War I experiences as a volunteer in the British Army.
- High Adventure: A Narrative of Air Fighting in France (1918) – Developed from Hall’s 1917–1918 articles in The Atlantic Monthly detailing his combat experiences as a pilot in the French air service.
- History of the Lafayette Flying Corps (with Charles Nordhoff) (1920)
- Faery Lands of the South Seas (with Charles Nordhoff) (1920)
- On the Stream of Travel (1926)
- Mid-Pacific (1928)
- Falcons of France (with Charles Nordhoff) (1929) – Nordhoff and Hall’s account of their service in the famed Lafayette Escadrille during World War I.
- Flying with Chaucer (1930)
- Mother Goose Land (1930)
- Tale of a Shipwreck (1934) – Hall recounts his voyage to Pitcairn Island and a shipwreck at Temoe in 1933. Originally published as the serial "From Med to Mum" in The Atlantic Monthly, March–July 1934. Includes early versions of passages later adapted into Pitcairn's Island.
- The Hurricane (with Charles Nordhoff) (1936)
- The Dark River (with Charles Nordhoff) (1938)
- Dictator of the Americas (1938)
- The Friends (1939)
- No More Gas (with Charles Nordhoff) (1940)
- Doctor Dogbody's Leg (1940)
- [as Fern Gravel] Oh Millersville! (Muscatine, IA: The Prairie Press, 1940)
- Botany Bay (with Charles Nordhoff) (1941)
- Under a Thatched Roof (essays) (1942)
- Men Without a Country (with Charles Nordhoff) (1942)
- Lost Island (1944)
- The High Barbaree (with Charles Nordhoff) (1945)
- A Word for His Sponsor: A Narrative Poem (1949)
- "Frisbie of the South Seas" (essay), The Atlantic Monthly, March 1949 – A tribute to Hall’s friend and fellow South Pacific writer, Robert Dean Frisbie.
- The Far Lands (1950) – First serialized in The Atlantic Monthly, the novel explores Polynesian migration and mythology.
- The Forgotten One and Other True Tales of the South Seas (1952)
- Her Daddy's Best Ice Cream (1952)
- My Island Home: An Autobiography (1952) – Portions of this memoir were first serialized in The Atlantic Monthly shortly before Hall’s death in 1951.
- "Sing: A Song of Sixpence" (essay), The Atlantic Monthly, December 1925; reprinted in 125 Years of The Atlantic (1977), pp. 303–313 – A lyrical essay reflecting on childhood and storytelling.

== See also ==
- The James Norman Hall House in Colfax, Iowa, is listed on the National Register of Historic Places.
- The James Norman Hall Papers are held by the Grinnell College Special Collections and Archives.
