= Passage to Marseille =

1944 film by Michael Curtiz

- Theatrical release poster
- Directed by: Michael Curtiz
- Screenplay by: Casey Robinson; Jack Moffitt
- Based on: Sans Patrie; 1942 novel by Charles Nordhoff; James Norman Hall
- Produced by: Hal B. Wallis
- Starring: Humphrey Bogart; Michèle Morgan; Claude Rains
- Cinematography: James Wong Howe
- Edited by: Owen Marks
- Music by: Max Steiner
- Production company: Warner Bros. Pictures
- Distributed by: Warner Bros. Pictures
- Release date: February 16, 1944
- Running time: 109 minutes
- Country: United States
- Language: English
- Budget: $2,332,000
- Box office: $3,786,000

Passage to Marseille, also known as Message to Marseille, is a 1944 American war film made by Warner Brothers, directed by Michael Curtiz. The screenplay was by Casey Robinson and Jack Moffitt from the novella Sans Patrie (Men Without Country) by Charles Nordhoff and James Norman Hall. The music score was by Max Steiner and the cinematography was by James Wong Howe.

Passage to Marseille uses a rare flashback within a flashback within a flashback. It opens at an airbase in England during World War II, with Free French Captain Freycinet telling a journalist how a particular group of French pilots came to be stationed there, including Matrac (Bogart). The second flashback reveals how the patriotic prisoners escaped a French penal colony at Cayenne in French Guiana. The third flashback establishes Matrac's romantic backstory and explains that he was framed for murder.

== Plot ==
In 1942, journalist Manning arrives at a British RAF base to learn about the Free French who are fighting the Germans. Along with Captain Freycinet, he watches as French bomber crews prepare for a raid. Manning's interest focuses on Jean Matrac, a gunner, and Freycinet describes Matrac's story:

Two years earlier, just before the defeat of France by the Germans, five men are found adrift in a small canoe in the Caribbean Sea by the tramp steamer Ville de Nancy. These five men—Marius, Garou, Petit, Renault, and their leader, Matrac—are rescued and taken aboard the French freighter commanded by Captain Malo. They initially claim to be French-Venezuelan miners returning home to fight for their motherland, but when confronted by Captain Freycinet, the five confess to being escaped convicts from Devil's Island—the French prison colony at Cayenne in French Guiana.

On Devil's Island, the convicts are recruited by Grandpère, an elderly patriotic ex-convict, to fight for France in her hour of need. The inmates recount Matrac's troubles in pre-war France to Grandpère to convince him that Matrac should lead the escape. Matrac's wife, Paula, discovered that he had been framed for murder to prevent his newspaper from voicing his opposition to the Munich Pact. As the escape unfolds, Grandpère volunteers to stay behind as their boat can only carry a certain weight.

By the time the Ville de Nancy nears the port of Marseille, France has surrendered to Nazi Germany, and a collaborationist Vichy government has been set up. Upon hearing the news, and after emotionally delivering it to his crew, Captain Malo secretly decides not to deliver his valuable cargo to the Germans and to instead divert to Britain. Pro-Vichy passenger Major Duval organizes an attempt to seize control of the ship, but is defeated, in great part due to the escapees. Another pro-Vichy traveler, Jourdain, manages to broadcast the ship's coordinates to a Nazi bomber that subsequently attacks the ship; the escapees shoot down the bomber, at the cost of Marius's life. When they reach England, the surviving convicts join the Free French bomber squadron.

As Freycinet finishes his tale, the squadron returns from its mission over France. Renault's bomber is delayed, as Matrac is allowed to drop a letter over his family's house in occupied France—maintaining ties with Paula and a son he has never met—before returning from each mission. Renault's bomber finally lands. It has been badly shot up, and Matrac has been killed. At Matrac's interment, Freycinet reads aloud Matrac's last, undelivered, letter to his son—a vision of the day when evil will have been defeated forever—and promises that the letter will be delivered.

== Cast ==
Jean Matrac (Bogart) in solitary confinement

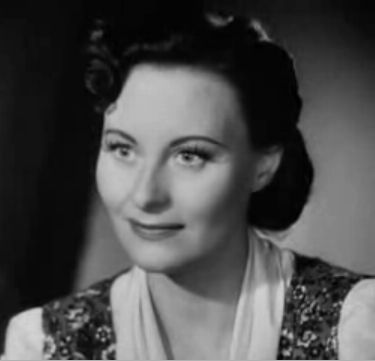
Paula Matrac (Morgan)

- Humphrey Bogart as Jean Matrac
- Claude Rains as Captain Freycinet
- Michèle Morgan as Paula Matrac
- Philip Dorn as Renault
- Sydney Greenstreet as Major Duval
- Peter Lorre as Marius
- George Tobias as Petit
- Helmut Dantine as Garou
- John Loder as Manning
- Victor Francen as Captain Patain Malo
- Vladimir Sokoloff as Grandpère
- Eduardo Ciannelli as Chief Engineer
- Corinna Mura as Singer

Uncredited

- Konstantin Shayne as 1st Mate
- Stephen Richards as Lt. Hastings
- Charles La Torre as Lt. Lenoir
- Hans Conried as Jourdain
- Monte Blue as 2nd Mate
- Billy Roy as Mess Boy
- Frederick Brunn as Bijou
- Louis Mercier as 2nd Engineer

== Production ==
According to Joseph D’Onofrio, writing for Turner Classic Movies (TCM),

Curtiz cast as many Europeans as possible, including several actors who had previously worked together on his masterpiece, Casablanca (1942)—Peter Lorre, Sydney Greenstreet, Helmut Dantine, Claude Rains, singer Corinna Mura and Louis Mercier. Humphrey Bogart and George Tobias were the only American actors in key roles, and they were playing Frenchmen. The script was based on a novella ... by Charles Nordhoff and James Norman Hall, the authors of Mutiny on the Bounty. It first appeared in The Atlantic Monthly and was purchased by Warner Bros. for $75,000–an astronomical sum for book properties in those days.

Like the book, the film features a flashback within a flashback within a flashback.

Michèle Morgan had been tested and strongly considered for the female lead for Casablanca.

Although exotic locales were called for, principal photography by cinematographer James Wong Howe actually took place at the Los Angeles County Arboretum and Botanic Garden in Arcadia, California.

The American Film Institute (AFI) and TCM report location shooting in Victorville, California.

Before Bogart began work on the film, pre-production had been underway for six months, but as a result of resisting Jack Warner's insistence on casting him in Conflict (released 1945, but shot in 1943), his starring role as Matrac was in jeopardy, with Jean Gabin being touted as a replacement. Even when the issue was decided, Bogart's portrayal was hampered by marital difficulties and a lack of commitment to the project. Joseph D’Onofrio states:

After much haggling and discourse, Bogart finally did Conflict which was little more than a mediocre melodrama and not one of Bogart's better films. But his agreement to do it allowed him to make Passage to Marseille and many other exceptional films at Warner Bros. like Key Largo (1948) so we can all be happy for Bogart's concessions that May day in 1943.

The flying sequences show the Free French Air Force (French: Forces Aériennes Françaises Libres, FAFL) using Boeing B-17 Flying Fortress bombers. The production took liberties with the actual bombing campaigns carried out by the Free French units, that primarily employed medium bombers such as the Martin B-26 Marauder. The use of the ubiquitous B-17 was due to its being recognizable to American audiences.

A scene showing Bogart's character, Matrac, machine-gunning the defenseless aircrew of a downed German bomber was cut by censors in foreign releases of the film.

== Reception ==
In his February 17, 1944, review Bosley Crowther of The New York Times noted:

Just five years ago, Warner Brothers swallowed its pride and discarded a film about penal conditions on Devil's Island because the French Government raised a howl. ... But now, in a manner of speaking, the studio's honor is being avenged ... For this tough and tempestuous melodrama is ...the studio's roaring rejoinder that a vicious and repressive penal code was still not sufficiently able to kill the love of home and freedom in French hearts. ... [The studio likely] picked this story for its frank, heroic elements alone. ... [It] tells the story, in a curiously roundabout way, of five jailbirds on Devil's Island who grow restive when they hear that France is at war. They are all of them victims of circumstance or of unjust, reactionary fates which are carefully explained ... The curious reversal of the narrative, whereby the story is told in single, double and even triple flashback, gives a certain confusion to the film ... [throwing] the continuity completely out of line. Also, the substance of the picture has a dubious, artificial quality. ... To state the matter bluntly, "Passage to Marseille" is a well-intentioned film with a lot of vicious action in it, but it never escapes from its own mechanical toils.

Writing for TCM in September 2002, D’Onofrio had a far more positive view of the film, stating:

[It] marked one of the few times the director strived for a realistic tone in his movies. The semi-documentary approach to several sequences and the unexpected deaths of two major characters were a departure from the cliched heroics of many studio-produced films of this era. More importantly, Passage to Marseille focused on the many sacrifices made by French citizens to accomplish their goal of once again making their native France a free nation. Employing an elaborate series of flashbacks, Curtiz shows us the personal side of their struggle, as well as the patriotic side. ... Curtiz was well known for his often dictatorial and gruff manner on movie sets and Passage to Marseille was no exception. ... However, Curtiz's perfectionism finally did pay off as the film features uniformly excellent performances and an evocative atmosphere ... Plus, the film was considered an artistic and financial success, with the box office returns showing a profit of well over a million dollars—a veritable bonanza for its day and age. [The equivalent of $18,407,727.27 in 2025.] It also didn't hurt that the movie served up morale-building propaganda in an entertaining fashion.

On Rotten Tomatoes, Passage to Marseille has a rating of 67% based on 6 modern reviews.

According to Warner Bros records, the film earned $2,157,000 domestically and $1,629,000 foreign.

== Bibliography ==
- Dolan, Edward F. Jr. Hollywood Goes to War. London: Bison Books, 1985. ISBN 0-86124-229-7.
- Hardwick, Jack and Schnepf, Ed. "A Buff's Guide to Aviation Movies". Air Progress Aviation, Vol. 7, No. 1, Spring 1983.
- Meyers, Jeffrey. Bogart: A Life in Hollywood. London: Andre Deutsch Ltd., 1997. ISBN 0-233-99144-1.
- Sperber, A.M. and Lax, Eric. Bogart. New York: William Morrow & Co., 1997. ISBN 0-688-07539-8.
