= Arue, French Polynesia =

Commune in French Polynesia, France

ʻĀrue
- Commune
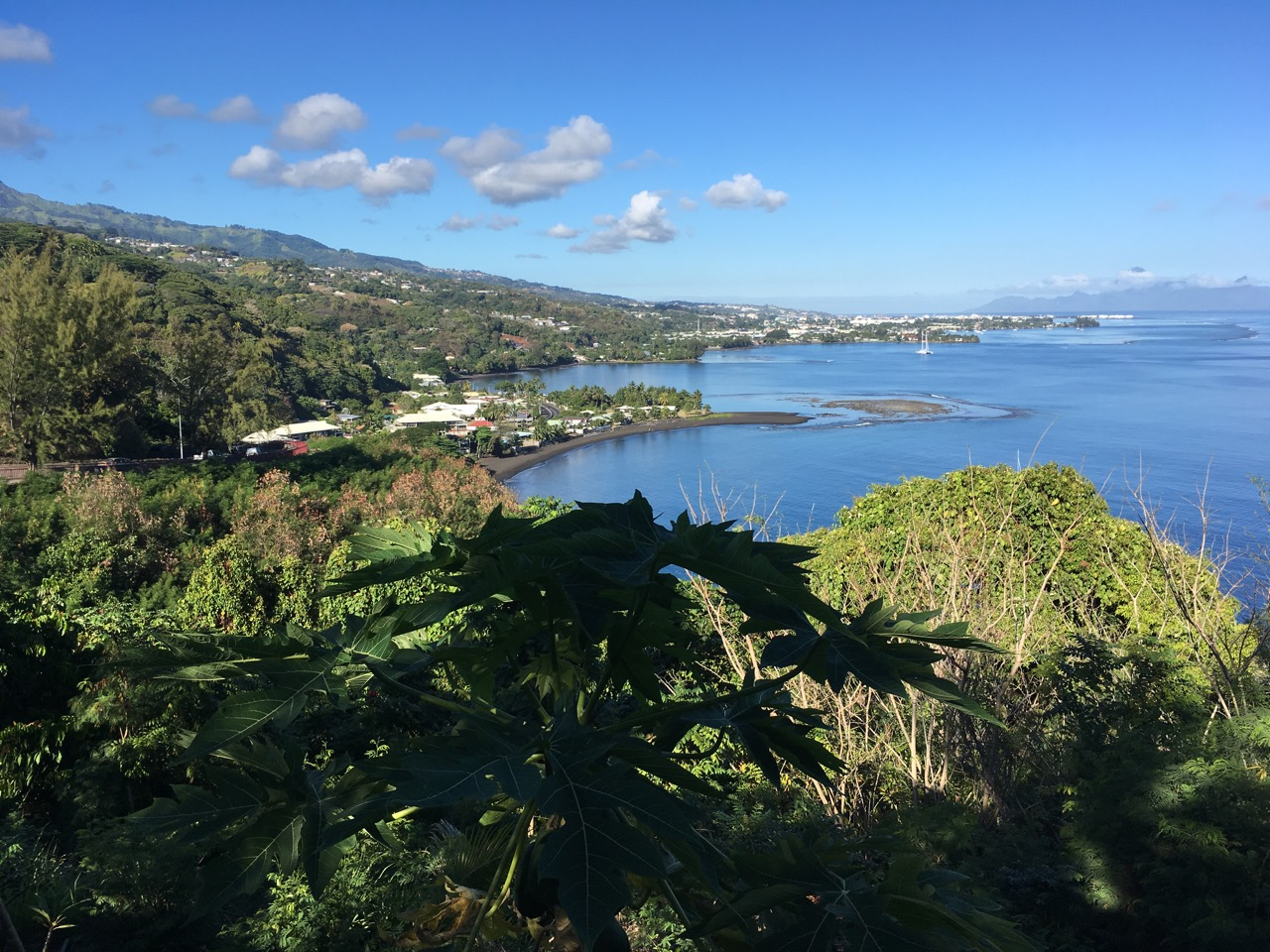
- The coastline of ʻĀrue, with Papeete on the horizon

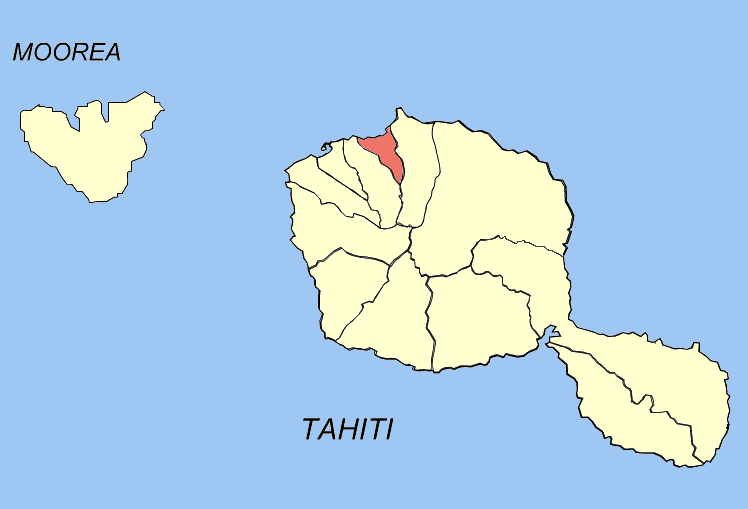
- Location of the commune (in red) within the Windward Islands. The atoll of Tetiaroa lies outside of the map.
- Location of ʻĀrue
- Coordinates: 17°30′58″S 149°30′42″W
- Country: France
- Overseas collectivity: French Polynesia
- Subdivision: Windward Islands

Government
  - Mayor (2022–2026): Teura Mare Iriti
- Area^{1}: 20.5 km^{2} (7.9 sq mi)
- Highest elevation: 1,305 m (4,281 ft)
- Lowest elevation: 0 m (0 ft)
- Population (2022): 10,322
  - Density: 504/km^{2} (1,300/sq mi)
- Time zone: UTC−10:00
- INSEE/Postal code: 98712 /98701
- ^{1} French Land Register data, which excludes lakes, ponds, glaciers > 1 km^{2} (0.386 sq mi or 247 acres) and river estuaries.

ʻĀrue is a commune in the suburbs of Papeete in French Polynesia, an overseas territory of France in the Pacific Ocean. Āru'e is located on the island of Tahiti, in the administrative subdivision of the Windward Islands, themselves part of the Society Islands. At the 2022 census it had a population of 10,322.

The commune of ʻĀrue includes the atoll of Tetiaroa, population 240 in 2017, (5.85 km^{2}/2.26 sq. miles; property of Marlon Brando's family), located 58 km (36 mi) north of Tahiti.

== History ==
The area of ʻĀrue was first settled by travelers from Asia during the year of 1000. They built houses out of grass and mud. The Polynesians hunted fish with spears. Captain James Cook arrived at Tahiti to observe the Transit of Venus.

The James Norman Hall Museum is located in ʻĀrue - it is a historic house museum that exhibits the home of the writer of The Bounty Trilogy as it was in 1951.
