= Botany Bay (film) =

1953 film by John Farrow

- Directed by: John Farrow
- Written by: Jonathan Latimer
- Based on: novel by Charles Nordhoff; James Norman Hall
- Produced by: Joseph Sistrom
- Starring: Alan Ladd; James Mason; Patricia Medina; Cedric Hardwicke
- Cinematography: John F. Seitz
- Edited by: Alma Macrorie
- Music by: Franz Waxman
- Color process: Technicolor
- Production company: Paramount Pictures
- Distributed by: Paramount Pictures
- Release date: October 7, 1953
- Running time: 94 minutes
- Country: United States
- Language: English
- Box office: $1.9 million (US)

Botany Bay is a 1953 American adventure film directed by John Farrow and starring Alan Ladd, James Mason and Patricia Medina. It was based on a novel of the same name by Charles Nordhoff and James Norman Hall.

While the story includes characters loosely based on real figures (Gilbert and Phillips) and the ship Charlotte, it is a largely fictional telling of the First Fleet's arrival in Australia in 1788.

== Plot ==
In 1787 a group of prisoners lodged in Newgate Jail receive notice that their death sentences are commuted to life imprisonment in New South Wales. They are boarded onto the Charlotte and joined by a smaller group of female prisoners. Gilbert, the captain, offers one pretty female prisoner, Sally, free run of the ship on certain conditions. He eventually approaches her romantically, but she keeps rebuffing him.

One prisoner, Tallant, admits guilt but is expecting a pardon to arrive within hours. The captain declines to wait for word of the pardon and Tallant jumps overboard. When caught he is sentenced to 50 lashes with a cat-o-nine-tails. Recovering below deck he offers £1000 to any person who agrees to help him. As Tallant has medical training, he is offered a position as ship's surgeon, which also gives him free run of the ship.

Gilbert is cruel to prisoners and crew alike. A young boy in a small cell dies of hypothermia when the cell floods with cold water, and is buried at sea. His mother tries to stab the captain, and he fatally shoots her. Tallant and the first mate, Spencer, escape in a row boat, but are found and sentenced to be keel hauled. The crew carries out the sentence, but both prisoners survive. Upset, the captain orders a second haul; Spencer dies on the second haul, but Tallant survives. Rev. Thynne threatens to inform Governor Philip of the barbarity when they arrive at Botany Bay.

The ship sails via Rio de Janeiro in South America and along the coast of Africa. They arrive in New South Wales after 237 days.

Governor Phillip refuses to hang Tallant and sentences him to hard labour in the penal colony in Botany Bay, New South Wales. However, Gilbert demands that Tallant be charged with mutiny. Despite the fact that the Mutiny Act 1703 only has provisions to punish members of the Royal Navy (which Tallant clearly is not, even were the Charlotte a Royal Navy ship), Governor Phillip raises no objection to this. Tallant escapes with a small group of men and tracks down Gilbert at Stillwater Cove. He demands the Charlotte, but he and his men are surrounded by British troops from the Charlotte and recaptured.

As a further twist, the group is surrounded by aborigines. Gilbert is hit by a spear and killed, but Tallant takes command and British firepower pushes them back. As the prisoners now have muskets, they take charge again, but as Tallant checks them for injuries, he notices plague swellings on some of the soldiers. Rather than escape, Tallant returns to Botany Bay and warns the governor of Charlotte's arrival, which would otherwise expose the colony to the fatal disease raging on board. With his timely warning, the crew and passengers can be treated; Tallant is pardoned and reunites with Sally.

== Cast ==
- Alan Ladd as Hugh Tallant
- James Mason as Captain Paul Gilbert
- Patricia Medina as Sally
- Cedric Hardwicke as Governor Arthur Phillip
- Jonathan Harris as Tom Oakly
- Malcolm Lee Beggs as Nick Sabb
- Murray Matheson as Rev. Mortimer Thynne
- Anita Sharp-Bolster as Moll Cudlip (billed as Anita Bolster)
- Noel Drayton as first mate Spencer
- Ben Wright as deck officer Green
- Skelton Knaggs prisoner at Newgate

== Production ==
=== Development ===
There was film interest in the book even before its publication because of the success of Mutiny on the Bounty, also from a novel by Nordhoff and Hall. The film rights were sold in July 1940 for a reported $50,000 and was intended to be a vehicle for Joel McCrea.

In 1941 Joel McCrea expressed interest in playing the lead. The film was originally planned to be made in 1946, starring Ray Milland with location shooting in Australia. However these plans were delayed when Paramount became concerned about the cost.

The project was re-activated in 1951 as a vehicle for Alan Ladd. It was inspired by the box office success of Two Years Before the Mast.

=== Shooting ===
Four koalas and two kangaroos were flown from Australia to appear in the film. The koalas were the first to be exported from Australia in 25 years and were later transferred to San Diego Zoo.

The only Australian-born members of the cast were Murray Matheson and Brandon Toomey. Aboriginal characters were played by African-American actors.

James Mason described the film in his memoirs as an example of "facile assembly work". He wrote he "made the interesting acquaintance of John Farrow, the director, who may well have been the only papal knight I ever ran into. I played the part of a ship’s captain who was given to acts of cruelty and Farrow was able to give me some useful hints."

The movie was the film debut for Jonathan Harris who described Farrow as "not an adorable man. Far from it! 1 don't believe he liked actors, you see, which is a very serious failing for a director.... This dreadful, dreadful man! Almost nobody escaped from that vitriolic and sly tongue." Harris said one day Farrow "verbally attacked James Mason on the set of the bridge of a full-size ship... Nothing happened and about twenty minutes later James said to Farrow, 'Did you say something to me, sir?' Farrow knew when he was licked. So, that was kind of joyous."

== Historical basis ==
A ship called Charlotte, under the command of Captain Thomas Gilbert, sailed with the First Fleet, but none of the events attributed to "Captain Paul Gilbert" in the film occurred in reality.

== Critical reception ==
Variety called it a "good subject for Alan Ladd's chest-baring heroics and Janies Mason's suave, calculating villainy."

Filmink called the film "fascinating for Australians – the simple fact that it was made, seeing Hollywood’s version of colonial Sydney on the backlot" but felt "it doesn’t really work as a drama – the story is “bitsy” and repetitive, with far too many escapes, recaptures, and floggings... In fairness to Paramount, and Nordhoff and Hall, the First Fleet was a little boring dramatically."

The movie was showing in a cinema in Vicksburg, Mississippi in December 1953 when a tornado hit, killing three children and injuring 22 inside the cinema.
