= Mount Vaea =

Mountain in Samoa, burial place of Robert Louis Stevenson

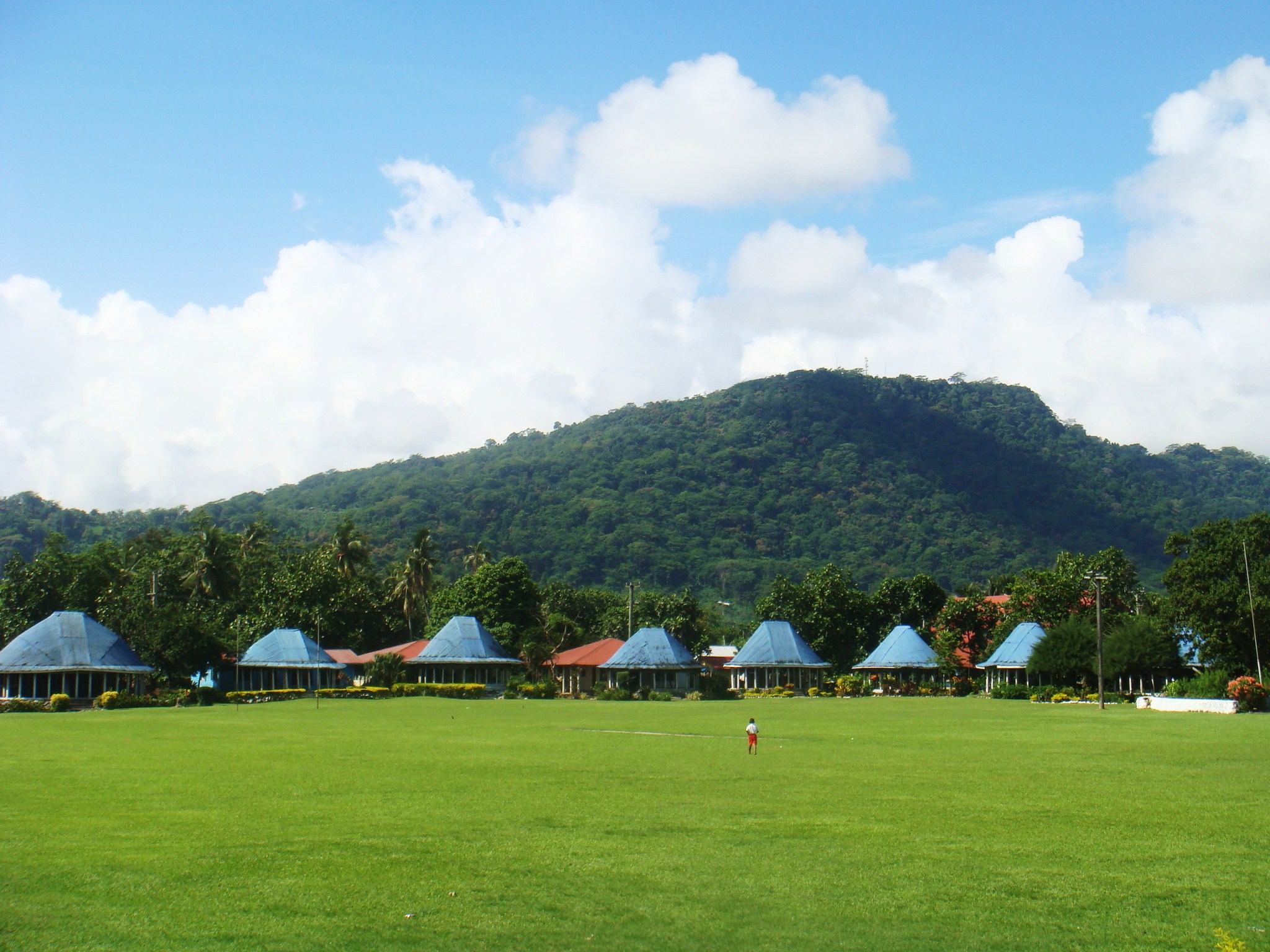
- View of Mt Vaea from Lepea village to the northwest.

Highest point
- Elevation: 472 m (1,549 ft)
- Prominence: 472 m (1,549 ft)
- Coordinates: 13°51′49″S 171°46′25″W

Geography
- Location within Samoa
- Location: Upolu, Samoa

Mount Vaea is a 472 m summit overlooking Apia, the capital of Samoa located on the north central coast of Upolu island. The mountain is situated south about 3 km inland from Apia township and harbour. The settlement at the foothills on the northern side of the mountain is called Lalovaea (below Vaea in Samoan).

== Connections to Robert Louis Stevenson ==
Mount Vaea is best known as the burial place of the Scottish writer and poet Robert Louis Stevenson, who lived the last four years of his life in Samoa before his death on 3 December 1894. Stevenson, who had lived on the east side of Mount Vaea, had chosen the mountain top as his final resting place. The day following his death, his coffin was carried by Samoans to the summit for burial. The steep path to his grave is called the 'Road of Loving Hearts.' It takes about an hour to ascend by foot. Stevenson was called Tusitala (Samoan language: tusi 'book', tala 'writer') by the people of Samoa.

Inscribed on Stevenson's tomb is his epitaph:

Under the wide and starry sky,
Dig the grave and let me lie.
Glad did I live and gladly die,
And I laid me down with a will.

This be the verse you grave for me:
Here he lies where he longed to be;
Home is the sailor, home from the sea,
And the hunter home from the hill.

The ashes of his wife Fanny Stevenson, who died in California in 1914, were taken back by her daughter to Samoa in 1915 and buried beside her husband. The bronze plaque for Fanny bears her Samoan name 'Aolele' (Flying Cloud in Samoan).

Stevenson's estate and colonial home, Villa Vailima, is now the Robert Louis Stevenson Museum in his honour. It is situated in the village of Vailima at the eastern foot of Mount Vaea.

== Memorial and Scenic Reserve ==
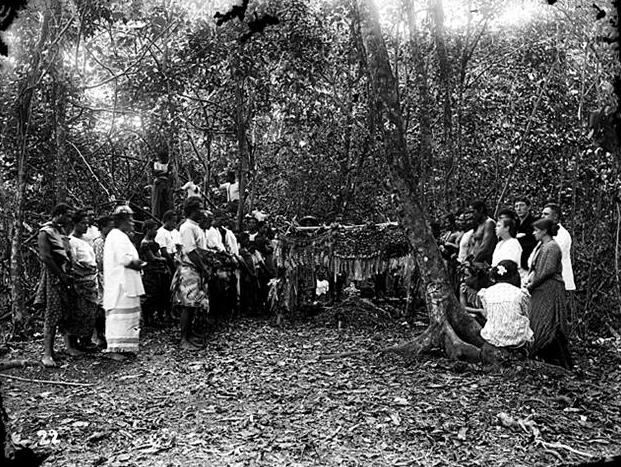
Stevenson's burial on Mount Vaea, 1894. Photo by Thomas Andrew.

Stevenson's memorial on Mount Vaea and more than 100 acres (0.40 km^{2}) from the estate are protected by law in Samoa through the Stevenson Memorial Reserve and Mount Vaea Scenic Reserve Ordinance 1958.

Part of the 1958 Law states;

- Certain lands on Mount Vaea which is the resting place of Robert Louis Stevenson formerly of Vailima (known to the people of Samoa as Tusitala), and of Fanny Stevenson, his wife, has been given to the Government of Samoa by the heir of the said Fanny Stevenson as a memorial to Robert Louis Stevenson.
- The lands described...shall be known as the Stevenson Memorial Reserve and shall be maintained in perpetuity by the Government of Samoa in memory of Robert Louis Stevenson and his love for the people of Samoa.
- ....the Mount Vaea Scenic Reserve shall be maintained in perpetuity by the Government of Samoa as a scenic reserve.

== See also ==
- Chanel College, Moamoa
