= Robert Louis Stevenson Museum =

Museum in Samoa

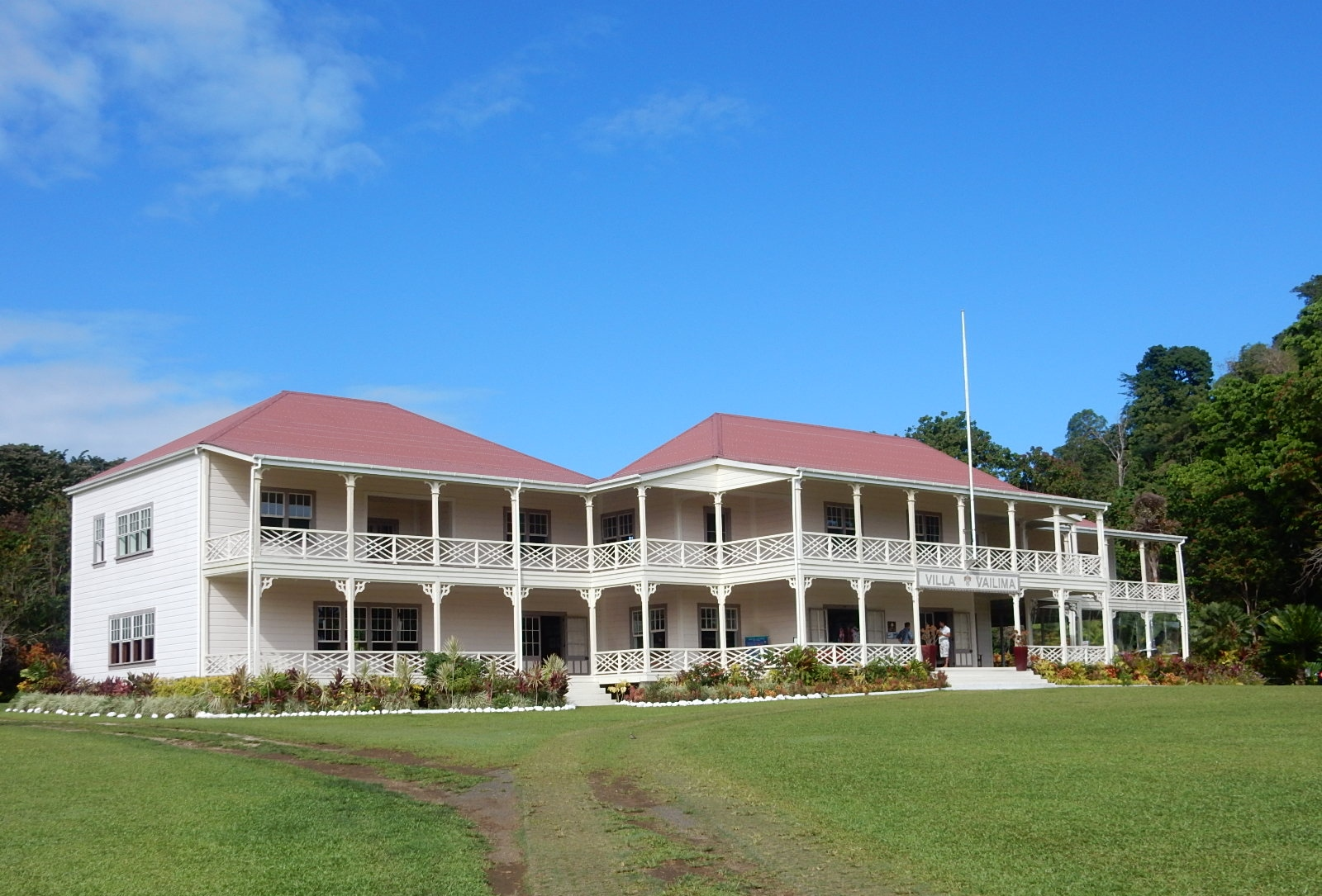
- Established: 5 December 1994
- Location: Samoa
- Founders: Jim Winegar; Tilafaiga Rex Maughan
- General Manager: Margaret Silva Felise
- Website: www.rlsmuseum.org

The Robert Louis Stevenson Museum is a museum in Samoa, which commemorates the life of the Scottish author Robert Louis Stevenson. The museum displays a curated version of his residence, as Stevenson lived in it. Its establishment was funded by overseas donations.

== Background ==
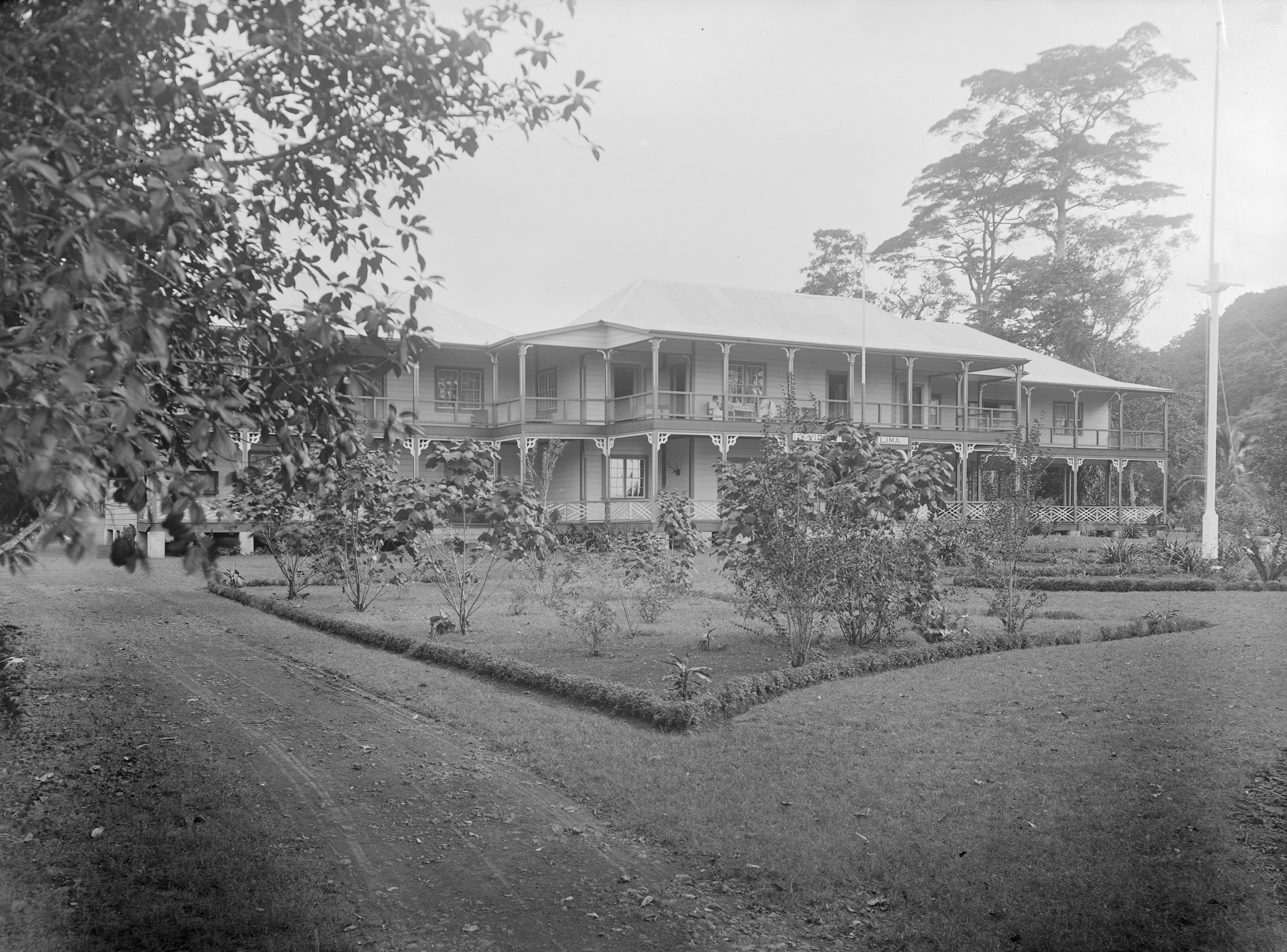
Villa Vailima in 1903, during its use as the residence of the governor of German Samoa

Robert Louis Stevenson was born in Edinburgh, but travelled widely and in 1888 he and his family began a three-year tour of the South Pacific, eventually settling in Samoa. In 1890 Stevenson purchased 314 acres (127 ha) of land and began to build a home there; by 1891 his mansion Villa Vailima was completed, named after the nearby village. The house had five bedrooms and a library, as well as the only working fireplace in Samoa. Art and furniture on display in the house included a nude by Rodin, given to Stevenson by the artist, a tablecloth gifted by Queen Victoria and a piano. Stevenson was popular with the local community, who gave him the nickname Tusitala or "Teller of Tales". He was critical of colonial rule in Samoa and supported Samoan indigenous political interests. Stevenson died in 1894 and was buried overlooking his home at the top of Mount Vaea.

When Stevenson died in 1894, the villa was no longer used by the family and was used as the official residences of the governor of German Samoa, then later by the New Zealand territorial administrator, and, subsequently, by the Samoan head of state. The villa was badly damaged by cyclones in the early 1990s.

== Museum ==
After a period of renovation, the building opened on 5 December 1994 as the Robert Louis Stevenson Museum. The museum was founded by American businessmen and Mormon missionaries Jim Winegar and Tilafaiga Rex Maughan. Funds for the foundation of the museum came from donations from outside Samoa. The museum is run by a board, which includes two representatives from the government of Samoa.

The museum appeals to Anglophone visitors, many familiar with English literature. In 2003, 86 per cent of visitors were foreign tourists.

=== Collection ===
The museum is dedicated to the life and legacy of Robert Louis Stevenson and the collection is made up of material and objects relating to his life. The house is presented as if Stevenson was still alive and guided tours are run daily. However, little of the collection is original and Winegar and Maughan purchased many pieces, either as authentic period pieces, but with no association with Stevenson, or replicas. Stevenson's grave on Mount Vaea can also be accessed from the museum.

==== Overseas collections ====
Most of the photography relating to Stevenson's life in Samoa is held at the Writer's Museum in Edinburgh, Scotland. This museum also holds guns which Stevenson used in Samoa, as well a collection of sea shells and Samoan ethnographic objects which he acquired there.

== Reception ==
Whilst Stevenson was anti-colonial in his stance, his presence and ability to move to the island is in itself part of settler colonialism. The museum is a significant institution within Samoa's heritage industry, since it acts as a lens through which colonial histories of Samoa can be examined.

== Gallery ==
=== Gallery of contemporary photography of museum ===
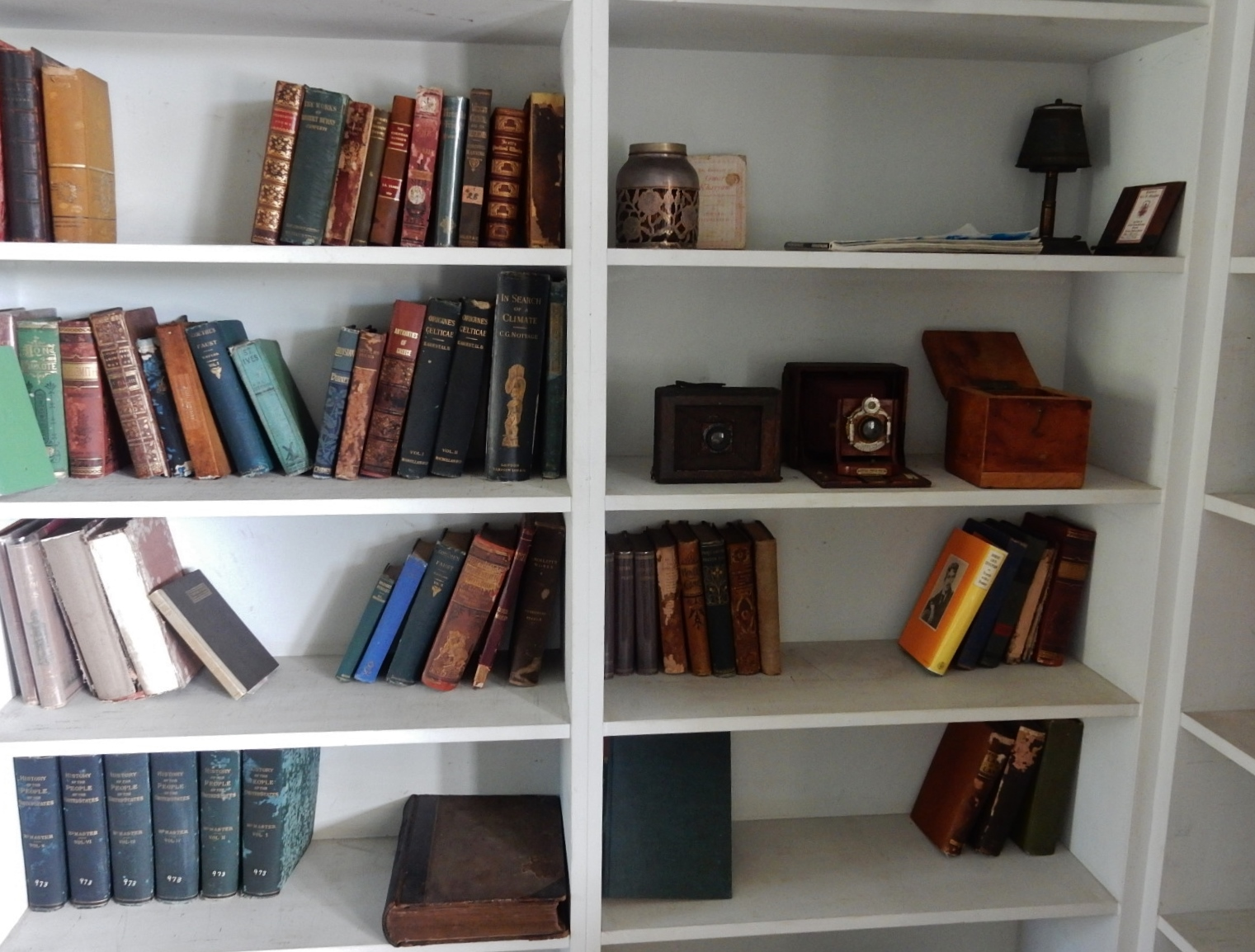
Shelves of Stevenson's books in the museum, 2016.

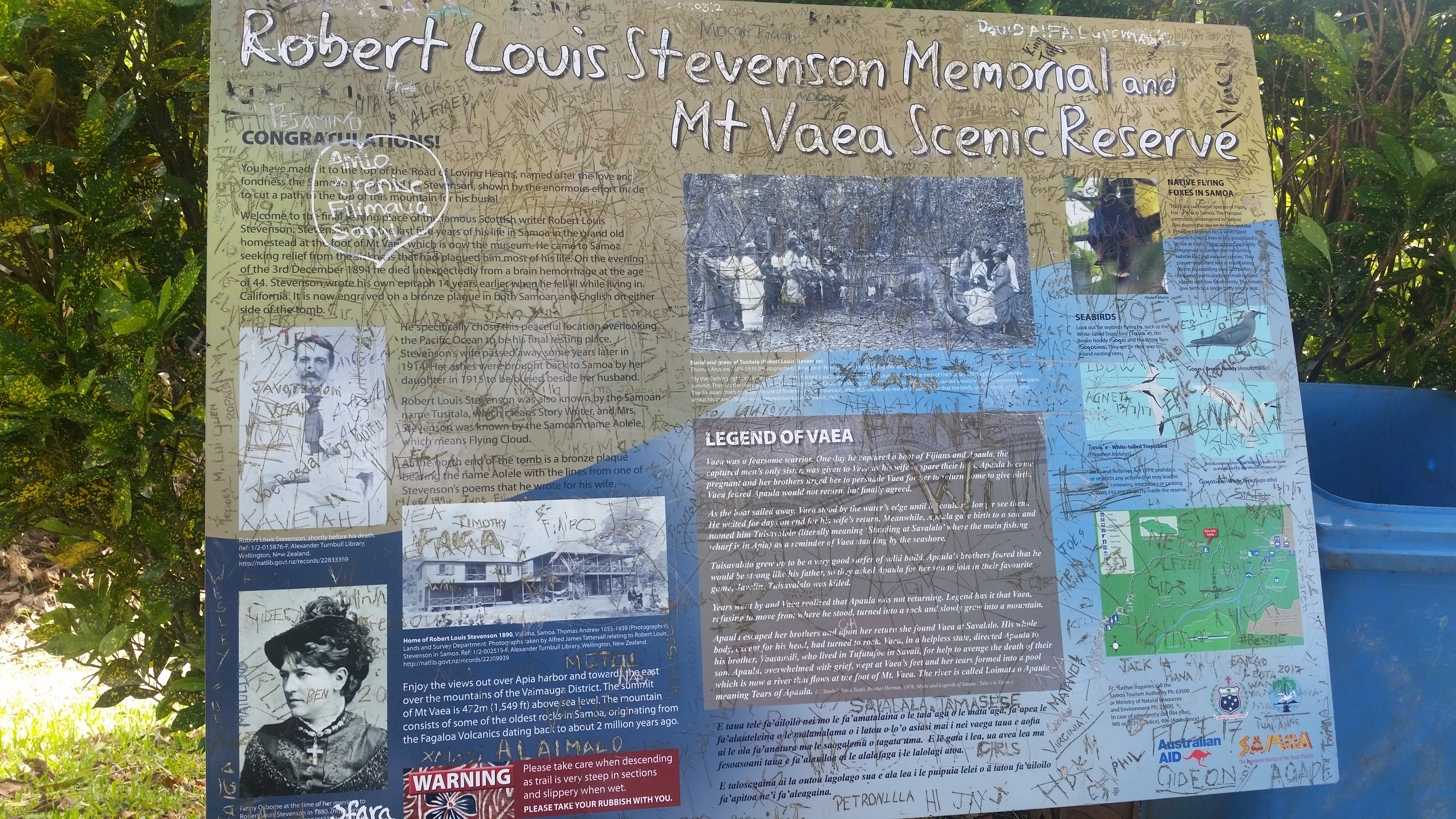
Interpretation board at Mount Vaea, with graffiti.

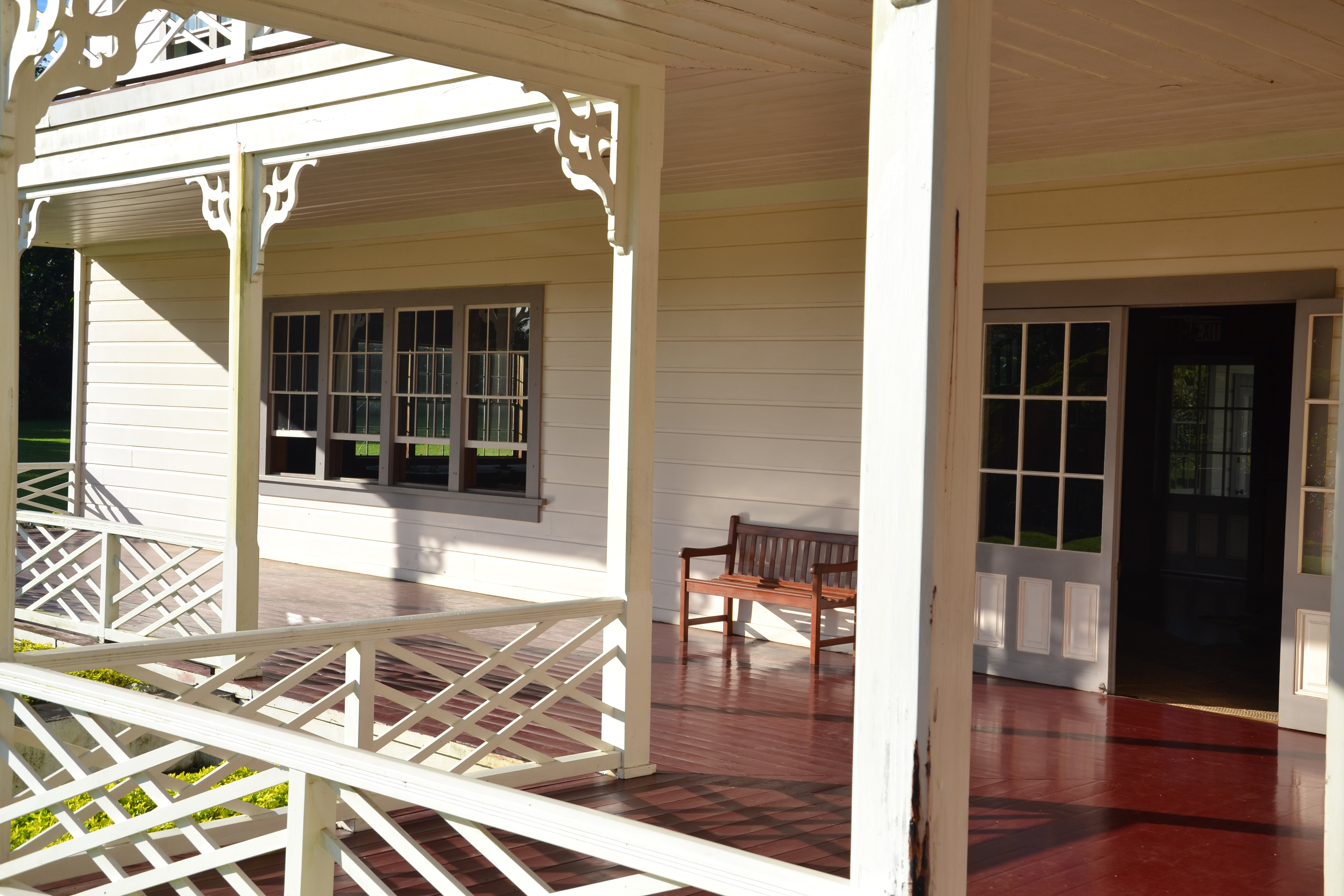
Veranda

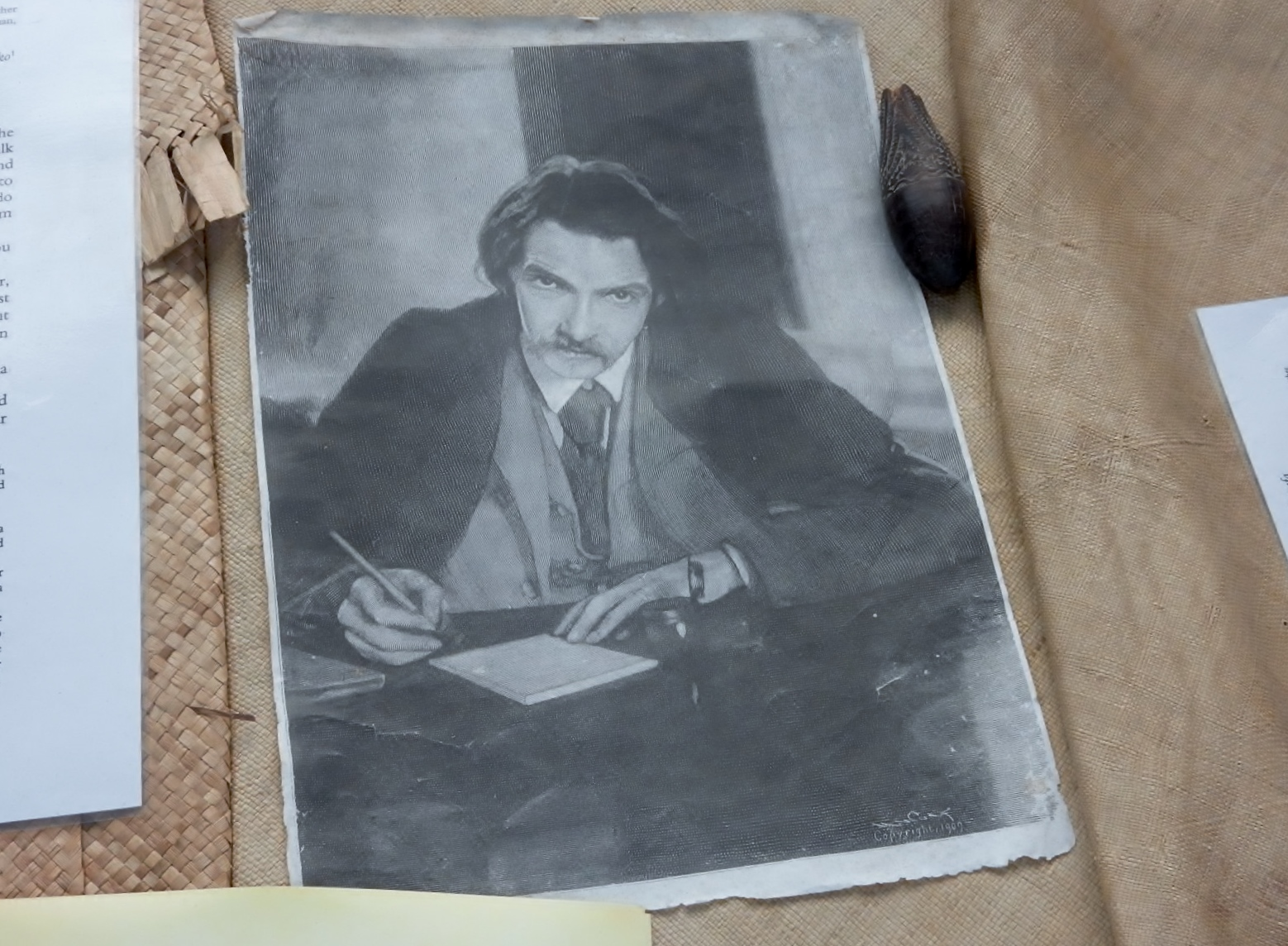
Photograph of Stevenson on display at museum, note traditional cloth background, 2016.

=== Gallery of historic photography of Stevenson at Villa Vilaima ===
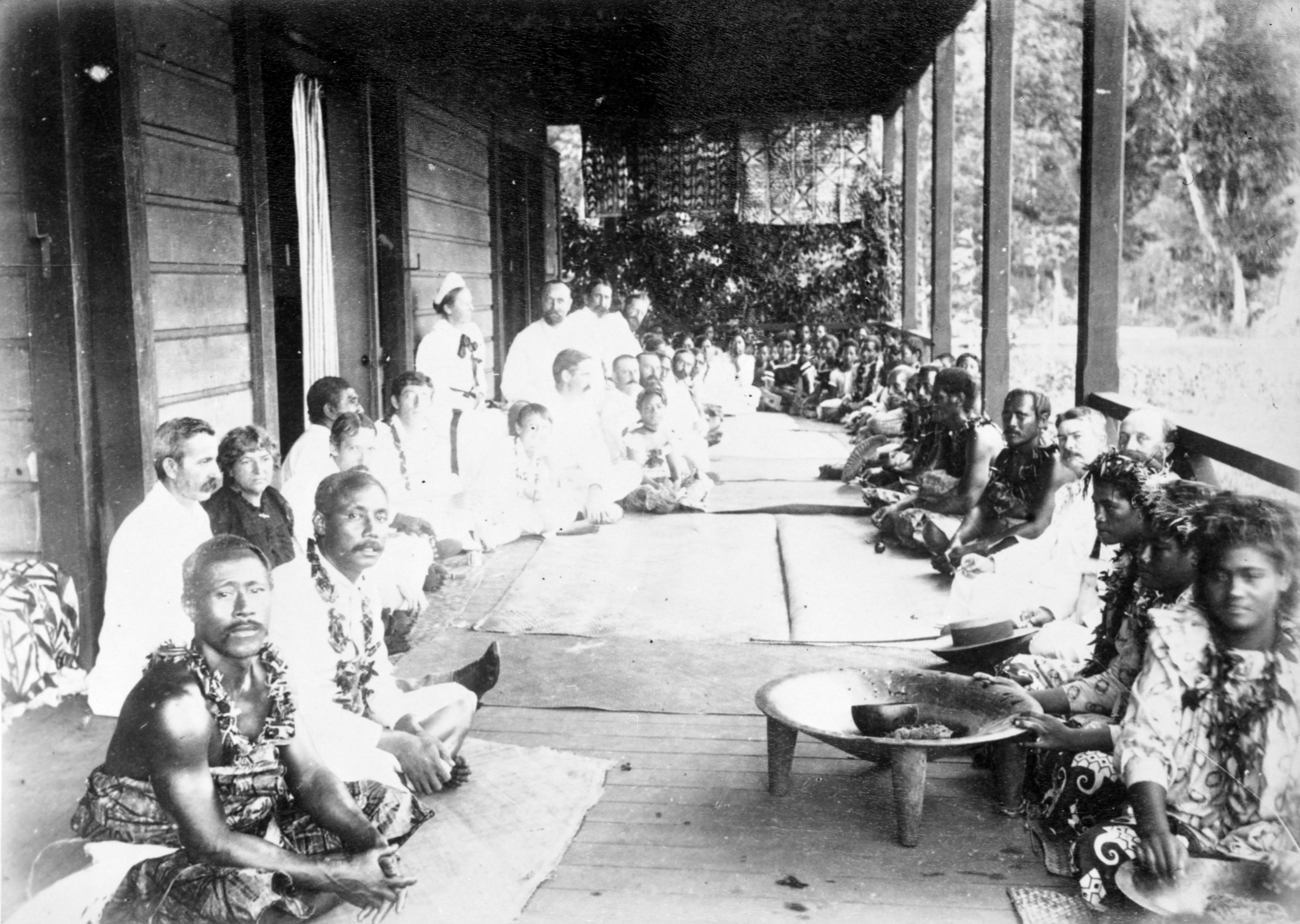
Robert Louis Stevenson's birthday party, at Vailima, c.1893

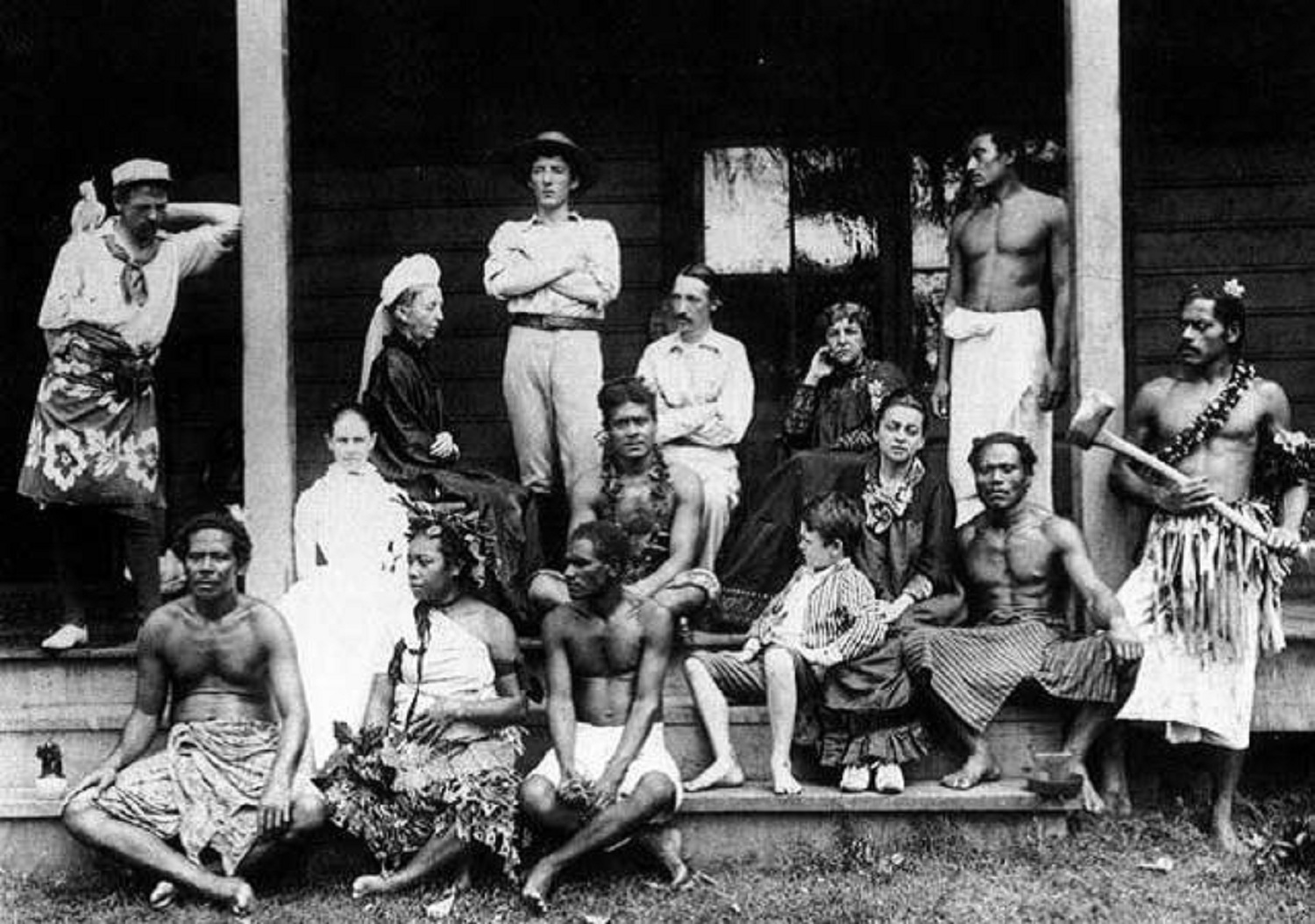
Stevenson family and servants, Vailima, 31 July 1892.

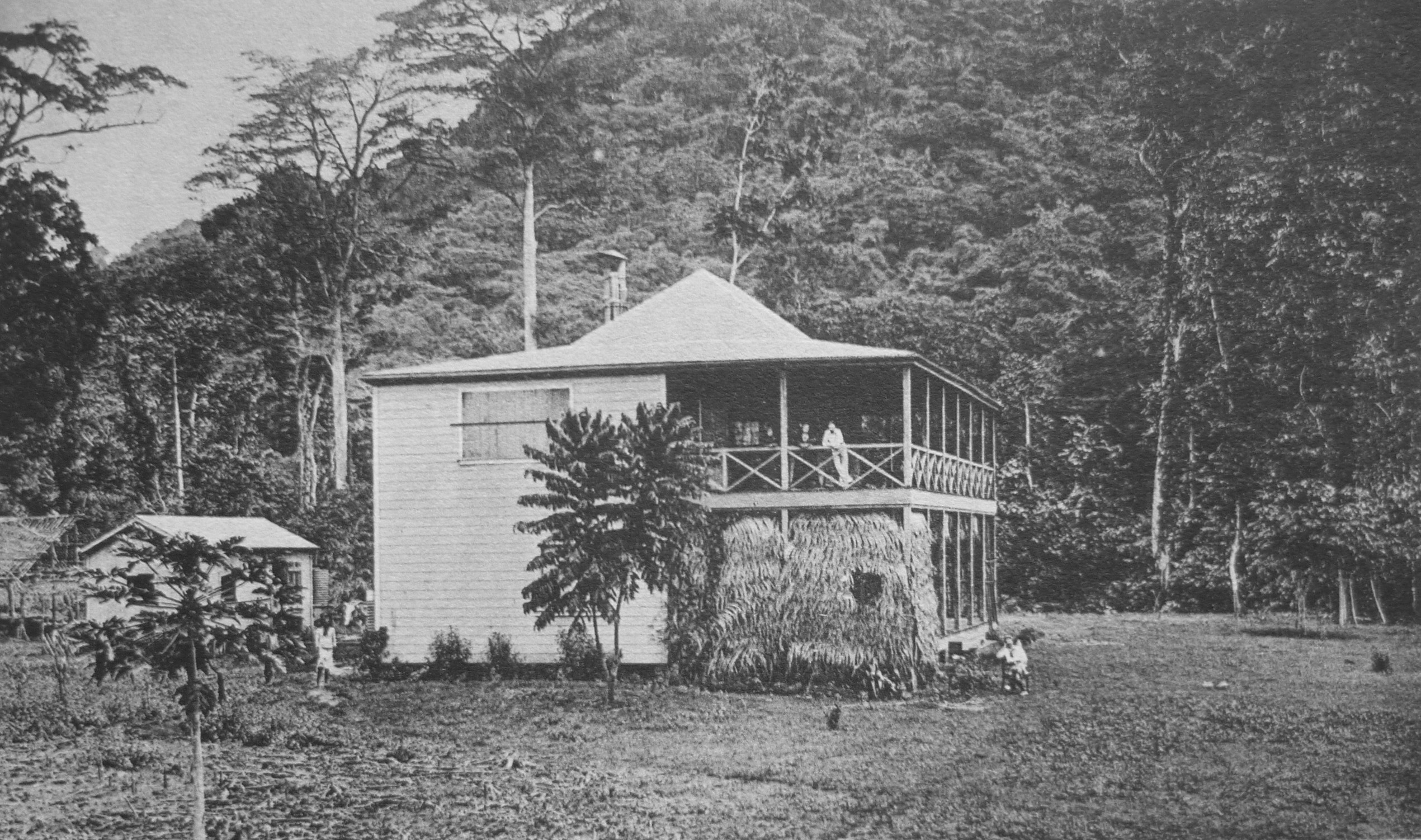
Stevenson's home at Vailima, prior to extension.

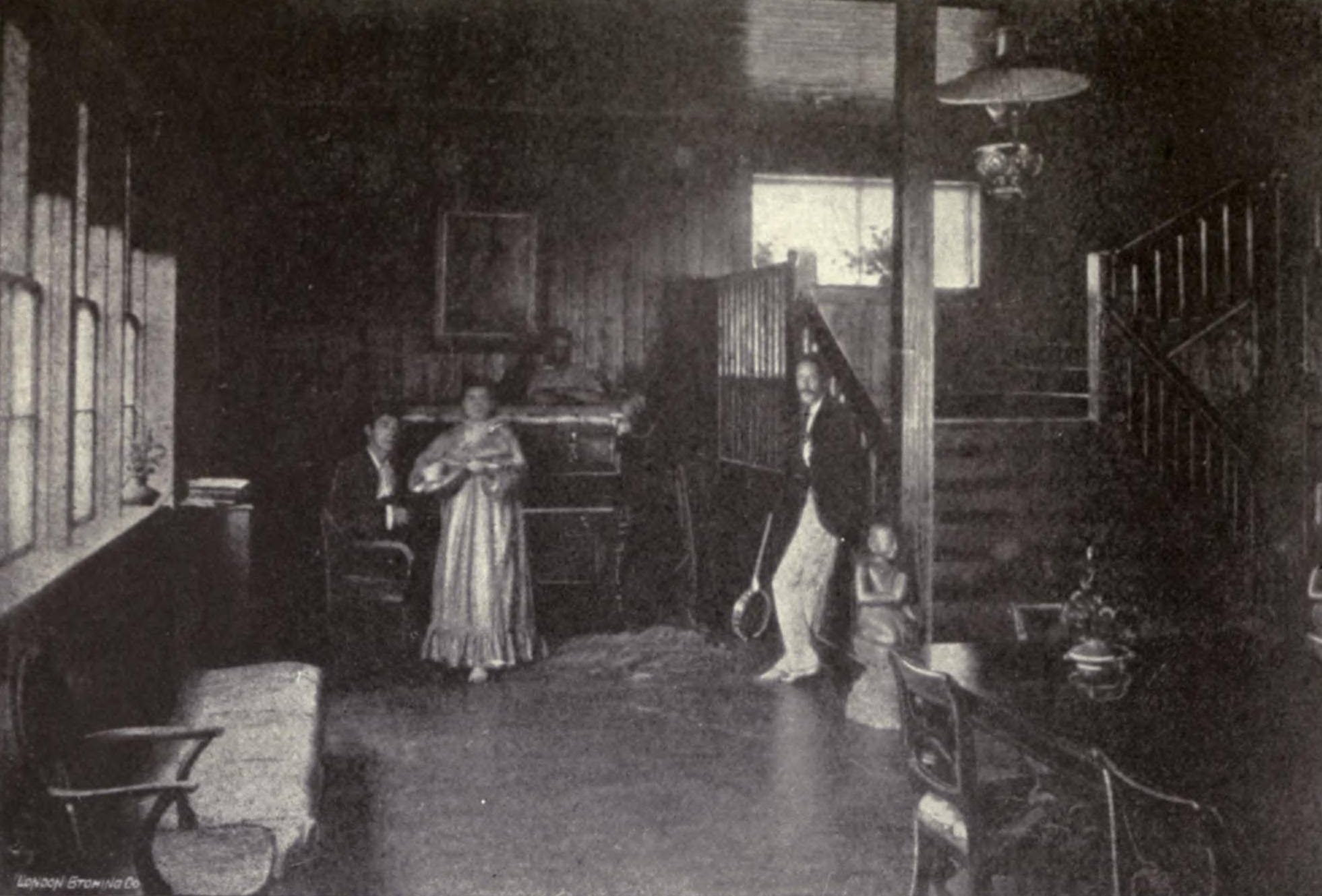
The staircase, Vailima

== See also ==
- James Norman Hall Museum
