= Men Against the Sea =

1933 novel by Charles Nordhoff and James Norman Hall

- First edition
- Author: Charles Nordhoff and James Norman Hall
- Language: English
- Series: The Bounty Trilogy
- Genre: Historical novel
- Publisher: Little, Brown and Company
- Publication date: 1934
- Publication place: United States
- Media type: Print (Hardcover and Paperback)
- Preceded by: Mutiny on the "Bounty"
- Followed by: Pitcairn's Island

Men Against the Sea is the second novel in the trilogy by Charles Nordhoff and James Norman Hall about the mutiny aboard HMS Bounty. It is preceded by Mutiny on the Bounty and followed by Pitcairn's Island. The novel first appeared in serial form in The Saturday Evening Post from November 18, 1933 through December 9, 1933, hence the copyright date of 1933. It was first printed in hardcover in January 1934 by Little, Brown and Company.

== Plot summary ==
Men Against the Sea follows the journey of Lieutenant William Bligh and the eighteen men set adrift in an open boat by the mutineers of the Bounty. The story is told from the perspective of Thomas Ledward, the Bounty's acting surgeon, who went into the ship's launch with Bligh. It begins after the main events described in the novel and then moves into a flashback, finishing at the starting point.

== Principal characters ==
- Lieutenant William Bligh, Acting Captain
- John Fryer, Sailing Master
- Thomas Ledward, Acting Surgeon
- David Nelson, Botanist
- William Cole, Boatswain
- William Elphinstone, Master's Mate
- William Purcell, Carpenter
