= Pitcairn's Island (novel) =

1934 novel by Charles Nordhoff and James Norman Hall

- First edition cover
- Author: Charles Nordhoff and James Norman Hall
- Language: English
- Series: The Bounty Trilogy
- Genre: Historical fiction
- Publisher: Little, Brown and Company
- Publication date: 1934
- Publication place: United States
- Media type: Print (Hardcover and paperback)
- Preceded by: Mutiny on the Bounty and Men Against the Sea

Pitcairn's Island is the third installment in the fictional trilogy by Charles Nordhoff and James Norman Hall about the mutiny aboard HMS Bounty. It is preceded by Mutiny on the "Bounty" and Men Against the Sea. The novel was first serialized in The Saturday Evening Post, beginning in the 22 September 1934 issue, then published in 1934 by Little, Brown and Company.

== Synopsis ==
Chapters I–XV and the epilogue are told in the third person, while chapters XVI–XXI are recounted by John Adams.

After two unsuccessful attempts to settle on the island of Tubuai, the Bounty mutineers return to Tahiti, where they part company. Fletcher Christian and eight of his men, together with eighteen Polynesians, sail from Tahiti in September 1789, and for a period of eighteen years nothing is heard of them. Then, in 1808, the American sailing vessel Topaz discovers a thriving community on Pitcairn Island under the rule of "Alexander Smith" (the assumed name of John Adams, the only survivor of the fifteen men who had landed there so long before).

== Reception ==
New York Times reviewer P. H. wrote in November 1934, "Messrs Nordhoff and Hall have done a remarkably fine, imaginative recreation, which, although lacking in places, is on the whole a weirdly living thing."

The Saturday Review also gave a favorable review, writing that the authors had "built a plausible, three-dimensional human story".

The Atlantic magazine described it as one of "three first-class sea stories" and noted that the first printing was of 25,000 copies.
