= Vailima, Samoa =

Village in Samoa

Vailima
- Village
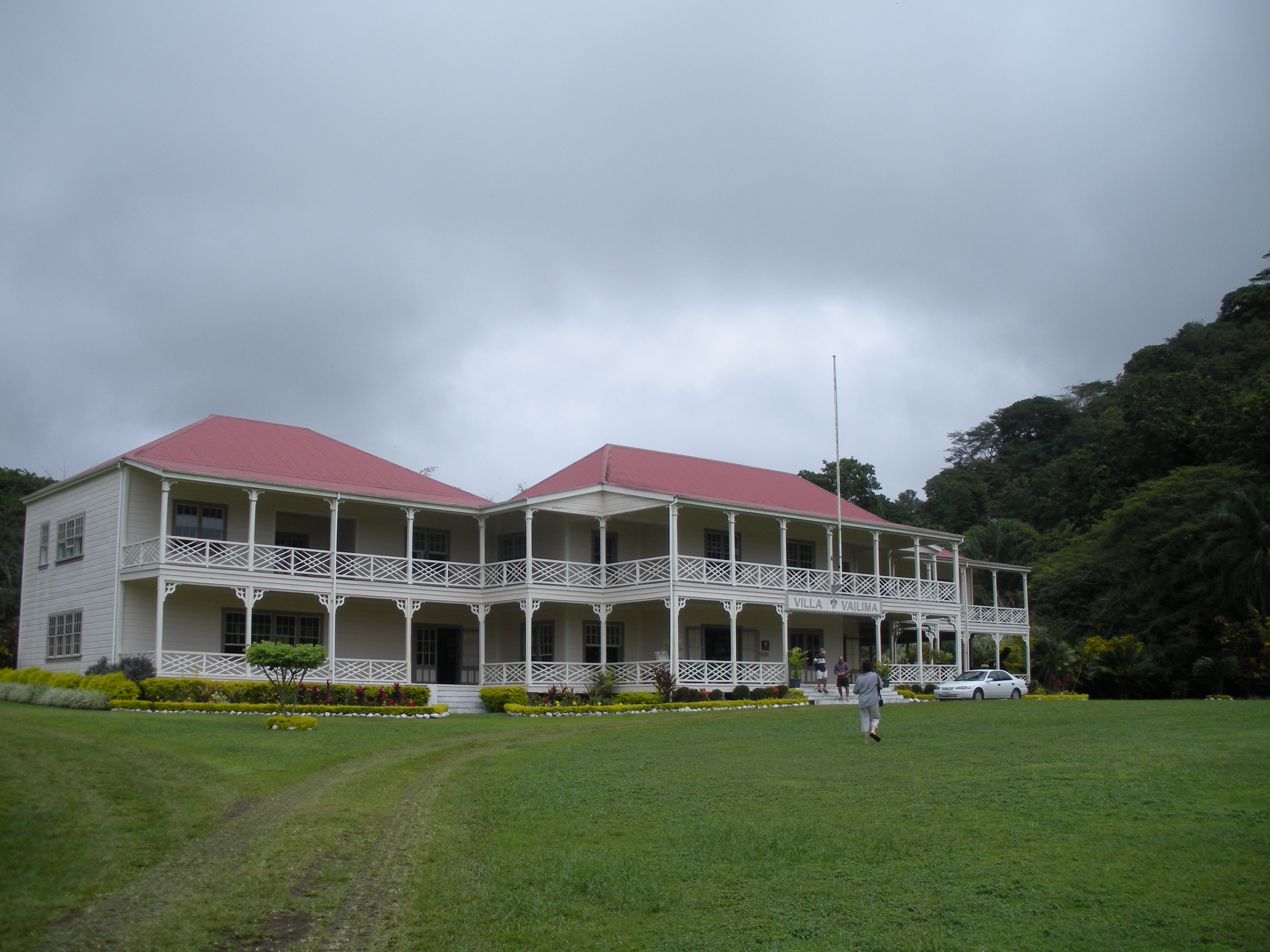
- Villa Vailima

- Location within Samoa
- Coordinates: 13°51′55″S 171°45′42″W
- Country: Samoa
- District: Tuamasaga

Population (2016)
  - Total: 769
- Time zone: -11

Vailima is the name of a village on the island of Upolu, about four miles south of Apia, the capital of Samoa, the island nation in the Pacific Ocean. The population is 769. Vailima is part of the electoral political district of Tuamasaga.

== Origins ==
The name Vailima means "water in the hand", according to an old Samoan tale. A woman gave some water (vai) in her hand (lima) to help her thirsty companion. A widely quoted misinterpretation states that the name means "five waters", as the word lima also means "five" in Samoan.

== Connections with Robert Louis Stevenson ==
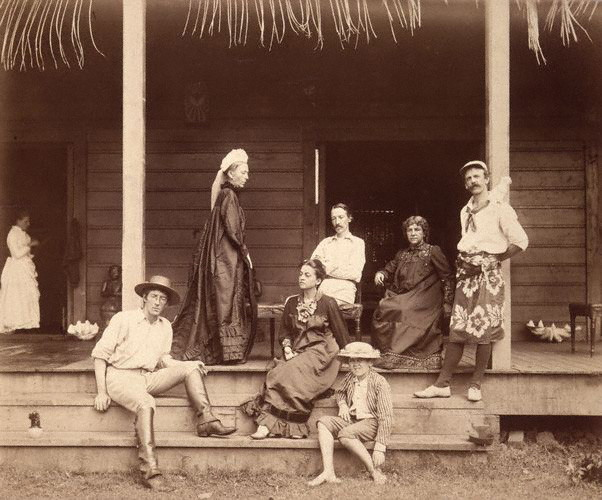
Stevenson family and friends, Vailima

The village is most known as the location of the last residence of Robert Louis Stevenson, named "Villa Vailima", which is now the Robert Louis Stevenson Museum. The estate has had a varied past with it functioning further as the residence for the governor of German Samoa, the administrator of the New Zealand mandatory authority and the head of state of independent Samoa. It is now a museum in honour of Stevenson and has been substantially restored.

Stevenson is buried in a tomb on Mount Vaea overlooking Vailima. He had two wishes for his burial, to be buried on the top of Mount Vaea and to be buried with his boots on as he used those boots to walk on the Samoan lands.

== Secretariat of the Pacific Regional Environment Programme (SPREP) ==
Vailima is the location of the headquarters of the Secretariat of the Pacific Regional Environment Programme (SPREP).
