= Charles Nordhoff =

American novelist (1887–1947)

Charles Bernard Nordhoff
- Born: February 1, 1887; London, England
- Died: April 10, 1947 (aged 60); Santa Barbara, California, US
- Occupations: Novelist, memoirist
- Writing career
- Period: 1919–1947
- Genre: Adventure fiction
- Subject: War memoir

Charles Bernard Nordhoff (February 1, 1887 – April 10, 1947) was an American novelist and traveler, born in England. Nordhoff is perhaps best known for The Bounty Trilogy, three historical novels he wrote with James Norman Hall: Mutiny on the Bounty (1932), Men Against the Sea (1934) and Pitcairn's Island (1934). During World War I, he served as a driver in the Ambulance Corps as well as an aviator in both the French Air Force's Lafayette Flying Corps and the United States Army Air Service, reaching the rank of lieutenant. After the war, Nordhoff spent much of his life on the island of Tahiti, where he and Hall wrote a number of successful adventure books, many adapted for film.

== Biography ==
=== Early life ===
Charles Nordhoff was born in London, England, on February 1, 1887, to American parents. His father was Walter Nordhoff, a wealthy businessman and author of The Journey of the Flame penned under the name "Antonio de Fierro Blanco". His mother, Sarah Cope Whitall, was of Pennsylvania Quaker stock. Nordhoff's parents returned to the United States with him in 1889, living first in Pennsylvania, then Rhode Island, and finally settling in California by 1898.

Charles Bernard Nordhoff's grandfather was Charles Nordhoff, a journalist and author of non-fiction books. Nordhoff himself showed an early interest in writing. His first published work was an article in an ornithological journal, written in 1902 when he was just fifteen. After attending The Thacher School in Ojai, California, he entered Stanford University at seventeen, but transferred after one year to Harvard.

After graduation in 1909, Nordhoff worked for his father's businesses, first spending two years in Mexico managing a sugar plantation, then four years as an executive of a tile and brick company in Redlands, California. He quit in 1916, signed up with the Ambulance Corps, and traveled to France. There he joined other American expatriates as a pilot in the Lafayette Flying Corps. He finished World War I as a lieutenant in the United States Army Air Service.

=== Writing career ===
After leaving the service, Nordhoff remained in Paris, France, where he worked as a journalist and wrote his first book, The Fledgling. In 1919, he and another former Lafayette Squadron pilot, James Norman Hall, who was also an author and journalist, were asked to write a history of that unit. Neither man had known the other during the war. Their first literary collaboration, The Lafayette Flying Corps, was published in 1920.

The two authors then returned to the United States, sharing a rented house on Martha's Vineyard, until given a commission by Harper's Magazine to write travel articles set in the South Pacific. They went to Tahiti in the Society Islands for research and inspiration, and ended up staying, Nordhoff for twenty years, Hall for life. Their second book, Faery Lands of the South Seas, was serialized in Harper's in 1920–21, then published in book form.

Nordhoff married a Tahitian woman, Christianne Vahine Tua Tearae Smidt, with whom he had four daughters and two sons. He wrote novels on his own for ten years, of which The Derelict (1928) was considered his finest solo effort. Nordhoff and Hall continued to jointly write travel and adventure articles for The Atlantic during the 1920s and early 1930s. They also co-authored another memoir of World War I, Falcons of France (1929). It was Hall who suggested they work on The Bounty Trilogy: Mutiny on the Bounty (1932), Men Against the Sea (1934) and Pitcairn's Island (1934).

Nordhoff, who wrote in the mornings and spent the afternoons fishing, once explained how he and James Hall worked together. They initially drew up charts of all the characters, then doled out the chapters to each other. For their joint works they each made an effort to write in the other's style so as to achieve a reasonably smooth narrative.

After The Bounty Trilogy, Nordhoff and Hall's most successful book was The Hurricane (1936). They continued their partnership writing novels until 1945. Nordhoff produced one more solo book, In Yankee Windjammers (1940), a retelling of the ships, sailors, and way of life about which his grandfather had written.

=== Later life ===
Nordhoff divorced his first wife in 1936, left Tahiti a few years later, and returned to California, where in 1941 he married Laura Grainger Whiley. During World War II, he had the honor of having a Liberty ship, SS Charles Nordhoff, built in Portland, Oregon, in 1943, named after him.

Charles Bernard Nordhoff died alone at his home in Montecito, California, on April 10, 1947. His body was found the next morning by Tod Ford, who had called on him to work on their book. Newspapers at the time reported the death as an "apparent heart attack". Later sources indicate he had been drinking heavily, was depressed, and may have committed suicide. He is buried in the Redlands, California, Hillside Memorial Park Cemetery.

== Selected works ==
- The Fledgling, 1919
- The Lafayette Flying Corps, with James Norman Hall, 1920
- Faery Lands of the South Pacific, with James Norman Hall, 1921
- Picarò, 1924
- The Pearl Lagoon, 1924
- The Derelict, 1928
- Falcons of France, with James Norman Hall, 1929
- The Bounty Trilogy, with James Norman Hall
  - Mutiny on the Bounty, 1932
  - Men Against the Sea, 1933
  - Pitcairn's Island, 1934
- The Hurricane, with James Norman Hall, 1936
- The Dark River, with James Norman Hall, 1938
- No More Gas, with James Norman Hall, 1940
- In Yankee Windjammers, 1940
- Botany Bay, with James Norman Hall, 1941
- Men Without Country, with James Norman Hall, 1942
- High Barbaree, with James Norman Hall, 1945

== Film treatments ==
The Nordhoff–Hall books were the source for both the 1935 and the 1962 MGM films, Mutiny on the Bounty. The 1984 film, The Bounty, was based on other sources, more well-researched views of the actual events of 1789 in which the mutiny results not from maltreatment by Captain Bligh but from the lure of South Pacific life for the ship's crew.

In addition to the Bounty story, five other books by Nordhoff, all of them collaborations with James Norman Hall, were turned into films. (The screenplays were all written by other writers).

- The Hurricane (1937) directed by John Ford, was based on the novel of the same name. It was re-made in 1979.
- The Tuttles of Tahiti (1942) with Charles Laughton, was based on the novel No More Gas.
- Passage to Marseille (1944) directed by Michael Curtiz and starring Humphrey Bogart, was based on Men Without Country.
- High Barbaree (1947) with Van Johnson and June Allyson was based on the novel of the same name.
- Botany Bay (1953) with Alan Ladd and James Mason, was adapted from the novel of the same name.

== See also ==
- List of ambulance drivers during World War I
