= Mutiny on the Bounty (novel) =

1932 book by Charles Nordhoff and James Norman Hall

- First edition dustcover
- Author: Charles Nordhoff and James Norman Hall
- Language: English
- Series: The Bounty Trilogy
- Genre: Historical novel
- Publisher: Little, Brown and Company
- Publication date: October 1932
- Publication place: United States
- Media type: Print (hardback & paperback)
- Followed by: Men Against the Sea

Mutiny on the Bounty is a 1932 novel by Charles Nordhoff and James Norman Hall, based on the mutiny against Lieutenant William Bligh, commanding officer of the Bounty in 1789. It has been made into several films and a musical. It was the first of what became The Bounty Trilogy, which continues with Men Against the Sea (1933), and concludes with Pitcairn's Island (1934).

== Plot ==
The novel tells the story through a fictional first-person narrator by the name of Roger Byam, based on a crew member Peter Heywood. Byam, although not one of the mutineers, remains with the Bounty after the mutiny. He subsequently returns to Tahiti and is eventually arrested and taken back to England to face a court-martial. He and several other members of the crew are eventually acquitted.

=== Characters ===
- Roger Byam – main protagonist, loosely based on the life of midshipman Peter Heywood; but with differences in the book it is claimed that Byam's only living relative was his mother who died of shock after William Bligh had accused her son of being an active mutineer; in fact, Heywood had several siblings; his mother survived his court-martial- although his sister Nessy Heywood did die a year after his acquittal
- William Bligh – Lieutenant and commander of the Bounty
- Fletcher Christian – eventual mutineer

== Film, TV and theatrical adaptations ==
- Mutiny on the Bounty (1935)
- Mutiny on the Bounty (1962)
- Mutiny! a 1985 West End show written by and starring David Essex.

== Other ==
An earlier work, Les Révoltés de la Bounty (The Mutineers of the Bounty), was published by Jules Verne in 1879.

== See also ==
- 1932 in literature
