= The Bounty Trilogy =

1932–1934 Three books by Charles Nordhoff and James Norman Hall

- First (1936) edition
- Author: Charles Nordhoff, James Norman Hall
- Language: English
- Publisher: Little, Brown and Company
- Publication date: 1936
- LC Class: PZ3.N764 Bo

The Bounty Trilogy is a book comprising three novels by Charles Nordhoff and James Norman Hall. It relates events prior to, during and subsequent to the Mutiny on the Bounty.

The three novels, previously published separately, are:—

- Mutiny on the Bounty, first published 1932.
- Men Against the Sea, first published 1933.
- Pitcairn's Island, first published 1934.

The Bounty Trilogy was first published in 1936 by Little, Brown and Company, with a new preface by the authors and included vignette decorations by Henry Pitz. This edition used the plates from the original novels and had 903 pages.

In 1940 a new edition was published by Little, Brown and Company, with illustrations by N C Wyeth. This edition used new plates and because of the use of a smaller font, and smaller margins, and other space saving techniques, the pages in this edition were reduced from 903 pages to 691 pages. Nordhoff and Hall added a paragraph to their preface.

In 1953 a School Edition was prepared by Florence Doerr Jones and published by the Globe Book Company of New York. This version of The Bounty Trilogy is an abridgment and does not preserve the dimensions of the original publication. In addition to abridging the trilogy, the number of characters was reduced, and the vocabulary was simplified wherever possible.
