= Queensland Museum Tropics =

Museum in Townsville, Queensland, Australia

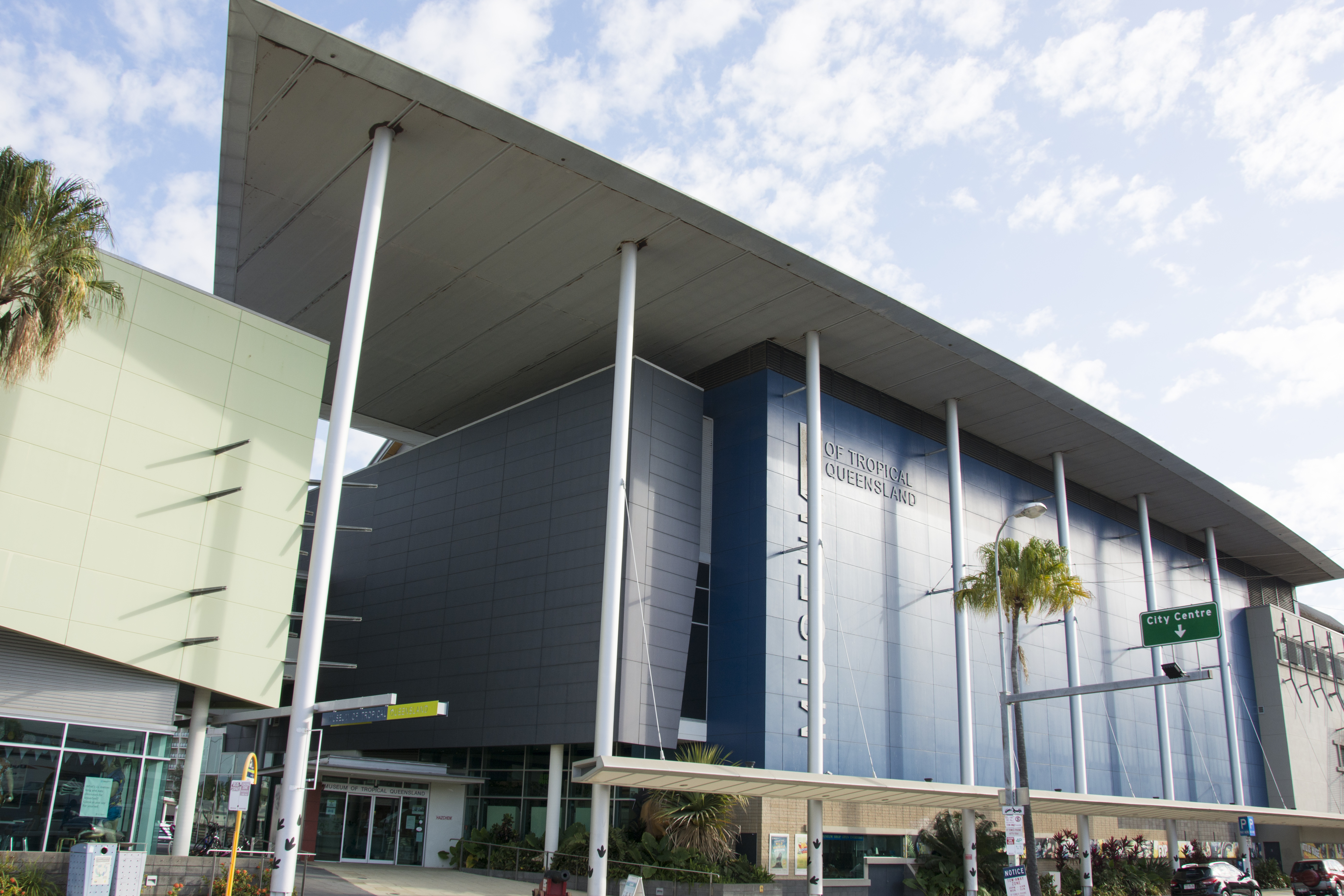
- Former name: Museum of Tropical Queensland
- Established: 1987
- Location: Townsville, Queensland, Australia
- Coordinates: 19.2574°S 146.8221°E
- Type: Natural history, maritime archaeology
- Website: www.museum.qld.gov.au/tropics

Queensland Museum Tropics (formerly Museum of Tropical Queensland) is located in Townsville, Queensland, Australia. Queensland Museum Tropics delivers a snapshot of North Queensland with galleries telling the stories of World Heritage-listed rainforests, reefs and HMS Pandora, the ship sent to capture the Bounty mutineers.

The museum also explores life in the tropics from prehistoric times to the modern-day. The diverse range of exhibitions and displays has a focus on natural and cultural history, biodiversity and human science. It is part of the Queensland Museum Network.

== History ==
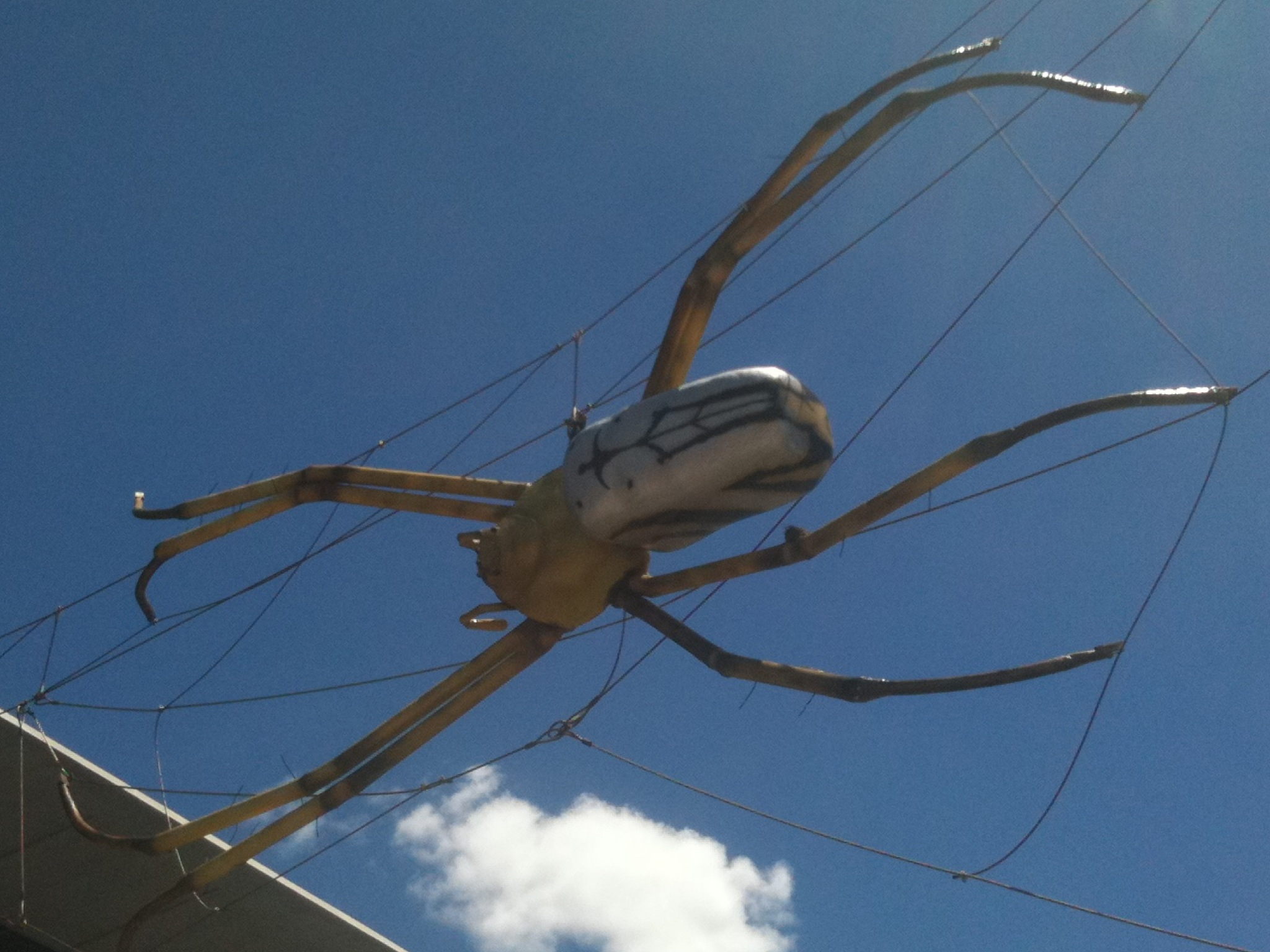
Spiderella – The giant spider on the front of the museum

Queensland Museum Tropics was first opened in 1987 along Ross Creek in Townsville's CBD. At the time it was named "Queensland Museum, North Queensland Branch".

In 1990, it officially adopted the name "Museum of Tropical Queensland" to reflect the museum's focus on researching and interpreting the cultural and natural heritage of tropical Queensland.

Due to the strong interest in the HMS Pandora expeditions (one of Australia's most significant shipwrecks) and widespread support from the Townsville community, the Pandora Foundation and government, fundraising efforts ensured the development of a new purpose-built museum on the site of the original, to house and display the artefacts that were recovered from the Pandora wreck site.

In 2000, the new museum was opened which included a 1:1 replica of the bow of the Pandora as homage to the wreck, a dedicated Pandora Gallery and additional two levels of galleries and exhibition spaces. The museum also became home to extensive coral, biodiversity, maritime and cultural collections that now form part of the State Collection of Queensland.

== Research ==
Scientists in the museum have gained international recognition in various fields, particularly those with marine themes.

=== Maritime archaeology ===
Queensland Museum's maritime archaeology collection holds over 8,000 artefacts from approximately 25 shipwrecks along the Queensland coast and Great Barrier Reef.

A significant portion relates to the excavated artefacts from the maritime archaeological excavation of HMS Pandora (1779) shipwreck. As well as other notable sites like Foam (1893), Scottish Prince (1887), HMCS Mermaid (1829) and SS Yongala (1911). Museum of Tropical Queensland houses artefacts recovered from the wreck of Pandora, one of the most significant wrecks in Australian waters. The Pandora sank off the coast of north Queensland in 1791 after capturing some of the participants in the infamous mutiny on the Bounty.

The museum has a broad research focus for maritime archaeology. Primarily, the focus is on understanding the collection and learning more about shipwrecks through the material culture the museum holds.

Current research focuses on the unidentified shipwrecks within the collection: the shipwrecks that have been found but their name and identity remain a mystery. The museum is investigating ways to learn more about when and where these ships were built through analysis of copper alloy artefacts discovered on the shipwrecks. In addition, the museum is piecing together archival material to put a name to unidentified shipwrecks along the coastline.

=== Aboriginal Cultures ===
Queensland is unique in being the ancestral home to two First Nations groups. The First Nations collections embody the rich history and living culture of both Aboriginal peoples and Torres Strait Islander peoples. The First Nations collection is rich in the stories it tells and relates to culture, language, ceremony and technology. Queensland Museum Network is custodian to more than 22,000 objects in the Queensland Aboriginal collection, as well as more than 28,000 items from outside of Queensland and over 12,000 historic photographs.

The Aboriginal cultures collection spans centuries. Some of the oldest items were made by Ancestors well before the 1880s. More recent additions to the collections have been purchased from First Nations artists and communities who create innovative works and draw on both traditional and contemporary styles, designs and techniques in their art practice. These collections represent the diversity of Aboriginal cultures across the state.

Recent additions to the Aboriginal cultures collection includes works by Bindal, Wulgurukaba and Wakka Wakka artist Niketa Law, and Yidinji artist Paul Bong (Bindur-Bullin).

Queensland Museum prioritises collaboration with First Nations communities to research and interpret the collections that are in our care. By recentring and recording First Nations voices, language and stories, these collections can be appropriately cared for and shared with communities and audiences.

Current research with First Nations collections at Queensland Museum investigates how museums can continue to decolonise the collections, by emphasising the agency of Traditional Owners and Knowledge holders. Collections and Research staff across the museum network are also collaborating on ways to incorporate First Nations knowledge into broader fields of research – in areas such as cultural and social history, biodiversity and geoscience.

==== Townsville Aboriginal and Torres Strait Islander Cultural Centre (TATSICC) Collection Project ====
Since 2005, the TATSICC has been a collaborative space, showcasing the significant history, living culture and heritage of Townsville's Aboriginal and Torres Strait Islander peoples.

In 2020, the collection of historic and contemporary objects showcased at the Cultural Centre was relocated to a new temporary home: Museum of Tropical Queensland. At the request of TATSICC the collection will remain in the care of the museum until a new cultural centre is established in Townsville.

=== Corals ===
Queensland Museum holds one of the world's largest and most scientifically important collections of reef corals (over 57,000 registered coral specimens as of 2026). While the collection includes a large number of specimens from Queensland's iconic Great Barrier Reef, it includes specimens from around world, particularly the Indo-Pacific. By comparing specimens collected from the Great Barrier Reef to those collected from other reef regions, such as Western Australia, Indonesia or the South Pacific, we can learn how distinct the Great Barrier Reef's corals are from those elsewhere in the world.

Queensland Museum conducts research on the taxonomy, systematics, biogeography, ecology and evolution of corals. A robust taxonomy that accurately reflects patterns of biodiversity underpins virtually all aspects of biological and conservation science. For example, the capacity to accurately identify species is critical for understanding how the changing environment is affecting the diversity and abundance of corals, and for informing management on everything from permit compliance to the effectiveness of interventions designed to assist recovery of degraded reefs.

=== Palaeontology ===
Queensland Museum has been a centre for research on Australian dinosaurs since the 1920s, with the excavation and naming of the first dinosaur to be found in Queensland: the sauropod Rhoetosaurus. Despite a century of study, Queensland's Mesozoic rocks are only just beginning to give up their secrets. Numerous questions remain to be answered. The use of new technologies is allowing palaeontologists to glean a wealth of new information from fossils. Traditionally, fossils needed to be painstakingly removed from the encasing rock, a process that can take months or years of work. Today, imaging technologies such as synchrotron x-ray micro-CT scanning allows palaeontologists to literally see through the rock to view the enclosed fossils, and even see the internal structure of the fossils, revealing anatomical details that would be otherwise invisible.

Understanding the geological context of fossils is vital to understanding the meaning of the fossils themselves. Improved dating of fossil-bearing rock formations in Queensland is helping to place them in a global setting. For example, recent redating of Triassic rocks has suggested that they are actually somewhat younger than previously thought. This makes them roughly contemporaneous with the oldest dinosaur fossils from South America, and raises the possibility that some of the world's oldest dinosaurs may one day be found in Queensland.

== Images ==
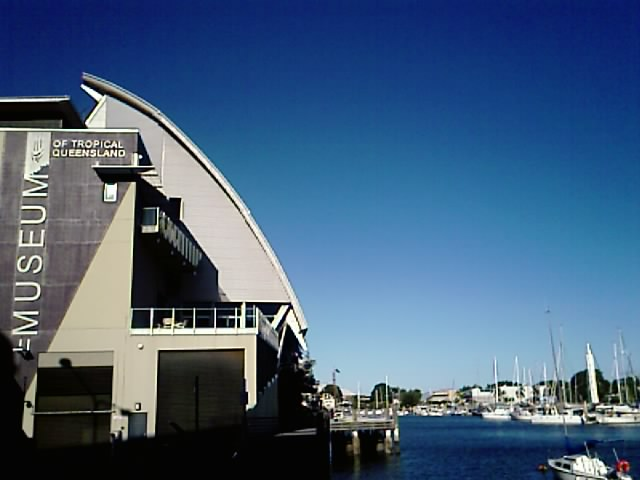
A view of the museum from up the creek

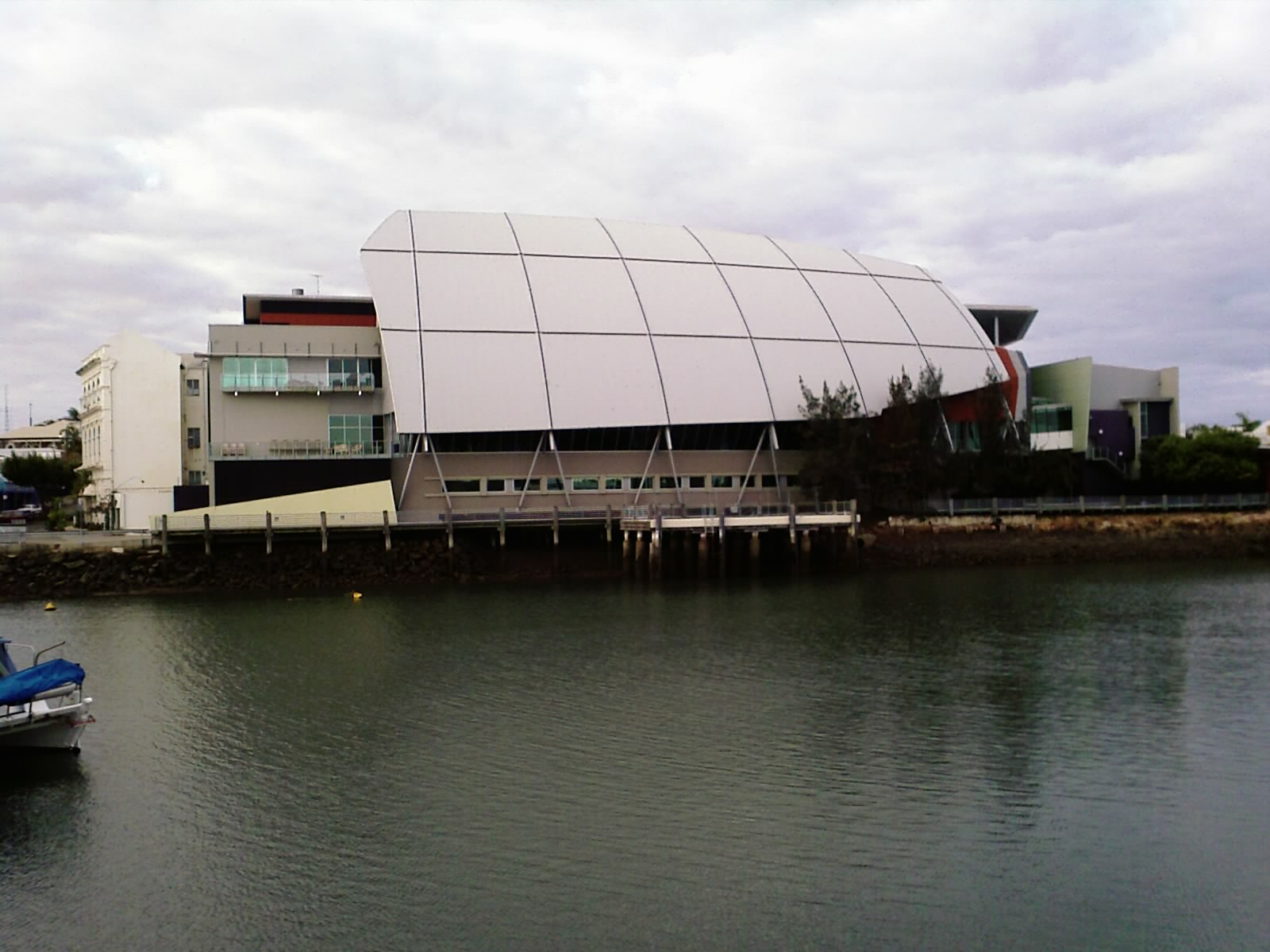
A view of the museum from across Ross Creek
