= James Morrison (mutineer) =

James Morrison (c. 1760–1807) was a British seaman and mutineer who took part in the mutiny on the Bounty.

== Early career ==
James Morrison was a native of Stornoway on the Isle of Lewis in Scotland where his father was a merchant and land entrepreneur. He joined the navy at 18, serving as clerk in the Suffolk, midshipman in the Termagant, and acting gunner in the Hind. In 1783, he passed his master gunner's examination.

== The Bounty ==
James Morrison was the boatswain's mate on board the Bounty. The master gunner's position having been filled two days prior to his application, he may have taken the lesser post because of his eagerness to go along on the 'scientific expedition.'

After the mutiny, Morrison was one of 16 mutineers who returned to Tahiti after the failed attempt to build a colony on Tubuai, while Fletcher Christian and 8 others sailed the Bounty on to Pitcairn Island.

Along with the others who then lived as 'beachcombers' in Tahiti, he was captured here by Captain Edward Edwards of HMS Pandora on 29 March 1791, and brought back to England for court martial.

While on Tahiti, he led an eight-month effort to build a schooner from local timber with which he secretly hoped to get to Batavia in the Dutch East Indies and from there return to England. He kept this to himself until the project was nearing completion, when he took a few others into his confidence. The schooner completed and christened Resolution, they spent many days boiling seawater to get salt sufficient to cure hundreds of pounds of pork for which they in turn had to build casks. They departed from Tahiti the day before the Pandora dropped anchor in Matavai Bay; but in the end the voyage was given up as impracticable owing to their lack of navigation instruments, problems with the schooner's rigging and their inability to carry sufficient water. Captain Edward Edwards confiscated the schooner, ordered her re-rigged with canvas and rope from Pandora's stores and renamed her Matavai. Pandora departed with the mutineers locked up in "Pandora's Box", and the schooner, manned by some of the Pandora's crew, was taken along as a tender. Six weeks later Pandora and Matavai became separated, and after waiting for her for several weeks at a previously agreed rendezvous point off Anamooka, Edwards gave her and her crew up for lost, sailing on. The Pandora was later wrecked on the Great Barrier Reef, and the surviving crew and prisoners, 99 men in all, had to use the ship's boats to continue on. When they reached Samarang, Java, the Matavai and her crew were there. Having arrived in Surabaya five weeks earlier, they were making their way to Batavia (Jakarta) under a military escort, the Dutch governor suspecting them of being pirates from the Bounty. Pleased to see their lost shipmates again, they had a happy reunion. The schooner was eventually sold to a local merchant in Batavia.

== Court-martial ==
At the court-martial judgment, delivered on 18 September 1792, Morrison was sentenced to be hanged. However the court recommended mercy to the King, and, perhaps aided by a letter testifying to his good character from Captain Stirling of the Termagant, he and Peter Heywood were pardoned on 26 October 1792. While incarcerated, Morrison wrote an account describing the Bounty's journey and the island and customs of Tahiti. He was very critical of Bligh's behavior toward his officers. He was even more critical of the officers at the time of the mutiny, writing "The behaviour of the Officers on this Occasion was dastardly beyond description none of them ever making the least attempt to rescue the ship..."

Following his pardon, Morrison returned to naval service. He reached the rank of master gunner, and saw action in the Mediterranean. After serving as a gunnery instructor in Plymouth, he joined Admiral Sir Thomas Troubridge in his flagship HMS Blenheim, in which he had served as a young gunner's mate before his Bounty experience. Blenheim sank sometime in February 1807 in a tropical cyclone off Madagascar with the loss of all on board.

== In popular culture ==
- Morrison's life was the subject of a novel in Scottish Gaelic, Iain F. MacLeòid's Am Bounty (Inverness, 2008).
- His journal was edited by Donald Maxton and published as After the Bounty: A Sailor's Account of the Mutiny, and Life in the South Seas (Potomac Books, 2009).
- In the 1935 film Mutiny on the Bounty, Morrison is portrayed by actor Wallis Clark. Morrison has a somewhat historically inaccurate role in the film, where he is shown as the ship's Boatswain, administering Bligh's harsh discipline, and is then forced to remain onboard after the mutiny due to lack of space in the Bounty launch. In subsequent film adaptions, the Bounty Boatswain is correctly depicted as William Cole.

== Bibliography ==
- Alexander, C. (2004). The Bounty: the true story of the mutiny on the Bounty. New York: Penguin Books. ISBN 9780142004692.
- Grant, J. S. (1997). Morrison of the Bounty: a Scotsman famous but unknown. Stornoway: Acair Ltd. ISBN 9780861521975.
