= David Nelson (botanical collector) =

David Nelson (died 20 July 1789) was gardener-botanist on the third voyage of James Cook, and botanist on HMS Bounty under William Bligh at the time of the famous mutiny.

Nothing is known of his ancestry or early life. In 1776, while working as a gardener at Kew Gardens, he accepted a position as a servant to William Bayly, the official astronomer on HMS Resolution. He was promoted to able seaman; however, his real task as arranged between Joseph Banks and Cook was to collect as many botanical specimens as possible for the Royal Gardens, since Cook had failed to attract an established botanist to the position. He received a small amount of botanical training and instruction from Banks and William Aiton before embarking. During the voyage, he also made a significant collection of native Hawaiian birds, which is now housed in the British Museum.

On returning to London in 1780, he worked as a gardener at Kew Gardens for seven years, before Banks arranged his appointment as botanist to Bligh's voyage to Tahiti to obtain breadfruit trees. Nelson had control of the Great Cabin and 1015 potted breadfruit trees which were intended for the West Indies. He was caught up in the mutiny and, remaining loyal to the captain, was one of the 19 men cast adrift in a small boat. He survived the famous 3800-mile voyage to Timor, but a few days after arriving in Kupang, died of a fever. Bligh would later name Mount Nelson, Tasmania in his honor.

== See also ==
- List of gardener-botanist explorers of the Enlightenment
- European and American voyages of scientific exploration

== Bibliography ==
- Brosse, Jacques (1983). Great Voyages of Exploration. The Golden Age of Discovery in the Pacific. Transl. Stanley Hochman. Sydney: Doubleday. ISBN 0-86824-182-2.
