= HMS Pandora (1779) =

Shipwreck in Queensland, Australia

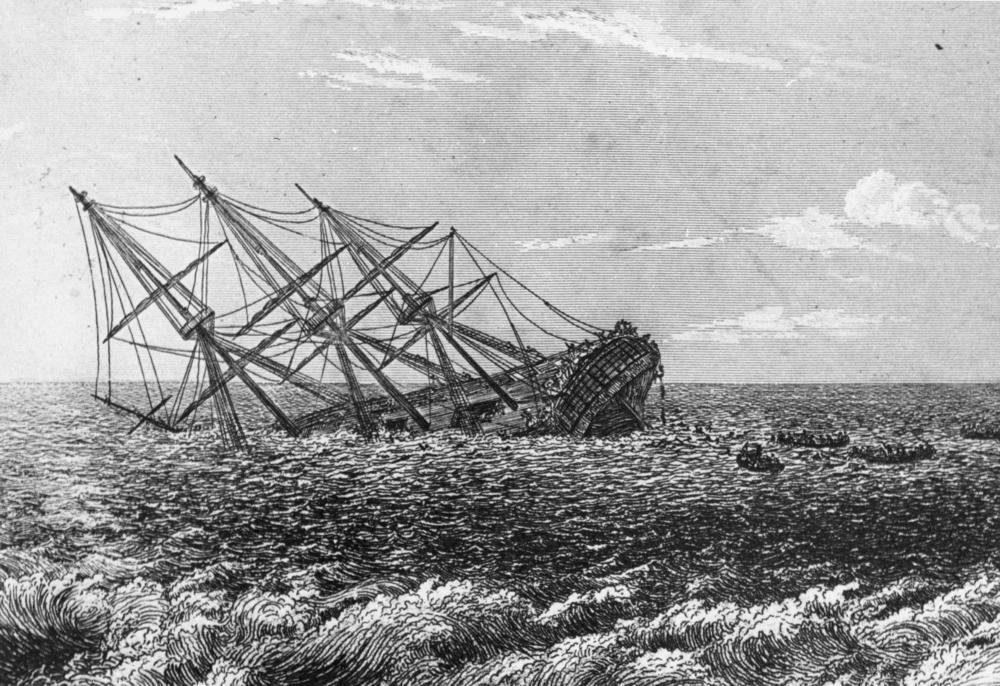
- HMS Pandora foundering on 29 August 1791

History

Great Britain
- Name: HMS Pandora
- Ordered: 11 February 1778
- Builder: Adams & Barnard, Grove Street shipyard, Deptford
- Laid down: 2 March 1778
- Launched: 17 May 1779
- Completed: 3 July 1779 at Deptford Dockyard
- Commissioned: May 1779
- Fate: Wrecked on 28 August 1791 in the Torres Strait.

General characteristics
- Class & type: 24-gun Porcupine-class sixth-rate post ship
- Tons burthen: 524 (bm)
- Length: 114 ft 7 in (34.93 m) (overall); 94 ft 9.5 in (28.893 m) (keel)
- Beam: 32 ft 3 in (9.83 m)
- Draught: 7 ft 4 in (2.24 m); 11 ft (3.4 m)
- Depth of hold: 10 ft 3 in (3.12 m)
- Sail plan: Full-rigged ship
- Complement: 160
- Armament: As built: Upper deck: 22 × 9 pdrs; Quarterdeck: 2 × 6 pdrs

HMS Pandora was a 24-gun Porcupine-class sixth-rate post ship of the Royal Navy launched in May 1779. The vessel is best known for its role in hunting down the Bounty mutineers in 1790, which remains one of the best-known stories in the history of seafaring. Pandora was partially successful by capturing 14 of the mutineers, but wrecked on the Great Barrier Reef on the return voyage in 1791. HMS Pandora is considered to be one of the most significant shipwrecks in the Southern Hemisphere.

== Design and construction ==
Pandora was a 24-gun, 9-pounder, Porcupine-class post ship. The class was designed by Surveyor of the Navy John Williams in 1776; it was an enlarged version of the Sphinx class, also designed by Williams. Ten ships of the class were ordered in total, with the first agreed on 25 June. Pandora was the ninth ship to be ordered, such occurring on 11 February 1778.

Contracted out to Adams & Barnard of Grove Street, Deptford Dockyard, she was laid down on 2 March and launched on 17 May 1779 with the following dimensions: 114 feet 7 inches (34.9 m) along the upper deck and 94 feet 9 1/2 inches (28.9 m) along the keel, with a beam of 32 feet 3 inches (9.8 m) and a depth in the hold of 10 feet 3 inches (3.1 m). The ship measured 52438/94 tons burthen, having cost £5,716 3s. 10d. to build. The fitting out process was completed at Deptford on 3 July, costing a further £5,909 13s. 10d.

Pandora had a crew complement of 160. She was armed with twenty-two 9-pounder long guns on her upper deck, which armament was supplemented with two 6-pounder long guns on the forecastle.

== Early service ==
Pandora's first service was in the Channel during the 1779 threatened invasion by the combined fleets of France and Spain. The ship was deployed in North American waters during the American War Of Independence and saw service as a convoy escort between England and Quebec. On 18 July 1780, while under the command of Captain Anthony Parry, Pandora and Danae captured the American privateer Jack. Then on 2 September, the two British vessels captured the American privateer Terrible. On 14 January Pandora captured the brig Janie. Then on 11 March she captured the ship Mercury. Two days later Pandora and HMS Bellisarius were off the Virginia Capes when they captured the sloop Louis, which had been sailing to Virginia with a cargo of cider and onions. Under Captain John Inglis Pandora captured more merchant vessels. The first was the brig Lively on 24 May 1782. More followed: the ship Mercury and the sloops Port Royal and Superb (22 November 1782), the brig Nestor (3 February 1783), and the ship Financier (29 March). At the end of the American war the Admiralty placed Pandora in ordinary (mothballed) in 1783 at Chatham for seven years.

== Voyage in search of the Bounty ==
Pandora was ordered to be brought back into service on 30 June 1790 when war between Great Britain and Spain seemed likely due to the Nootka Crisis. However, in early August 1790, five months after learning of the mutiny on HMS Bounty, the First Lord of the Admiralty, John Pitt, 2nd Earl of Chatham, decided to despatch the ship to recover the Bounty, capture the mutineers, and return them to England for trial. Pandora was refitted with four 18-pounder carronades and her nine-pounder guns were reduced to twenty in number.

Pandora sailed from the Solent on 7 November 1790, commanded by Captain Edward Edwards and manned by a crew of 134 men. With his crew was Thomas Hayward, who had been on the Bounty at the time of the mutiny, and left with Bligh in the open boat. At Tahiti they were also assisted by John Brown, who had been left on the island by a British merchant ship, The Mercury.

Unknown to Edwards, twelve of the mutineers, together with four crew who had stayed loyal to William Bligh, had by then already elected to return to Tahiti, after a failed attempt to establish a colony (Fort St George) under Fletcher Christian's leadership on Tubuai, one of the Austral Islands. The disaffected men were living in Tahiti as 'beachcombers', many of them having fathered children with local women. Fletcher Christian's group of mutineers and their Polynesian followers had sailed off and eventually established their settlement on the then uncharted Pitcairn Island. By the time of Pandora's arrival, fourteen of the former Bounty men remained on Tahiti, Charles Churchill having been murdered in a quarrel with Matthew Thompson, who was in turn killed by Polynesians, who considered Churchill their king.

Pandora reached Tahiti on 23 March 1791 via Cape Horn. Three men came out and surrendered to Edwards shortly after Pandora's arrival. These were Joseph Coleman, the Bounty's armourer, and midshipmen Peter Heywood and George Stewart. Edwards then dispatched search parties to round up the remainder. Able Seaman Richard Skinner was apprehended the day after Pandora's arrival. By now alerted to Edwards' presence, the other Bounty men fled to the mountains while James Morrison, Charles Norman and Thomas Ellison, tried to reach the Pandora to surrender in the escape boat they had built. All were eventually captured, and brought back to Pandora on 29 March. An eighth man, the half blind Michael Byrne, who had been fiddler aboard Bounty, had also come aboard by this time. It was not recorded whether he had been captured or had handed himself in. Edwards conducted further searches over the next week and a half, and on Saturday two more men were brought aboard Pandora, Henry Hilbrant and Thomas McIntosh. The remaining four men, Thomas Burkett, John Millward, John Sumner and William Muspratt, were brought in the following day. These fourteen men were locked up in a makeshift prison cell, measuring eleven by eighteen feet (3.4 by 5.5 m), on the Pandora's quarterdeck, which they called "Pandora's Box".

On 8 May 1791, Pandora left Tahiti and subsequently spent three months visiting islands in the South-West Pacific in search of the Bounty and the remaining mutineers, without finding any traces of the pirated vessel. During this part of the voyage fourteen crew went missing in two of the ship's boats. Nine of them were on the Matavy, a schooner built by Bounty crew members and called by them Resolution. It had been commandeered to serve as a ship's tender but lost sight of Pandora near Tutuila at night. By chance, during their voyage to Batavia these nine became the first Europeans to make contact with the people of Fiji. At Tubai a Bounty anchor was recovered by Pandora. Apart from a few spars discovered at Palmerston Island, no traces of the fugitive vessel were found. Edwards continued the search until August, when he turned west and headed for the Dutch East Indies. The Pandora sailed near the Pitcairn Islands but did not land; had Edwards checked his charts and found that this uncharted island was at the correct latitude but wrong longitude for Pitcairn Island, he could have fulfilled his mission of taking the nine remaining Bounty mutineers into custody.

In the meantime the Pandora visited Tokelau, Samoa, Tonga and Rotuma. They also passed Vanikoro Island, which Edwards named Pitt's Island; but they did not stop to explore the island and investigate obvious signs of habitation. When passing Vanikoro, Santa Cruz Islands in the Pacific Ocean on 13 August 1791, smoke signals were observed rising from the island. If they had done so, they would very probably have discovered early evidence of the fate of the French Pacific explorer La Perouse's expedition which had disappeared in 1788. However Edwards, who was only interested in prisoners, reasoned that mutineers fearful of discovery would not be advertising their whereabouts, so he ignored the smoke and sailed on. Sven Wahlroos, in his 1989 book, Mutiny and Romance in the South Seas, suggests that the smoke signals were almost certainly a distress message sent by survivors of the Lapérouse expedition, which later evidence indicated were still alive on Vanikoro at that time; three years after the Astrolabe and Boussole had foundered in 1788.

== Wrecked ==
Heading west, making for the Torres Strait, the ship ran aground on 29 August 1791 on the outer Great Barrier Reef. Pandora sank the next morning, claiming the lives of 35 men – 31 crew and 4 of the mutineers. The four prisoners lost were George Stewart; John Sumner; Richard Skinner; and Henry Hillbrandt (according to one history they drowned because their hands were still manacled; James Morrison's hands were also manacled but he survived). According to Morrison account Stewart and Sumner were killed by a gangway; Skinner was out of Pandora's Box but still manacled while Hillbrant was both manacled and trapped in Pandora's Box; in fact if had not been for the action of James Moulter {Boatswain mate} opening up the scuttle hatch all the remaining prisoners [with the exception of three released] and the Armor's Mate Joseph Hodges would have gone down with the ship The remainder of the ship's company (89 crew and 10 prisoners, 7 of whom were released from their cell as the ship sank) assembled on a small treeless sand cay. After two nights on the island they sailed for Timor in four open boats, making a stop on Muralag (Prince of Wales Island) in the Torres Strait seeking fresh water. They arrived in Kupang on 16 September 1791 after an arduous voyage across the Arafura Sea. Sixteen more died after surviving the wreck, many having fallen ill during their sojourn in Batavia. Eventually only 78 of the 134 men who had been on board upon departure returned home.

Captain Edwards and his officers were exonerated for the loss of the Pandora after a court martial. No attempt was made by the colonial authorities in New South Wales to salvage material from the wreck. The ten surviving prisoners were also tried; the various courts martial held acquitted four of those of mutiny and convicted six, of whom three – Millward, Burkitt and Ellison – were executed on 29 October 1792 on board the man-of-war Brunswick at Portsmouth. Peter Heywood and James Morrison received a Royal pardon, while William Muspratt was acquitted on a legal technicality.

Descendants of the nine mutineers not discovered by Pandora still live on Pitcairn Island, the refuge Fletcher Christian founded in January 1790 and where they burnt and scuttled the Bounty a few weeks after arrival. Their hiding place was not discovered until 1808 when the New England sealer Topaz (Captain Mayhew Folger) happened on the tiny uncharted island. By then, all of the mutineers – except John Adams (aka Alexander Smith) – were dead, most having died under violent circumstances.

== Wreck site: discovery and archaeology ==
The wreck of the Pandora is located approximately 5 km north-west of Moulter Cay 11°23′S 143°59′E on the outer Great Barrier Reef, on the edge of the Coral Sea. It is one of the best preserved shipwrecks in Australian waters. Its discovery was made on 15 November 1977 by independent explorers Ben Cropp, Steve Domm and John Heyer.

John Heyer, an Australian documentary film maker, had predicted the position of the wreck based on his research in the National Maritime Museum, Greenwich. His discovery expedition was launched with the help of Steve Domm, a boat owner and naturalist, and the Royal Australian Air Force. Using the built-in sensors of the Royal Australian Air Force P-2V Neptune, the magnetic anomaly caused by the wreck was detected and flares were laid down near the coordinates predicted by Heyer.

Ben Cropp, an Australian television film maker, gained knowledge of Heyer's expedition and decided to launch his own search with the intention of following Heyer by boat; in this way Cropp found the Pandora wreck just before Heyer's boat did. The wreck was actually sighted by a diver called Ron Bell on Cropp's boat. After the wreck site was located it was immediately declared a protected site under the Australian Historic Shipwrecks Act 1976, and in 1978 Cropp and Steve Domm shared the $10,000 reward for finding the wreck.

The Queensland Museum excavated the wreck on nine occasions between 1983 and 1999, according to a research design devised by marine archaeologists at the West Australian and Queensland museums. Archaeologists, historians and scholars at the Museum of Tropical Queensland, Townsville, continue to piece together the Pandora story, using archaeological and extant historical evidence. A large collection of artefacts is on display at the museum.

In the course of the nine seasons of excavation during the 1980s and 1990s, the museum's marine archaeological teams established that approximately 30% of the hull is still intact. The vessel came to rest at a depth of between 30 and 33 metres (98 and 108 ft) on a gently sloping sandy bottom, slightly inclined to starboard; consequently more of the starboard side has been preserved than the port side of the hull. Approximately one third of the seabed in which the wreck is buried has been excavated by the Queensland Museum, leaving approximately 350 m^{3} (12,000 cu ft) for any future excavations.

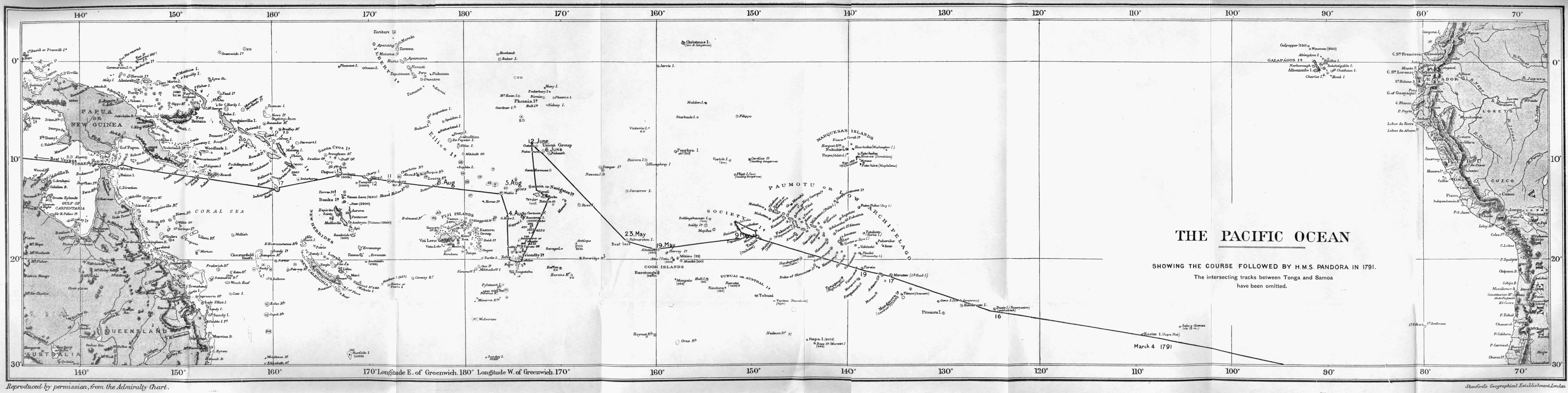
Voyage of HMS Pandora in 1791

== Legacy ==
A pub in Restronguet Creek, Mylor Bridge, Cornwall, that dates to the 13th century was re-named "The Pandora Inn" in honour of HMS Pandora.

An islet in Ducie Atoll, in the Pitcairn Islands, is named after the ship, while another is named after its captain.
