= Harrison Christian =

New Zealand author (born 1990)

Harrison Christian (born 14 December 1990) is a New Zealand journalist and author of nonfiction books. His books include Men Without Country (2021), Should We Fall to Ruin (2022), Terra Nova (2024), and Darwin on the Beagle (2025). Christian's writings often deal with the South Pacific. He is a direct descendant of Fletcher Christian, the leader of the Bounty mutiny.

== Writing career ==
Christian's first book, Men Without Country, tells the story of the 1789 mutiny on the Royal Navy vessel HMS Bounty. The book is critical of historians' attempts to portray the Bounty's commander, Lieutenant William Bligh, in a sympathetic light. It was a bestseller in New Zealand.

His second book, Should We Fall to Ruin, takes an Anzac perspective of the Japanese invasion of Rabaul, New Guinea, in 1942. It received praise from The Sydney Morning Herald and The Saturday Paper.

In June 2024, Christian released his third book, Terra Nova, which recounts Captain Robert Falcon Scott's expedition to the South Pole.

His fourth book, Darwin on the Beagle, was an account of Charles Darwin's voyage around the world as a young naturalist, with a focus on his relationship with the captain of the HMS Beagle, Robert FitzRoy.

== Works ==
Men Without Country: The true story of exploration and rebellion in the South Seas. Ultimo Press. 2021. ISBN 9781761150258.

Should We Fall to Ruin: The untold true story of a remote garrison and their battle against extraordinary odds. Ultimo Press. 2022. ISBN 9781761150067.

Terra Nova: Ambition, jealousy and simmering rivalry in the Heroic Age of Antarctic Exploration. Ultimo Press. 2024. ISBN 9781761152122.

Darwin on the Beagle: The story of the voyage that changed human understanding forever. Ultimo Press. 2025. ISBN 9781761154027.
