= American Cinema Editors Awards 1963 =

13th ACE Awards
- Presented by: American Cinema Editors
- Date: March 23, 1963
- Site: Beverly Wilshire Hotel, Beverly Hills, California
- Hosted by: Carl Reiner

Highlights
- Best Film: The Longest Day

The 13th American Cinema Editors Awards, which were presented on Wednesday, March 23, 1963, at the Beverly Wilshire Hotel, honored the best editors in films and television. The award was hosted by comedian Carl Reiner while the principal speaker was director Mervyn LeRoy.

== Nominees ==
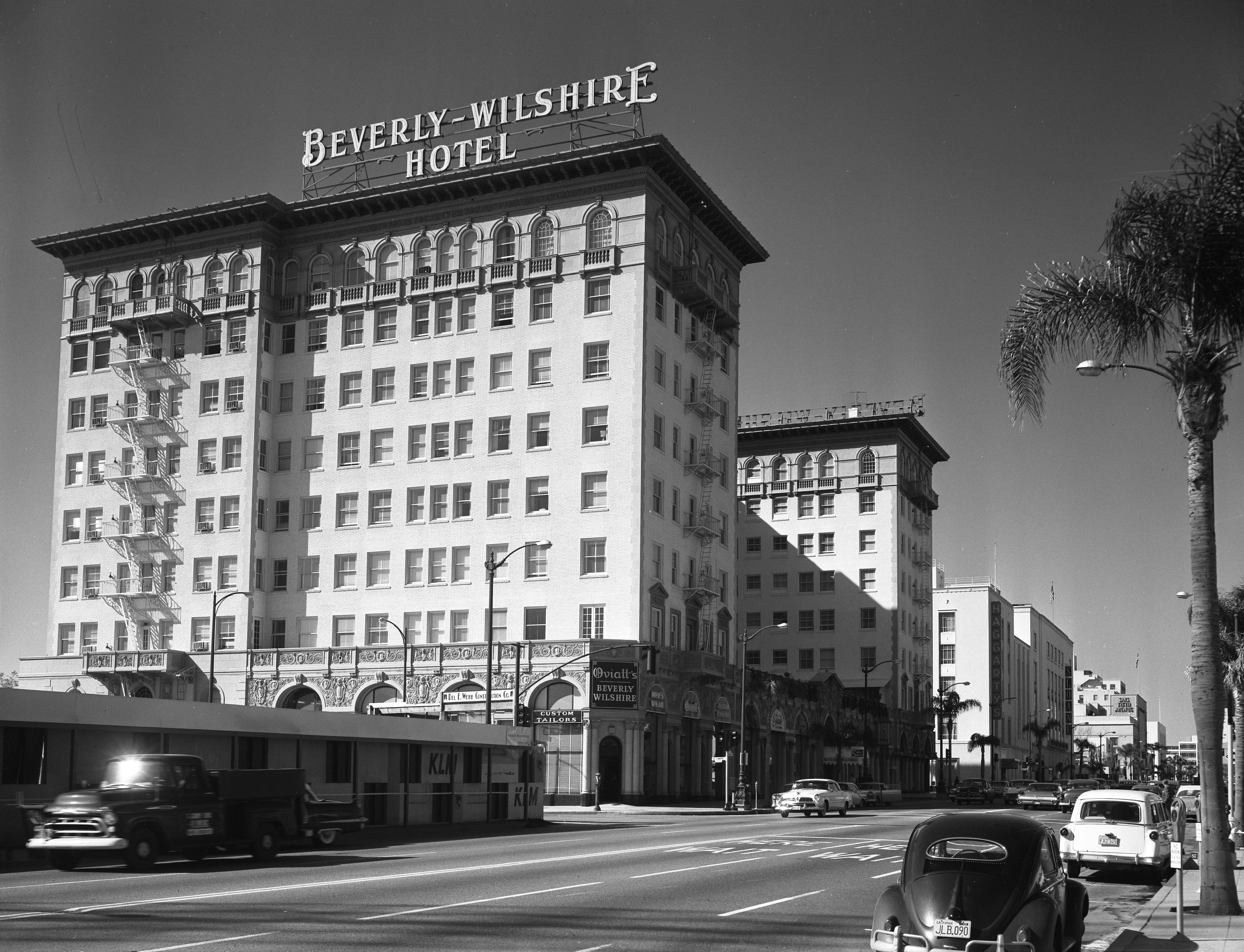
The Beverly Wilshire Hotel in 1959

Best Edited Feature Film	Best Edited Television Program
The Longest Day – Samuel E. Beetley; Lawrence of Arabia – Anne V. Coates; Mutiny on the Bounty – John McSweeney Jr.; To Kill a Mockingbird – Aaron Stell; The Wonderful World of the Brothers Grimm – Walter Thompson	The Dick Powell Show: "The Court Martial of Captain Wycliff" – Desmond Marquette; Combat!: "Escape to Nowhere" – William Mace; The Eleventh Hour: "Of Roses and Nightingales and Other Lovely Things" – Joseph Dervin; It's a Man's World: "The Beavers and the Otters" – Danford B. Greene; McHale's Navy: "A Purple Heart for Gruber" – Sam E. Waxman
Best Edited Special (Documentary)
The Cadillac – Robert Ford and Russell D. Tinsley; Voyage of Mr. Q – Donald Wolfe
