= Resort hotel =

Type of hotel

A resort hotel is a hotel which often contains full-sized resort facilities with full-service accommodations and luxury amenities. These hotels may attract both business conferences and vacationing tourists and offer more than a convenient place to stay. These hotels may be referred to as major conference center hotels, flagship hotels, destination hotels, and destination resorts.

These hotels as destinations may be characterized by distinctive architecture, upscale lodgings, ballrooms, large conference facilities, restaurants, and recreation activities such as golf or skiing. They may be located in a variety of settings from major cities to remote locations.

== History ==
Since the 1800s, the traditional concept full-service conference and resort hotels have been based upon a venue which is typically remote and has a natural feature as its attraction. For example, the Kviknes Hotel in Norway was a difficult to reach remote location which provides visitors access to the scenic Sognefjord at Balestrand or The Brando Resort on Tetiaroa which is only accessible by a private plane from Tahiti. Historically there were certain built-in amenities such as gourmet cuisine, music recitals, and shoreline trails; however, the amenities of modern (post-1980) destination hotels dwarf the scale of these earlier models. Many of the Las Vegas and Caribbean resort hotels have complete shopping malls, conference centers and large entertainment halls on site; thus, the contemporary version of a destination often features large on-site capital investment in activities, although the access to a local natural feature is still retained by many newer destination hotels.

A mega-resort is a type of destination which is of an exceptionally large size, sometimes featuring large-scale attractions (casino, golf course, theme park, multiple accommodations). The hotels along the Las Vegas Strip are most typically thought of as mega-resorts owing to their immense size and complexity. Kirk Kerkorian is credited for building the first mega-resort in 1969 earning him the nickname "father of the mega-resort".

Two projects in Las Vegas in 1969 and 1973 by architect Martin Stern, Jr. and entrepreneur Kirk Kerkorian, the International Hotel and the MGM Grand, set the standard for such casino resorts. The Mirage gave its size and emphasis on non-gaming entertainment options like shopping and fine dining to draw in customers. Mega-resorts use the same fantastic or mythical theme (medieval life at Excalibur, tropical at The Mirage, famous cities, etc.) throughout their properties.

Many mega-resorts have a large theme park as its centerpiece. Resorts such as the Walt Disney Parks and Resorts feature multiple hotels, multiple theme parks, a shopping complex, and other features. Other mega-resorts exist with no specific centerpiece, having many features that are considered prominent, such as Atlantis Paradise Island and its upcoming sister park in Dubai.

== Gallery ==
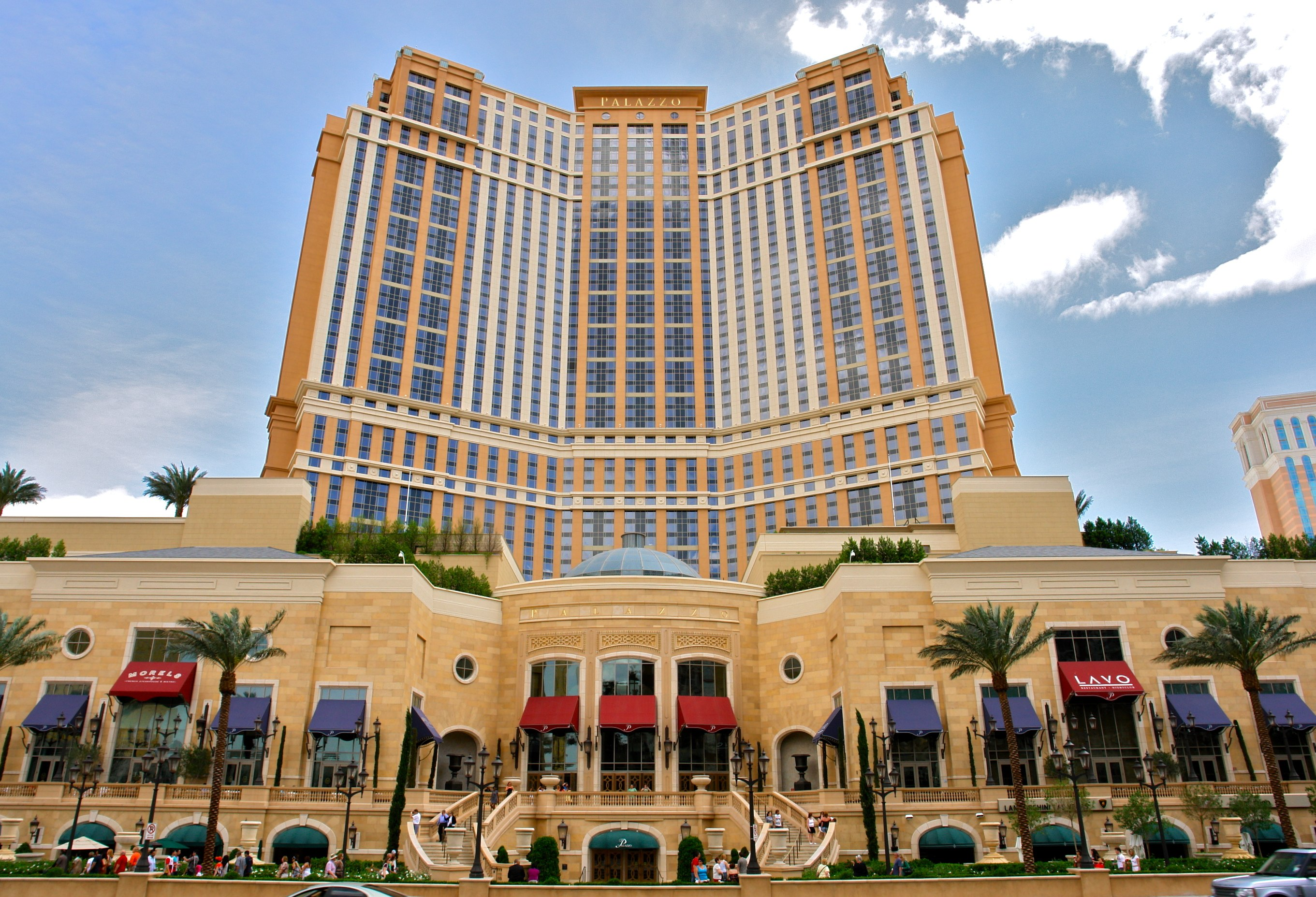
The Palazzo is a casino resort hotel located on the Las Vegas Strip

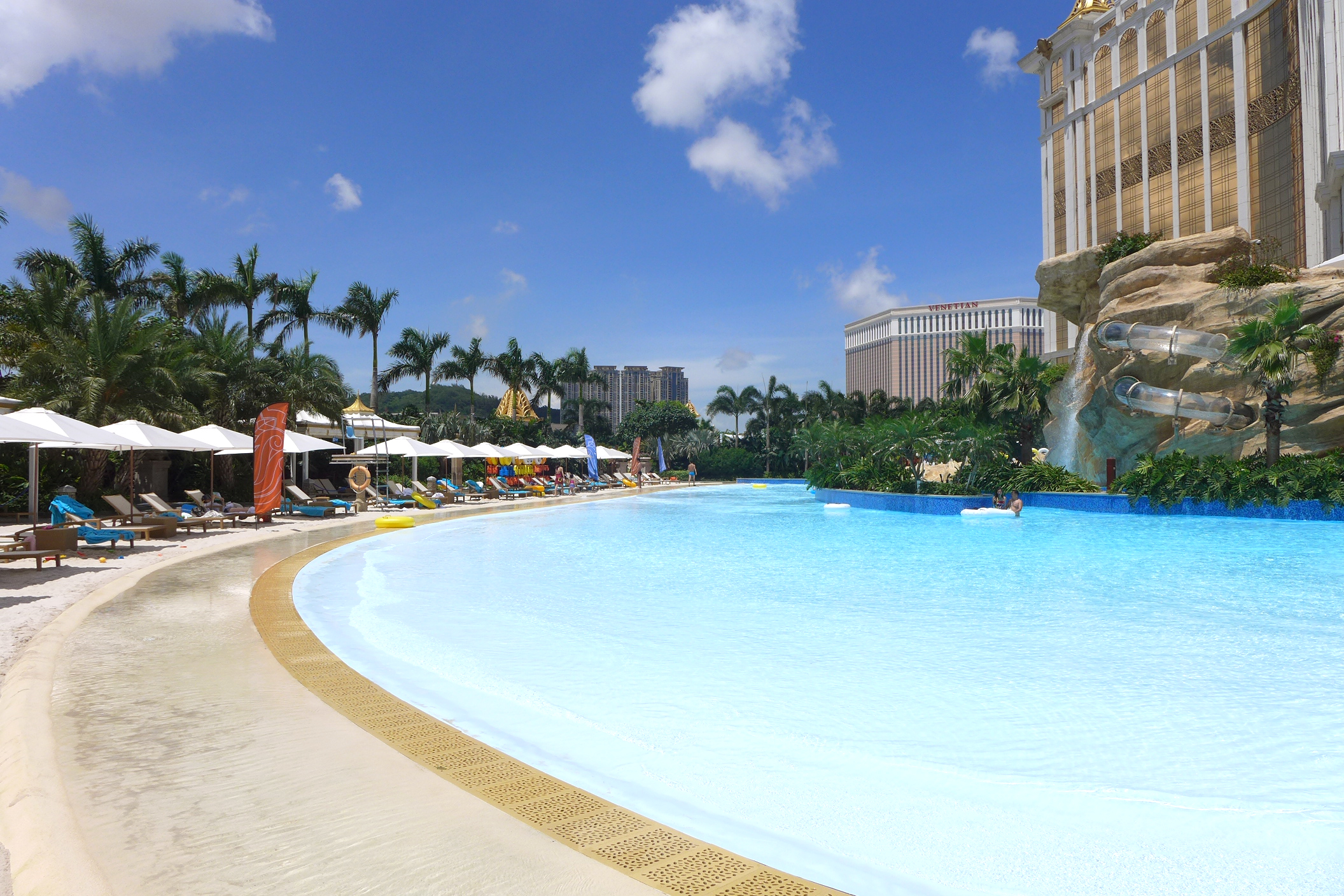
Galaxy Macau consists of eight different luxury resort hotels

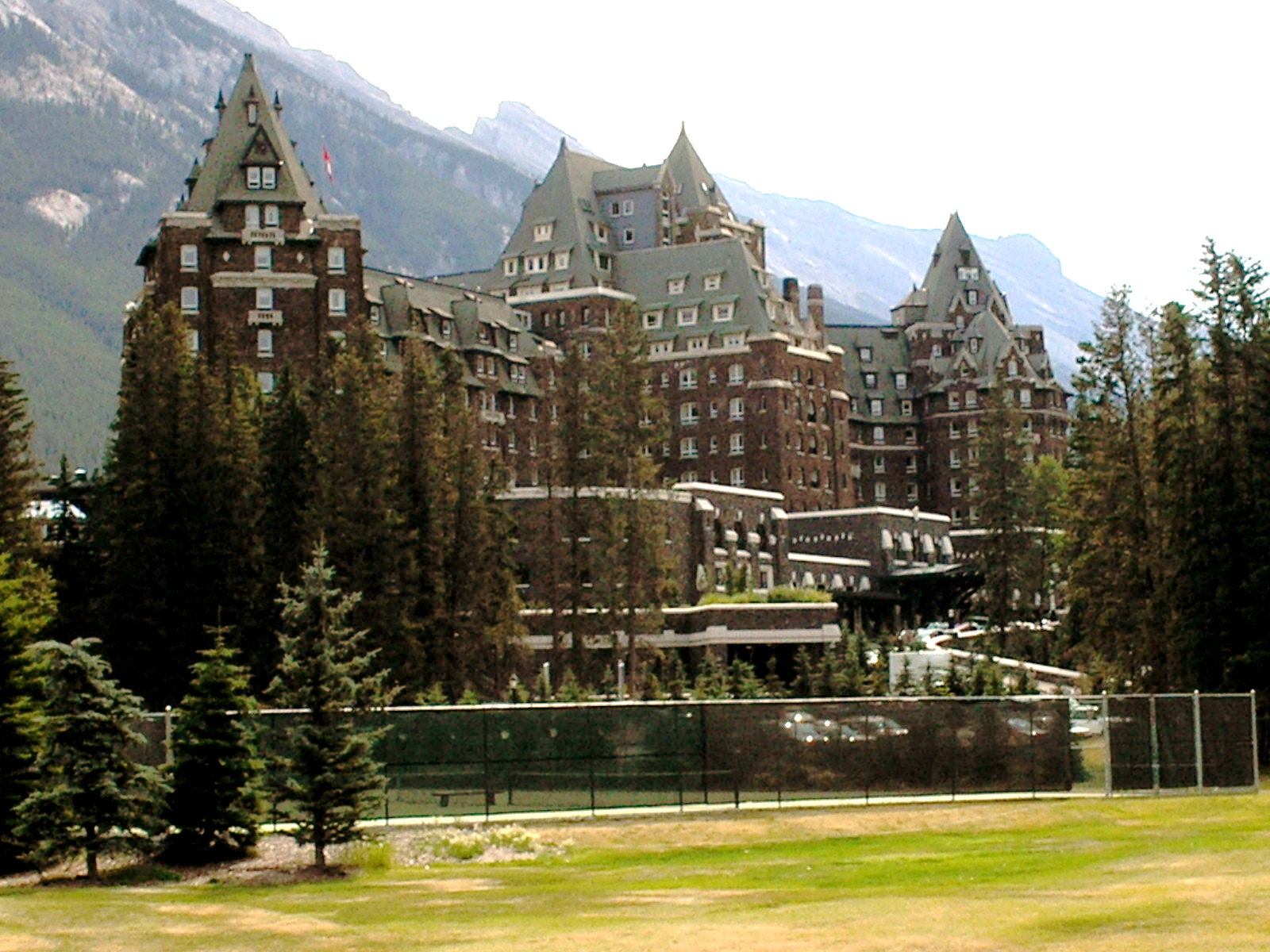
Banff Springs Hotel in Banff National Park

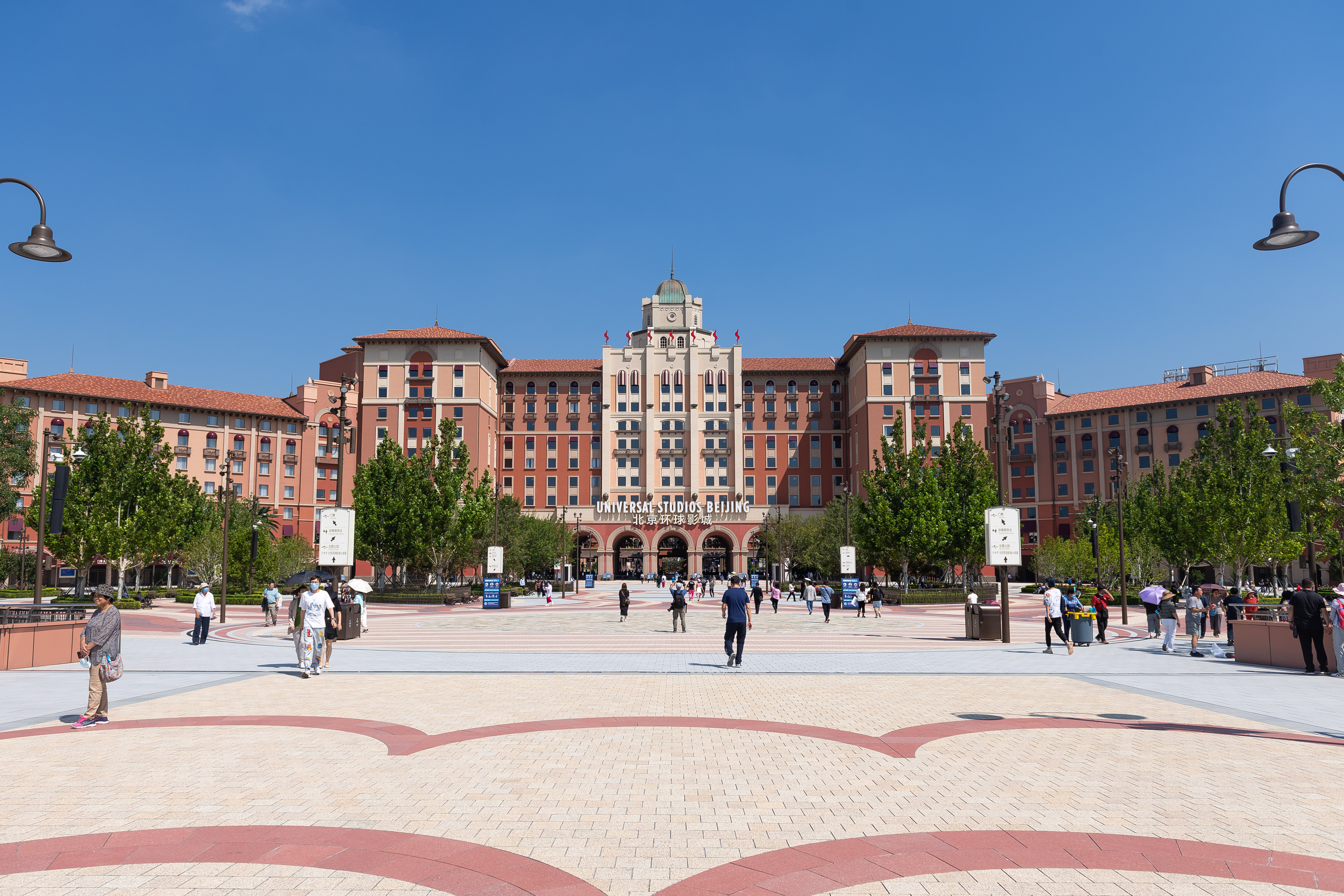
Universal Beijing Resort

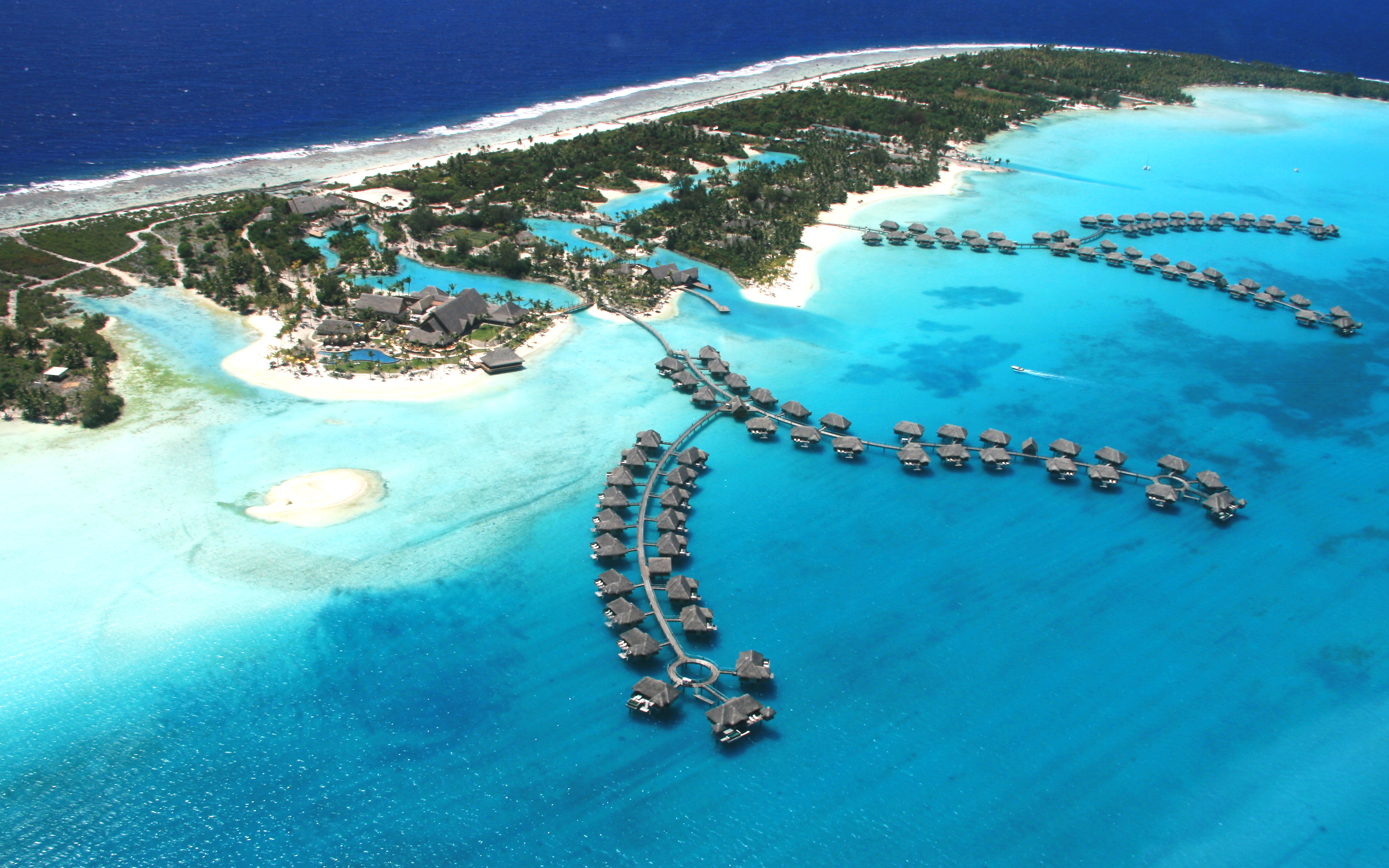
Four Seasons Resort Bora Bora

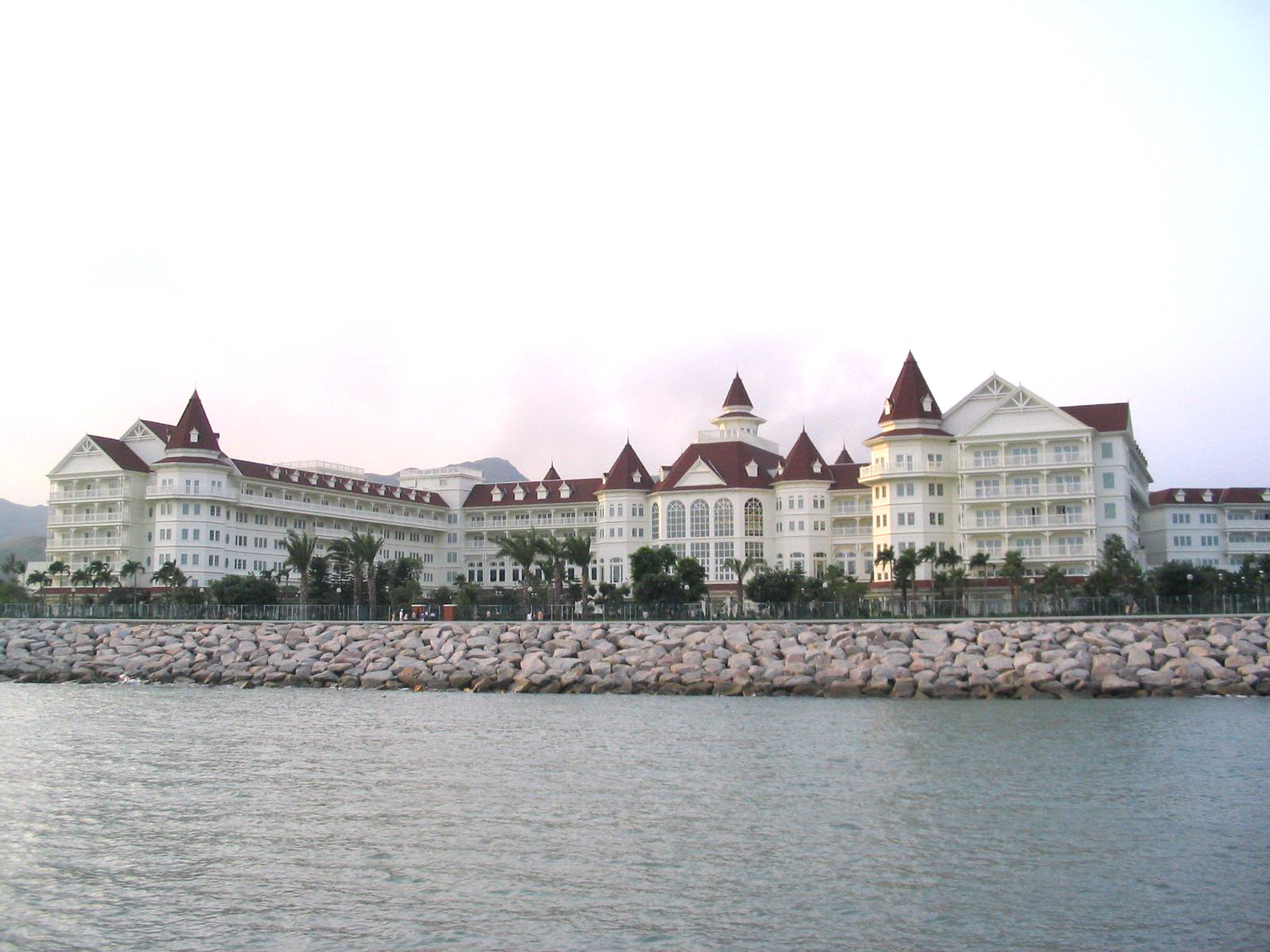
Hong Kong Disneyland Hotel

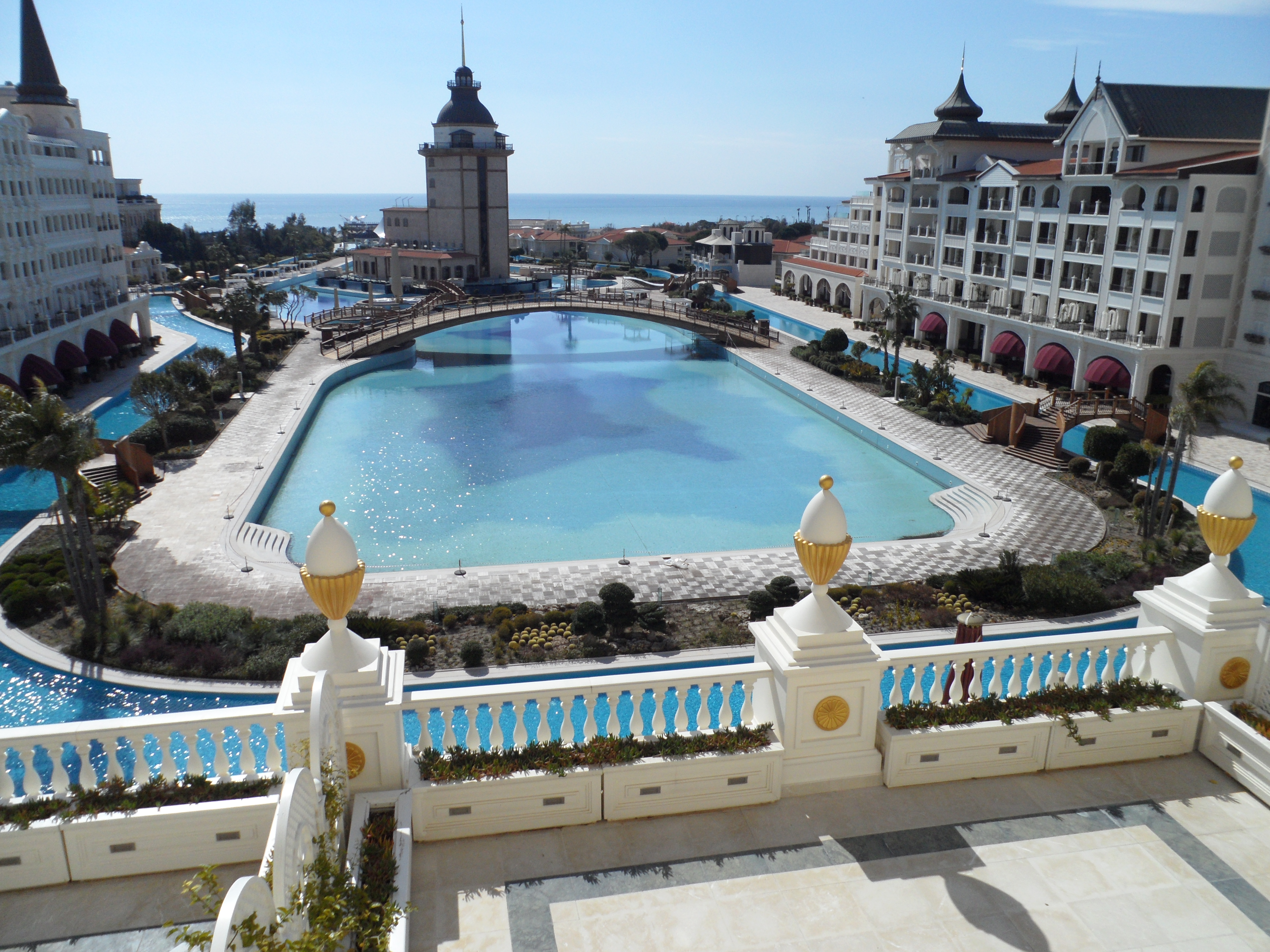
Mardan Palace in Antalya, Turkey

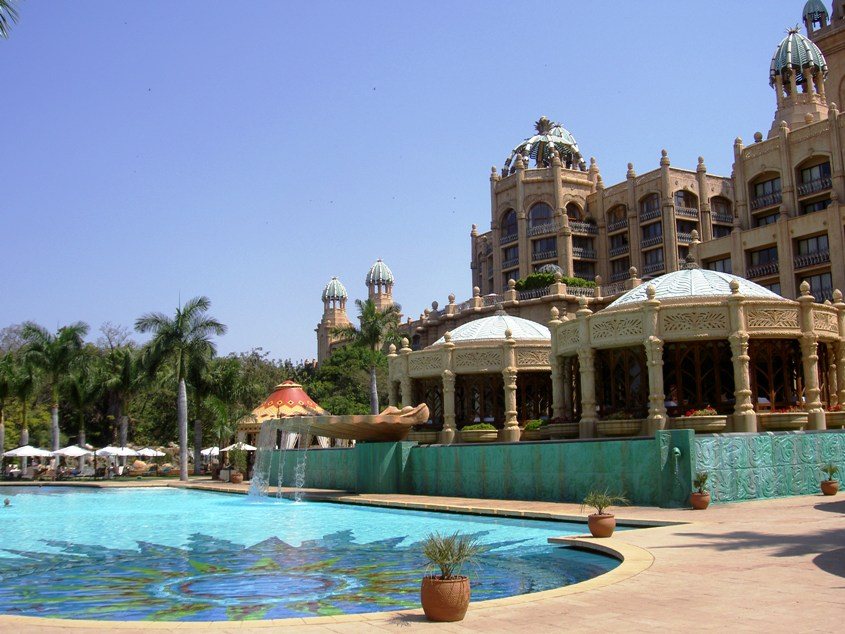
Sun City in North West Province, South Africa

== See also ==
- Casino hotel
