= Rixos President Astana =

Hotel in Kazakhstan

Coordinates: 51°8′1.7″N 71°25′16.6″E

Rixos President Astana is a luxury (5-star) hotel, which is part of the international Rixos Hotels chain founded by Fettah Tamince Rixos President Astana constructed in 2005 in Astana by The Sembol İnşaat Construction Company The first president of the Republic of Kazakhstan - Nursultan Nazarbayev visited opening ceremony Rixos President Astana was constructed in 9 months and is the first 5 star hotel in the Republic of Kazakhstan.

== History ==
Rixos President Astana supported organization of “Kazakhstan through the Eyes of the Foreign Media" Organized by Kazakhstan's Chief Editors Club In addition to that, in the Rixos Resident Astana with the official support of the Ministry of Oil and Gas of the Republic of Kazakhstan held the Third Annual Conference "Kazneftegazservis - 2014" The International Event was held in Astana, Rixos President Astana Hotel, called “Workshop on legislation related to cybercrime and electronic evidence”. About 30 participants from Kazakhstan, Belarus, Estonia and Hungary took participation on the workshop. Furthermore, all of the meetings of the Astana Process on Syria was on 14–15 September 2017 in Rixos president Astana The Second Islamic finance forum held in the Kazakh capital at Rixos President Astana hotel on 20 September 2011 Finally, most of the OSCE forums held in Rixos President Astana

== Awards ==
- LuxuryTravelGuide – Global award 2015
- Kazakhstan’s Leading Hotel 2017
- 2017, 2019 Traveller’s choice by Tripadvisor
- Certificate of excellence 2019 by Tripadvisor
