= List of lighthouses in French Polynesia =

This is a list of lighthouses in French Polynesia.

== Lighthouses ==
Name	Image	Year built	Location & coordinates	Class of light	Focal height	NGA number	Admiralty number	Range nml
Fara Ute Range Front Lighthouse	Image	N/A	Papeete; 17°32′26.6″S 149°34′20.9″W	Fl R 3s.	16 metres (52 ft)	2889	K4963	5
Fara Ute Range Rear Lighthouse	Image	N/A	Papeete; 17°32′26.3″S 149°34′16.1″W	Fl R 3s.	20 metres (66 ft)	2890	K4963.1	5
Fort Collet Lighthouse	Image	N/A	Nuku Hiva; 8°54′55.2″S 140°05′42.9″W	Iso R 2s.	34 metres (112 ft)	2856	K5052	6
Île Aukena Range Front Lighthouse		N/A	Aukena; 23°08′24.8″S 134°54′58.5″W	Iso G 4s.	6 metres (20 ft)	2799.7	K5006.4	6
Île Aukena Range Rear Lighthouse		N/A	Aukena; 23°08′23.0″S 134°54′26.3″W	Iso G 4s.	18 metres (59 ft)	2799.71	K5006.41	6
Île Reiono Lighthouse		N/A	Teti'aroa; 17°02′59.2″S 149°32′43.2″W	Fl (2) W 10s.	15 metres (49 ft)	3006	K4967.5	15
Mota Maherehonae Lighthouse		N/A	Rangiroa; 14°55′09.2″S 147°51′04.9″W	Fl W 5s.	30 metres (98 ft)	2818	K4988	20
Passe Tareu Range Front Lighthouse		N/A	Opunohu Bay; 17°30′29.1″S 149°51′08.9″W	Fl R 4s.	5 metres (16 ft)	3024.2	K4968.91	6
Passe Tareu Range Rear Lighthouse		N/A	Opunohu Bay; 17°30′35.0″S 149°51′06.2″W	Fl R 4s.	12 metres (39 ft)	3024.4	K4968.92	6
Passe de Teavanui Range Front Lighthouse		N/A	Bora Bora; 16°30′08.9″S 151°45′11.6″W	Iso R 4s.	8 metres (26 ft)	2984.2	K4982.6	5
Passe de Teavanui Range Rear Lighthouse		N/A	Bora Bora; 16°30′11.5″S 151°45′05.2″W	Iso R 4s.	16 metres (52 ft)	2984.4	K4982.61	5
Passe Tiputa Range Front Lighthouse		N/A	Rangiroa; 14°58′37.1″S 147°37′58.6″W	Iso G 4s.	10 metres (33 ft)	2820	K4993	5
Passe Tiputa Range Rear Lighthouse	Image	N/A	Rangiroa; 14°58′40.6″S 147°38′01.3″W	Iso G 4s.	14 metres (46 ft)	2824	K4993.1	5
Pointe Aroa Lighthouse		N/A	Mo'orea; 17°28′24.0″S 149°46′30.4″W	Fl (4) W 20s.	23 metres (75 ft)	3008	K4968.2	18
Pointe Kureru Range Front Lighthouse		N/A	Mangareva; 25°06′03.4″S 134°57′14.3″W	Fl G 4s.	6 metres (20 ft)	2799.91	K5006.71	6
Pointe Kureru Range Rear Lighthouse		N/A	Mangareva; 25°05′53.8″S 134°57′02.7″W	Fl G 4s.	11 metres (36 ft)	2799.9	K5006.7	6
Pointe Paroa Lighthouse	Image	N/A	Mo'orea; 17°36′16.6″S 149°48′58.7″W	Fl (3) 15s:	13 metres (43 ft)	3025	K4968.4	18
Pointe Tepari Range Rear Lighthouse		N/A	Taha'a; 16°38′47.9″S 151°32′04.7″W	Iso R 4s.	20 metres (66 ft)	2980.01	K4973.02	N/A
Pointe Teturiroa Lighthouse	Image	N/A	Bora Bora; 16°32′47.2″S 151°47′22.9″W	Fl W 5s.	13 metres (43 ft)	2982	K4982	15
Pointe Vénus Lighthouse		1868	Mahina; 17°29′42.0″S 149°29′39.7″W	Fl W 5s.	31 metres (102 ft)	2860	K4952	27
Pouheva Lighthouse		1936	Makemo; 16°37′13.8″S 143°34′07.0″W	Fl W 5s.	25 metres (82 ft)	2816	K5004	18
Tetiaroa Lighthouse		N/A	Tetiaroa; 17°02′59.2″S 149°32′43.2″W	Fl (2) W 10s.	15 metres (49 ft)	3006	K4967.5	15
Tipaerui Range Front Lighthouse		N/A	Papeete; 17°32′38.2″S 149°34′48.1″W	Oc (2) G 8s.	23 metres (75 ft)	2884	K4956	8
Tipaerui Range Rear Lighthouse		N/A	Papeete; 17°32′45.2″S 149°34′43.6″W	Oc (2) G 8s.	34 metres (112 ft)	2888	K4956.1	8
Torea Lighthouse	Image	N/A	Fakarava; 16°04′09.6″S 145°41′48.0″W	Fl W 5s.	30 metres (98 ft)	2816-8	K5000.4	19
Tupatapi Lighthouse		N/A	Hikueru; 17°32′34.2″S 142°40′13.7″W	Fl W 5s.	18 metres (59 ft)	2812.5	K5004.86	18
Vai'are Range Front Lighthouse		N/A	Mo'orea; 17°31′26.0″S 149°46′25.8″W	Iso R 4s.	8 metres (26 ft)	3020	K4968.3	7
Vai'are Range Rear Lighthouse	Image	N/A	Mo'orea; 17°31′22.9″S 149°46′34.4″W	Iso R 4s.	14 metres (46 ft)	3021	K4968.31	7

== See also ==
- Lists of lighthouses and lightvessels
