= Christian Brando =

American actor and felon (1958–2008)

- Born: Christian Devi Brando; May 11, 1958; Los Angeles, California, U.S.
- Died: January 26, 2008 (aged 49); Los Angeles, California, U.S.
- Resting place: Kalama Oddfellows Cemetery, Kalama, Washington, U.S.
- Years active: 1968–2008
- Spouses: Mary McKenna (m. 1981; div. 1987); Deborah Presley (m. 2004; ann. 2004)
- Partner: Donna Lopez Geon (2004–2008)
- Parents: Marlon Brando (father); Anna Kashfi (mother)
- Family: Cheyenne Brando (half-sister)

Christian Devi Brando (May 11, 1958 – January 26, 2008) was one of the eleven acknowledged children of actor Marlon Brando, and the only one Brando had with his first wife, former actress Anna Kashfi.

During the 1990s and early 2000s, Brando was involved in a highly publicized legal case and several personal disputes that received media attention.

== Early life ==
Christian Brando was named after his father's longtime friend French film director Christian Marquand who later directed Marlon in the 1968 film Candy. Christian was born in Los Angeles on May 11, 1958, the product of an affair between Marlon Brando and Anna Kashfi, an actress born to a British family in colonial India. Marlon and Kashfi met in 1955, and Kashfi became pregnant in 1957. They married in 1958 and divorced one year later.

Christian was shuttled between his mother and father. His parents became increasingly hostile and abusive toward each other, and engaged in a protracted custody battle. The 12-year custody battle and his mother's uncontrollable temper due to her abuse of drugs and alcohol significantly affected young Christian. Marlon eventually won custody of Christian, who was then 13 years old. At that time, Marlon had described his son as a "basket case of emotional disorder".

Marlon was a distant father and spent little time with young Christian, who was raised by nannies and servants. Christian moved between Hollywood and Tetiʻaroa, his father's private island near Tahiti. Marlon continued to have relationships with multiple women by whom he fathered numerous children. Years later, while commenting on his childhood, Christian said, "The family kept changing shape, I'd sit down at the breakfast table and say, 'Who are you?'"

In 1972, while his father was abroad in France filming Last Tango in Paris, Christian was kidnapped by his mother, who took him from school, then brought him to a gang of hippie friends in Baja California, Mexico. Apparently, she had promised them $10,000 if they would hide Christian away. When she refused to pay, they took and hid the boy; a posse of private detectives hired by Marlon, from an agency named "The Investigators", led by private investigator Jay J. Armes, rescued him late one night. He was found living in a tent and ill with bronchial pneumonia. His mother was arrested near the Mexican border after being pulled over for drunk driving and disorderly behavior. Back in court, his father was awarded sole custody.

During his teen years, he dropped out of high school and began drinking and using LSD. He was not interested in being in the spotlight. He ran away from home to Washington state to move in with family friends, which his father ultimately approved and supported. His father visited him there and later purchased a remote cabin where Christian practised artistic welding at age 22, dividing his time between the cabin and his father's Hollywood Hills residence.

=== Acting ===
Christian Brando's only credited acting role was in the Italian production La Posta in Gioco ("The Prize at Stake", 1988) directed by Sergio Nasca.

== Killing of Dag Drollet ==
On May 16, 1990, Brando fatally shot Dag Drollet, the boyfriend of his half-sister Cheyenne, in the living room of Brando's father's house in Beverly Hills, California. Drollet (the son of French Polynesian politician Jacques Drollet) was in a four-year relationship with Cheyenne, who was eight months pregnant by Drollet at the time.

A few days before the incident, Drollet had flown in from Tahiti to Los Angeles to visit Cheyenne. Cheyenne was visiting her father along with her mother, and both were staying at Marlon Brando's residence. Marlon Brando had known the Drollet family for years; however, Christian Brando met Dag Drollet for the first time several hours before the shooting.

On the evening of the killing, Brando and Cheyenne had dinner at Musso & Frank Grill, where Cheyenne told Brando that Drollet had been physically abusive toward her. Christian Brando said to a reporter from the Los Angeles Times, "She went off on this bizarre tangent."

Later, around 11 p.m. that night, Brando, who admitted to being drunk at the time, confronted Drollet at the Brando residence and shot him. Brando claimed that he did not intend to kill Drollet. "I just wanted to scare him," he said. Cheyenne was staying in a separate room. Christian Brando claimed that he and Drollet were fighting over the gun when it accidentally went off. In an interview with The Times, Brando said that later revelations about Cheyenne's mental health had made him question whether she was ever beaten by Drollet. "I feel like a complete chump for believing her," he said.

=== Trial and aftermath ===
Robert Shapiro was one of Christian Brando's lawyers. Brando was initially charged with murder; however, prosecutors were unable to proceed with a murder charge because of the absence of Cheyenne, who was a crucial witness to their case. Marlon Brando had Cheyenne admitted into a psychiatric hospital in Tahiti. After several attempts to get her to return to California, a judge eventually quashed all efforts by the prosecution. Without Cheyenne's testimony, prosecutors felt they could no longer prove that Drollet's death was premeditated; therefore, Christian was not charged with first-degree murder and was presented with a plea deal. When his father pleaded for a reduced sentence for his son, he took the stand in the Santa Monica courthouse and said, "I think that perhaps I failed as a father." After heavily publicized pre-trial proceedings, Brando pleaded guilty to manslaughter and spent five years in prison.

Cheyenne attempted suicide twice during the trial. Then, in 1995, a year before Christian was released from prison, she died by suicide by hanging herself at her mother's house in Tahiti at age 25 after losing custody of her son.

Conditional on his release, Brando was accepted and enrolled in the state community college system in southern New Hampshire. After a year in the program, he moved to Washington state for a few years while working as a tree cutter and artistic welder.

== Personal life ==
=== Relationship with Bonny Lee Bakley ===
Robert Blake and his defense attorneys claimed that Brando was involved in the 2001 murder of Blake's 44-year-old wife Bonny Lee Bakley. Blake was ultimately charged with Bakley's murder, and although acquitted in the criminal trial, Blake was found liable for her death in a civil wrongful-death case.

Testimony introduced during the criminal pre-trial hearings and the subsequent civil trial attempted to implicate Brando in the murder, suggesting that he had the same motive as Blake to have Bakley killed. Bakley had become pregnant and claimed to both Brando and Blake that they were the father. A DNA test subsequently determined that Blake, not Brando, was the biological father.

According to trial testimony, days before her death, Bakley continued to claim Brando was the father of her child.

During the 2004 murder trial of Robert Blake, defense attorneys attempted to introduce testimony from Dianne Mattson, who claimed she overheard Christian Brando in a 2001 conversation suggesting Bonny Lee Bakley should be shot. The prosecution filed a motion opposing this evidence, and Deputy District Attorney Greg Dohi stated that Mattson had not mentioned Brando's involvement in any plot during police interviews. During pre‑trial motions in the Robert Blake case, prosecutors opposed a defence bid to take sworn testimony from a woman who they alleged might implicate Christian Brando in a plot related to the killing of Blake's wife, Bonny Lee Bakley.

Superior Court Judge Darlene Schempp ruled that Mattson's proposed testimony was irrelevant and constituted inadmissible hearsay, and she declined to allow it at trial. Brando also stated that he had ended any romantic relationship with Mattson prior to these events. Mattson later filed an anti‑harassment order against JoAn Corrales, Brando's caregiver, which Corrales denied. The court's rulings clarified that Mattson's allegations were not legally accepted and that there was no admitted evidence linking Christian Brando to the killing of Bakley.

In a tape-recorded conversation between Brando and Bakley, Brando stated, "You're lucky. You know, I mean, not on my behalf, but you're lucky someone ain't out there to put a bullet in your head."

According to pre-trial testimony and corroboration, Brando was in Washington state on the night of Bakley's death. Other pre-trial testimony alleged that associates of Brando were involved in the murder. One of those allegedly involved was prosecution witness Duffy Hambleton, a stunt man. Hambleton claimed that Blake tried to hire him to kill Bakley. Hambleton claimed he refused the offer. Blake, however, testified that he hired Hambleton for personal security to protect himself and Bakley from a stalker. Criminal pre-trial and civil trial testimony claimed that Hambleton was an associate of Brando and that Hambleton arranged Bakley's murder to curry favor with Brando. The judge in the criminal case prevented the defense from presenting that argument during trial.

Brando was called as a witness in Blake's civil trial but refused to testify, invoking his Fifth Amendment constitutional rights. Brando's behavior in court resulted in a contempt of court charge and conviction.

=== Marriage and alleged spousal abuse ===
Brando's first marriage to make-up artist Mary McKenna ended without acrimony in 1987 after six years; they first met when both were ten years old. On October 16, 2004, in Las Vegas, intoxicated, Brando wed Deborah Presley, the alleged illegitimate daughter of Elvis Presley. After just two weeks, he annulled the marriage. According to his legal team, in a case he later filed against her, she broke into his house and attacked him after he ended the Las Vegas sham marriage and left her. He was placed on probation and ordered to attend drug and alcohol rehabilitation. In December 2005, Presley filed a lawsuit against Brando in Los Angeles County Superior Court, alleging spousal abuse during a dispute. In 2007 and after Christian's death in 2008, Deborah's attempts to claim from Marlon Brando's estate failed, and in 2009, the appeals court ruled she had no legal standing and had also filed too late—leaving her with nothing.

== Death and burial dispute ==
Brando died of pneumonia on January 26, 2008, at Hollywood Presbyterian Medical Center at 49. He had been admitted into Hollywood Presbyterian Medical Center on January 11. Brando was buried on February 17, at the Kalama Oddfellows Cemetery in Kalama, Washington. Afterward, a legal dispute arose between his mother, Anna Kashfi, and his partner Donna Lopez Geon, with whom he had lived for approximately four years prior to his death. The dispute concerned Christian Brando's estate and personal property, including a portion of the ashes of his father, actor Marlon Brando, which had been divided among close family members following Marlon Brando's death in 2004. Kashfi initiated legal action in Los Angeles courts, seeking control over Christian's estate and the return of certain items, while Lopez contested these claims. The prolonged legal proceedings were ultimately resolved through a settlement in 2010.
