= Cheyenne Brando =

Tahitian model (1970–1995)

- Brando in 1993
- Born: Tarita Cheyenne Brando; February 20, 1970; Papeete, Tahiti, French Polynesia
- Died: April 16, 1995 (aged 25); Puna'auia, Tahiti, French Polynesia
- Cause of death: Suicide by hanging
- Burial place: Roman Catholic Urania Cemetery, Papeete, Windward Islands, French Polynesia
- Occupation: Model
- Years active: 1986–1990
- Known for: Daughter of renowned actor Marlon Brando
- Partner: Dag Drollet (1987–1990; his death)
- Children: 1
- Parents: Marlon Brando; Tarita Teriipaia
- Relatives: Christian Brando (half-brother)

Tarita Cheyenne Brando (February 20, 1970 – April 16, 1995) was a Tahitian fashion model. She was the daughter of actor Marlon Brando and Tarita Teriipaia, an actress from French Polynesia whom he met while filming Mutiny on the Bounty in 1962.

== Early life ==
Brando was born in 1970. She was raised by her mother Tarita on the island of Tahiti, south of Papeete. Her parents romantically separated in 1972.

While growing up, Cheyenne occasionally visited her father in the United States with her mother and her brother Teihotu. In 1976 Brando stated, "I don't think I will let them [Cheyenne and Teihotu] go to the States. As Tahitians, they are too trusting. They would be destroyed in the pace of life in the States." He did not want them to be bombarded or harassed by cameras and attention; a major reason he loved Tahiti was because it gave him and his family a sense of privacy. As a child, Cheyenne reportedly adored her father and boasted about him. As she entered her teenage years, her feelings towards her father changed. In a 1990 interview, she stated, "I have come to despise my father for the way he ignored me when I was a child. He came to the island maybe once a year but really didn't seem to care whether he saw me or not. He wanted us but he didn't want us."

Cheyenne eventually dropped out of high school and began taking drugs, including LSD, PCP, marijuana, and tranquilizers with her boyfriend, Dag Drollet. During this time, she began a modelling career.

In 1989, Cheyenne suffered a serious injury. Over the phone, her father had denied a request for her to go to Toronto to visit him; at the time he was filming The Freshman. In anger, she confiscated her boyfriend's Jeep and raced towards the airport. She was nearing 100 miles per hour when she crashed into a tree. She sustained a broken jaw, a laceration under her eye, and a torn ear. Marlon Brando flew Cheyenne to Los Angeles to undergo extensive reconstructive and cosmetic surgery. The crash effectively ended her modelling career. After the crash, she began experiencing bouts of depression and she attempted suicide.

== Death of Dag Drollet ==
In May 1987, Cheyenne began dating 23-year-old Dag Drollet. His father Jacques Drollet was a former member of the Assembly of French Polynesia. The pair were introduced at a family party, as the Brandos and Drollets had been longtime friends. In 1989, Cheyenne became pregnant with Dag's child. At Marlon Brando's request, the couple moved to the United States and into Marlon's Mulholland Drive home to await the birth of their child.

On May 16, 1990, Drollet was fatally shot by Cheyenne's elder half-brother Christian at their father's home. Christian Brando maintained that the shooting was accidental. He stated that earlier in the evening, Cheyenne had told him that Drollet was physically abusing her. Later that night, Christian confronted Drollet about the abuse. Christian claimed that the gun went off after Drollet tried to take the gun away from him.

Christian Brando was arrested and charged with first-degree murder two days later. The prosecutors of the case attempted to subpoena Cheyenne to testify at Christian's trial as they felt her account of the night's event was crucial in proving the shooting was premeditated. However, she refused to testify and fled to Tahiti. On June 26, 1990, she gave birth to a son she named Tuki Brando. Soon after Tuki's birth, Cheyenne attempted suicide twice and was hospitalized for drug detoxification in a psychiatric hospital. On December 22, 1990, Cheyenne was declared "mentally disabled" by a French judge and was deemed unable to testify in her brother's trial.

Without Cheyenne's testimony, prosecutors felt they could no longer prove that Drollet's death was premeditated. They presented Christian Brando with a plea deal. Christian took the deal and pleaded guilty to the lesser charge of voluntary manslaughter. He was sentenced to ten years in prison. He served a total of five years and was placed on three years' probation. In an interview given after his release, Christian stated that he doubted Cheyenne's accusations of physical abuse against Drollet due to her mental instability. "I feel like a complete chump for believing her," he said.

== Aftermath and final years ==
In the years following Drollet's death and her half-brother Christian's arrest, Cheyenne's mental health steadily declined. She repeatedly entered drug rehabilitation facilities and psychiatric hospitals. Cheyenne also publicly accused her father of molesting her and accused him of being an accomplice in Drollet's death; Marlon Brando denied both accusations. Cheyenne retracted her statement of Marlon being an accomplice to Drollet's murder, "However, I must tell you that I retracted my accusation of complicity that I made at the moment of Dag's death because I was traumatized". Her mental state was the cause of various conflicting testimonies and accusations, which meant her competency as a witness in court was highly questionable.

Cheyenne was later formally diagnosed with schizophrenia, became isolated from her former friends, and ultimately lost custody of her son Tuki to her mother, who raised him in Tahiti. As an adult, Tuki Brando entered medical school and like his mother became a model.

== Death ==
On April 16, 1995, Brando hanged herself at her mother's house in Puna'auia, Tahiti. Neither her father nor her half-brother Christian attended her funeral in Tahiti. She is buried in the Roman Catholic Uranie Cemetery in Papeete in the family crypt of Dag Drollet's family.
