= Tarita Teriipaia =

French Polynesian actress (born 1941)

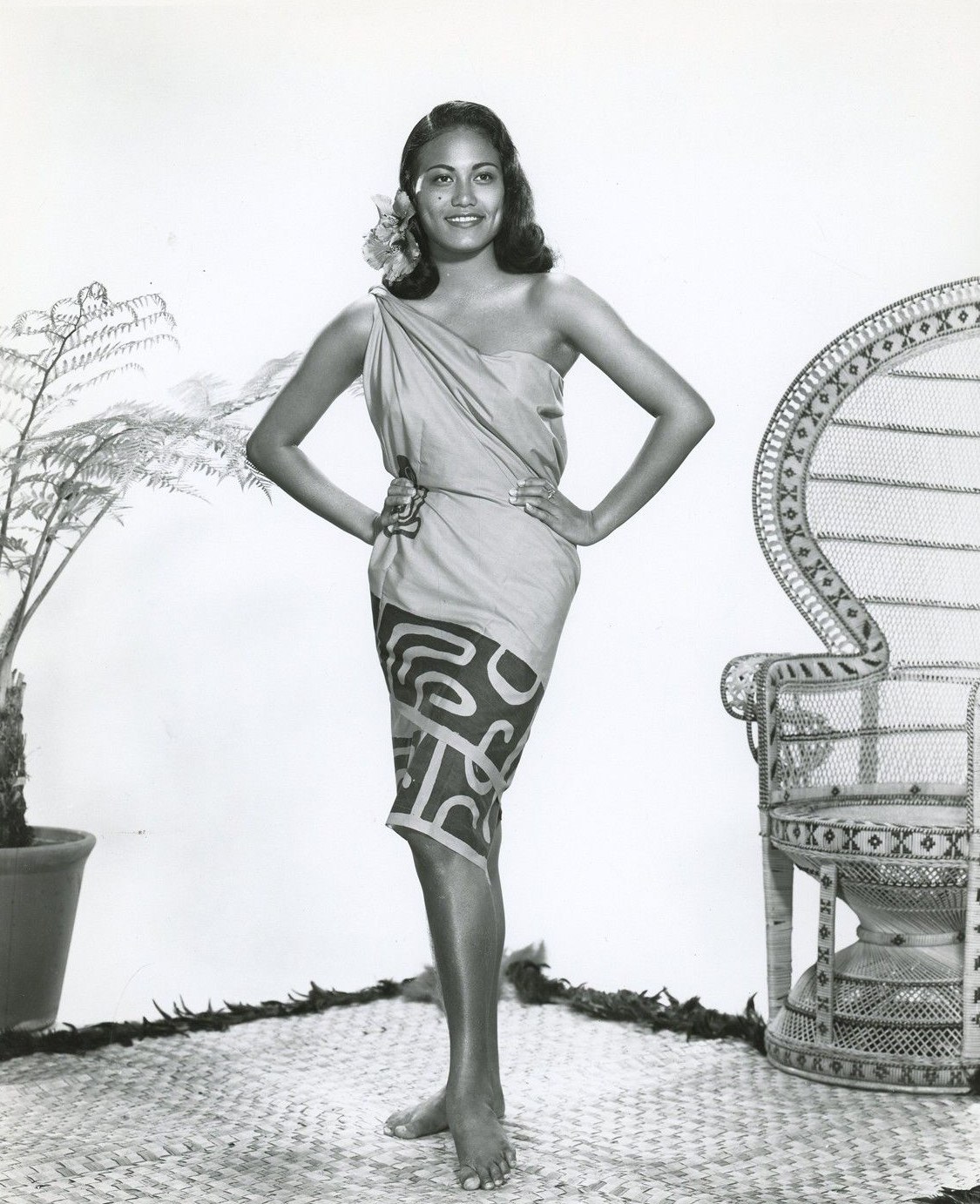
- Teriipaia in 1963
- Born: Tarita-Tumi Teriipaia; 30 December 1941 (age 84); Bora Bora, French Polynesia
- Occupation: Actress
- Years active: 1962–1963
- Partner: Marlon Brando (1962–1972)
- Children: 4, including Cheyenne
- Parent(s): Teri'iehira Teriipaia (father); Tetuareva Turia (mother)

Tarita Teriipaia (born 30 December 1941) is a retired actress of French Polynesian and Chinese descent who was in a relationship with actor Marlon Brando.

== Biography ==
Born in Bora Bora, French Polynesia, she played Maimiti opposite Marlon Brando in the film Mutiny on the Bounty (1962), for which she received a Golden Globe nomination for Best Supporting Actress. She became romantically involved with Brando in 1962. The two were never officially married, despite having children together, often living together, and referring to each other as wife and husband. According to Bernard Judge, "Though they lived together and stayed together for the rest of his life, and Marlon always took care of her and their children, they never got married." Therefore, they never divorced, but their romantic relationship declined in 1972. She is the mother of two of Brando's children, a son, Simon Teihotu (born in 1963) and a daughter, Tarita Cheyenne (1970–1995). Her daughter died by suicide in 1995. Following their separation, Brando also legally adopted Maimiti (born 1976), Tarita's daughter from a previous relationship, and Raiatua (born 1981), Tarita's niece. Only months after Marlon Brando's death in 2004, Tarita published her memoir titled Marlon, My Love and My Torment.

== Filmography ==
- Mutiny on the Bounty (1962) as Princess Maimiti

== See also ==
- Tetiʻaroa
