= Air Tetiaroa =

Airline from French Polynesia

IATA	ICAO	Call sign
—	TOA	—
- Founded: 2013
- Commenced operations: 2014; 12 years ago
- Hubs: Faa'a International Airport (Papeete)
- Secondary hubs: Tetiaroa Airport
- Fleet size: 4
- Destinations: 49
- Headquarters: Tahiti, French Polynesia, France
- Employees: 30
- Website: https://www.air-tetiaroa.com/en/

Air Tetiaroa is a regional air carrier in French Polynesia. Its main hub is at Faa'a International Airport. The airline is named after Tetiaroa, a small atoll located in the Society Islands of French Polynesia, which was once a private island owned by actor Marlon Brando. The carrier provides private charter services throughout French Polynesia, connecting the main international airport to various island resorts. The carrier holds a French Polynesian aviation license and a French Civil Aviation Air Operator Certificate (AOC) that allows it to operate non-scheduled flights in French Polynesia. It is not authorized to issue a formal scheduled flight program.

== Fleet ==
Air Tetiaroa utilises two Britten-Norman BN-2 Islander aircraft for 8 passengers and, as of July 2026, two de Havilland Canada DHC-6 Twin Otter "DHC-6-300" aircraft.

== Services ==
Air Tetiaroa mostly operates flights on demand, for a varied, demanding clientele, that includes luxury tourists, private business travelers, companies, Polynesian administrations and the French State. As a result, Air Tetiaroa flies to all the airfields in French Polynesia and provides services to the populations of the five archipelagos. There are some schedule services between Faa'a International Airport and Tetiaroa island.

== History ==
Air Tetiaroa was founded in 2013 by Pacific Beachcomber, a hotel and resort company that owns several luxury resorts in French Polynesia, including The Brando Resort, which is located on Tetiaroa. The airline was created to provide transportation services for guests of The Brando, as well as other visitors to the island. It officially commenced operations in 2014.

== Destinations ==
=== Charter ===
Airport
Faa'a International Airport
Bora Bora Airport
Moorea Airport
Huahine Airport
Raiatea Airport
Tetiaroa Airport
Tikehau Airport
