= Pointe Vénus Lighthouse =

Lighthouse in Tahiti, French Polynesia

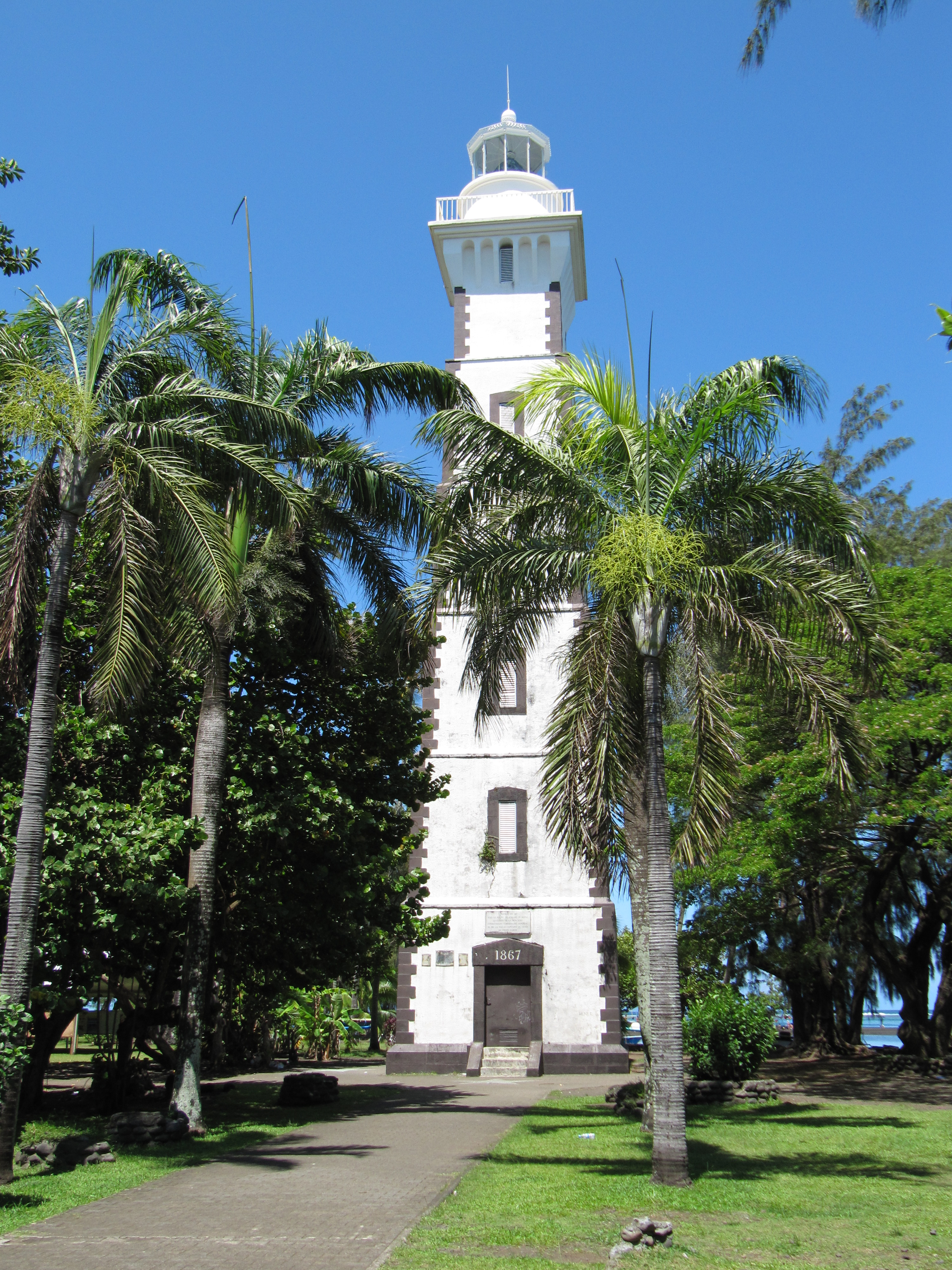
- Location: Māhina, French Polynesia, France
- Coordinates: 17°29′42″S 149°29′39″W

Tower
- Constructed: 1867
- Height: 33 m (108 ft)
- Shape: square
- Operator: French lighthouses and sea-marks service

Light
- Focal height: 31 m (102 ft)
- Range: 24 nmi (44 km; 28 mi)
- Characteristic: Fl W 5s

The Pointe Vénus lighthouse (Teara o Tahiti or Tepaina venuti) is a lighthouse located in the commune of Mahina, in the far north of the island of Tahiti in French Polynesia. It marks the north of the island and marks the bay of Matavai. It was the first lighthouse in the South Pacific, and remains the only lighthouse in Tahiti.

== History ==
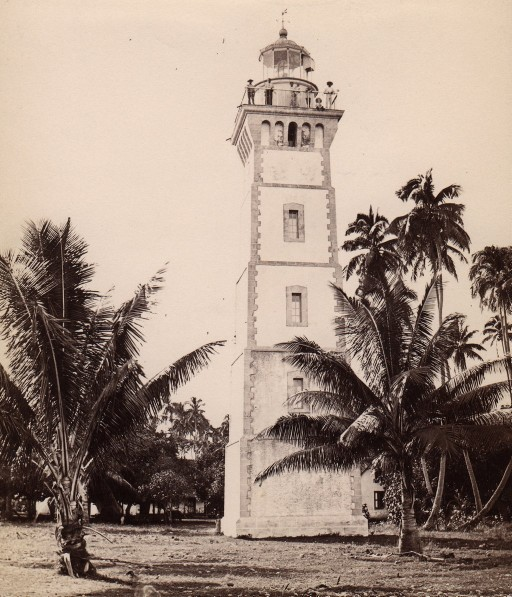
Pointe Venus Lighthouse between 1860 and 1879

Point Venus owes its name to the observatory that James Cook built in 1770 to observe the transit of Venus. This point was the landing place for many explorers such as Louis Antoine de Bougainville and Samuel Wallis. A lantern was first placed on the site in 1856, after an application was made to do so in 1851. The lighthouse was constructed in 1867, by Mangarevian workers. It was lit for the first time on 1 January 1868. It was then equipped with a fixed white light, visible at 15 miles.

During the Second World War, it was camouflaged by the inhabitants who painted it with coconut palms with their palms and their nuts to remove any point of reference for a Japanese landing fleet.

== Current lighthouse ==
The lighthouse is currently a square tower of eight floors, built in rubble and coral to a height of 25 meters. It was raised 9 meters, adding an extra floor to the original seven in 1953. The lighthouse was first fitted with an electric light in 1973.

The lighthouse is also used today for aerial navigation thanks to additional lenses for aerial beams.

Renovations to restore the lighthouse and install a new lighting system were announced in November 2023, with a budget of 160 million francs.

== See also ==
- List of lighthouses in French Polynesia
