= John McSweeney Jr. =

American film editor

- Born: John Fleming McSweeney Jr. August 26, 1915; New York, U.S.
- Died: May 19, 1999 (aged 83); Redondo Beach, California, U.S.
- Occupation: Film editor
- Spouse: Peggy McSweeney (m. 1947)
- Children: 6

John Fleming McSweeney Jr. (August 26, 1915 - May 19, 1999) was an American film editor. He was nominated for an Academy Award in the category Best Film Editing for the film Mutiny on the Bounty.

McSweeney died on May 19, 1999, of natural causes at his home in Redondo Beach, California, at the age of 83. He was buried at Holy Cross Cemetery.

== Selected filmography ==
- Mutiny on the Bounty (1962)
