= Lantern tree =

Lantern tree is a common name for several plants and may refer to:

- Crinodendron hookerianum, or Chilean lantern tree
- Dichrostachys cinerea, or Chinese lantern tree, native to Africa and widely introduced
- Hernandia nymphaeifolia, or Chinese lantern tree, native to coastal areas throughout the tropics
- Koelreuteria, or Chinese lantern tree, native to southern and eastern Asia
- Nymania capensis, or Chinese lantern tree, native to southern Africa
