= Mutiny on the Bounty (1962 film) =

1962 film by Lewis Milestone

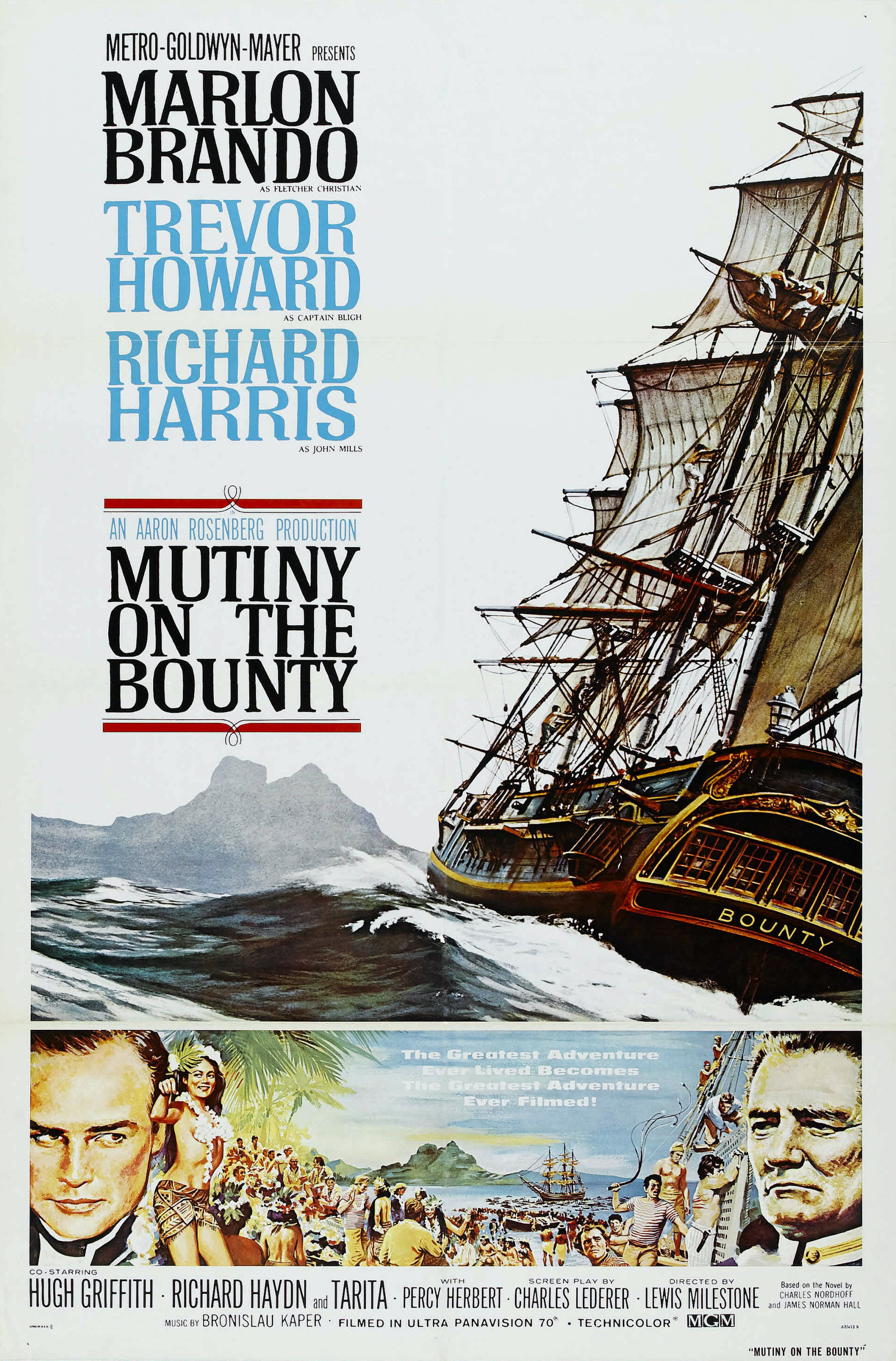
- Original film poster by Reynold Brown
- Directed by: Lewis Milestone
- Screenplay by: Charles Lederer
- Based on: Mutiny on the Bounty (1932 novel) by: Charles Nordhoff; James Norman Hall
- Produced by: Aaron Rosenberg
- Starring: Marlon Brando; Trevor Howard; Richard Harris; Hugh Griffith; Richard Haydn; Tarita
- Cinematography: Robert L. Surtees
- Edited by: John McSweeney Jr.
- Music by: Bronisław Kaper
- Production company: Arcola Pictures
- Distributed by: Metro-Goldwyn-Mayer
- Release date: November 8, 1962
- Running time: 178 minutes
- Country: United States
- Language: English
- Budget: $19 million or $17 million
- Box office: $13.7 million

Mutiny on the Bounty is a 1962 American historical drama film released by Metro-Goldwyn-Mayer, directed by Lewis Milestone and starring Marlon Brando, Trevor Howard, Richard Harris, Hugh Griffith, Richard Haydn and Tarita in her only role. The screenplay was written by Charles Lederer (with uncredited input from Eric Ambler, William L. Driscoll, Borden Chase, John Gay, and Ben Hecht), based on the 1932 novel by Charles Nordhoff and James Norman Hall. Bronisław Kaper composed the score.

The film tells a heavily fictionalized story of the real-life mutiny led by Fletcher Christian against William Bligh, captain of HMAV Bounty, in 1789. It is the second American film produced by MGM to be based on the novel, the first being the 1935 film of the same name, which was also based on the Nordhoff-Hall novel.

Mutiny on the Bounty was the first motion picture filmed in the Ultra Panavision 70 widescreen process. It was partly shot on location in the South Pacific and became the most expensive film ever made (soon replaced by Cleopatra). The film had a troubled production, with Marlon Brando clashing with original director Carol Reed and eventually facilitating his firing and replacement with Lewis Milestone. This was Milestone's final film before his death in 1980.

The film was released by Metro-Goldwyn-Mayer on November 8, 1962. It received mixed-to-negative reviews from critics and was a box office flop, losing more than $6 million (equivalent to $64 million in 2025). Nonetheless, Mutiny on the Bounty was nominated for seven Oscars at the 35th Academy Awards, including for Best Picture.

== Plot ==
In 1787, HMS Bounty sets sail from England for Tahiti under the command of William Bligh. His mission is to collect a shipload of breadfruit saplings and transport them to Jamaica, in the hopes that they can be used as cheap food for plantation slaves. Bligh is an experienced seaman and a competent officer, but also arrogant, dismissive of his green crew, and eager to complete the unpleasant voyage as quickly as possible.

The voyage gets off to a difficult start when a sailor, John Mills, is severely flogged for accusing Bligh of stealing cheese from the ship's stores to the disgust of Acting Lieutenant Fletcher Christian. Bligh tries to reach Tahiti sooner by attempting the shorter westbound route around Cape Horn. The strategy fails and the Bounty backtracks eastward, costing the mission much precious time. Bligh blames the men, cutting their rations and working them even harder.

When the Bounty reaches her destination, the crew revels in the easygoing life of the tropical paradise – and in the free-love practices of the Tahitian women. Christian himself is smitten with Maimiti, daughter of the Tahitian king. Bligh's agitation is further fueled by learning that the dormancy period of the breadfruit means more wasted months until the plants can be potted. As departure day nears, three men, including Mills, attempt to desert but are caught by Christian and clapped in irons by Bligh.

Bligh decides to take twice as many plants as planned for, ordering the crew to be allotted less water so they can be watered properly. A thirst-stricken crewmember falls to his death, and his mate is fatally keelhauled for striking Bligh in anger. Mills taunts Christian, trying to egg him on to challenge Bligh. When a third man becomes gravely ill from drinking seawater, Christian attempts to give him fresh water in violation of the captain's orders. Bligh beats Christian when he ignores his second order to stop. In response, Christian backhands Bligh. Bligh informs Christian that he will be tried and likely hanged when they reach port.

With nothing left to lose, Christian seizes command of the ship and sets Bligh and a group of loyalists adrift in the longboat with a compass and meager rations, telling them to make for the island of Tofua. Bligh, bent on revenge, avoids Tofua and the rest of the islands by lying to his loyalists about the locals there practicing cannibalism, and instead crossing the Pacific westward in order to reach the Dutch colony of Kupang at Timor. He returns to Britain with remarkable speed and weeks later, a court-martial exonerates Bligh of any misdeeds for the loss of the Bounty and recommends an expedition to arrest the mutineers and bring them to trial. To Bligh's dismay, however, the court also determines that his appointment to command Bounty was a mistake. This conclusion is based on the fact that several superb officers with commendable records participated in the mutiny against him.

Christian sails back to Tahiti to pick up supplies, Maimiti and the girlfriends of the crew. They sail for a permanent home until reaching Pitcairn Island, which is marked incorrectly on British naval charts and would therefore be impossible to find. However, once on Pitcairn, Christian decides to sail home, fearing that Bligh will be exonerated without his testimony. In response, Mills orders the Bounty set aflame while Christian is searching for Bligh's sextant. The mortally burned Christian escapes and dies next to Maimiti as the flaming Bounty sinks.

== Cast ==
- Marlon Brando as Lieutenant Fletcher Christian
- Trevor Howard as Captain William Bligh
- Richard Harris as Gunner's Mate John Mills
- Hugh Griffith as Alexander Smith
- Richard Haydn as William Brown, horticulturalist
- Tarita as Princess Maimiti (based on Mauatua)
- Tim Seely as Midshipman Edward Young
- Percy Herbert as Matthew Quintal
- Gordon Jackson as Edward Burkitt (Thomas Burkett)
- Noel Purcell as William McCoy, helmsman
- Duncan Lamont as John Williams
- Chips Rafferty as Michael Byrne
- Ashley Cowan as Samuel Mack (John Samuel), Captain's clerk
- Eddie Byrne as John Fryer, sailing master
- Keith McConnell as James Morrison, Boatswain's mate
- Frank Silvera as Minarii

Uncredited

- Antoinette Bower as Lady Gwendenare
- Alan Callow as Midshipman Thomas Hayward
- Michael Dugan as Quartermaster John Norton
- Henry Daniell as Chief-Justice of Court Martial
- Ben Wright as Graves
- Torin Thatcher as Staines
- Matahiarii Tama as Chief Hitihiti (Pōmare I)

Credits from the AFI Catalog of Feature Films.

== Production ==
=== Development and writing ===
Following the success of 1935's Mutiny on the Bounty, director Frank Lloyd announced plans in 1940 to make a sequel that focused on Captain Bligh in later life, to star Spencer Tracy or Charles Laughton. No film resulted. In 1945 Casey Wilson wrote a script for Christian of the Bounty, which was to star Clark Gable as Fletcher Christian and focus on Christian's life on Pitcairn Island. This was never filmed. In the 1950s, MGM remade a number of their earlier successes in color and widescreen formats, including Scaramouche and The Prisoner of Zenda. They decided to remake Mutiny on the Bounty, and in 1958 the studio announced that Aaron Rosenberg would produce the film. Marlon Brando was mentioned as a possible star.

Eric Ambler was signed to write a script at $5,000 per week. It was supposed to combine material from the Nordhoff and Hall novels Mutiny on the Bounty and Pitcairn Island. MGM also owned the rights to a third book, Men Against the Sea, which dealt with Bligh's boat voyage after the mutiny. In 1959, Paramount announced that it would make a rival Bounty film, to be written and directed by James Clavell and called The Mutineers. It would focus on the fate of the Mutineers on Pitcairn Island. However, this project did not proceed.

Rosenberg said the film would focus more on the fate of the crew after the mutiny, with Captain Bligh only in a minor role and the mutiny dealt with in flashback. "It was Brando's idea", said Rosenberg. "And he was right. It has always been fascinating to wonder what happened to the mutineers afterwards." "The mood after the mutiny must be one of hope", said Reed. "The men hope to live a different sort of life, a life without suffering, without brutality. They hope for a life without sick ambitions, without the pettiness of personal success. They dream of a new life where nobody is trying to outdo the next person."

Ambler says his brief was to make Fletcher Christian's part as interesting as Bligh's. MGM executives were unhappy with Ambler's script, although the writer estimated he did 14 drafts. John Gay was signed to write a version in July 1960. Eventually, William Driscoll, Borden Chase (writing in August 1960), Howard Clewes and Charles Lederer wrote all the scripts. According to one report, Ambler did the first third of the film, about the journey, Driscoll did the second, about life on Tahiti, and Chase did the third, about the mutiny and afterwards. Gay wrote the narration. Lederer was included before filming was to begin.

=== Casting ===
Marlon Brando eventually signed with MGM, at a fee of $500,000 plus 10% of the profits. Carol Reed was hired to direct. In order to take full advantage of Technicolor and the widescreen format (shooting in MGM Camera 65), the production was to be filmed on location in Tahiti, with cinematographer Robert Surtees. The film was set to begin shooting on October 15, 1960. It was nicknamed "MGM's Ben Hur of 1961." Brando wrote in his memoirs that he was offered the lead in Lawrence of Arabia around the same time but chose the Bounty because he preferred to go to Tahiti, a place that had long fascinated him, rather than film six months in the desert. "Lean was a very good director, but he took so long to make a movie that I would have dried up in the desert like a puddle of water", wrote Brando.

In July 1960, Peter Finch signed to play Bligh. However, by August the role had gone to Trevor Howard. Brando personally selected a local Tahitian, Tarita, to play his love interest. They began a real relationship in 1962, had children, and separated by 1972.

=== Filming ===
==== Under Carol Reed ====
A working replica of the Bounty was constructed in Nova Scotia at a cost of $750,000 and was sailed to Tahiti. The ship took nine months to build rather than the scheduled six and arrived in Tahiti after filming had begun. Shooting was originally scheduled to begin in October 1960; however, problems with the script and delays in construction of the ship pushed it back until November. More than 150 members of the cast and crew arrived in Tahiti, and MGM rented over 200 hotel rooms.

Shooting commenced on November 28. Filming was difficult, partly because the script was being rewritten and Brando was reportedly ad-libbing much of his part. Production costs were also high due to the remote location. Despite the ongoing changes to the script and the production's financial and logistical problems, Brando later wrote about how much he enjoyed the island and his interactions with its native people:

From the moment I saw it, reality surpassed even my fantasies about Tahiti, and I had some of the best times of my life making Mutiny on the Bounty. The filming was done largely on a replica of H.M.S. Bounty anchored offshore, and every day as soon as the director said, "Cut" for the last time, I ripped off my British naval officer's uniform and dove off the ship into the bay to swim with the Tahitian extras working on the movie. Often we only did two or three shots a day, which left me hours to enjoy their company, and I grew to love them for their love of life.

In January 1961, after three months of filming, Reed flew back from location with an "undisclosed ailment". Reportedly, his departure was due to bouts with gallstones and heat stroke, although other reports stated that Reed was instead unhappy over differences with the direction of the story. By that time, the rainy season had arrived, so filming halted and the unit returned to Hollywood.

Reed's wife, Penelope Dudley-Ward, wrote to her cousin David Birkin from the Beverly Wilshire Hotel on February 25:

Poor Carol is going through such agony here (mental this time) with this film. They put tremendous pressure on him to start shooting - much against his will - before the script was anything like completed (because the company was committed with contracts), and now, after three months shooting, the last quarter of the film is still not written, nor is the beginning. All the top people - the heads of the studio, the producer, the New York office - are quarrelling among themselves and in a panic from their own inefficiency - and now they are all starting to blame Carol for being slow! The poor thing is setting up the camera before he even knows what he's going to shoot that day! There is a big meeting at the studio this morning (Saturday) so perhaps he'll get the sack, and then we'll come home, and that will be wonderful. [...] Poor Carol, he has been so tactful with them all, and has done such a marvellous job so far, as no one else could have done, under the most difficult and trying circumstances."

When MGM demanded that Reed finish the film within 100 days, the director replied that he needed 139, so the studio fired him. Brando claims in his memoirs that Reed was dismissed by MGM because he wanted to make Bligh the hero.

==== Under Lewis Milestone ====
Reed was replaced by Lewis Milestone, in what turned out to be his last job at directing a theatrical film. "Reed was used to making his own pictures", said Milestone. "He was not used to producer, studio and star interference. But those of us who have been around Hollywood are like alley cats. We know this style. We know how to survive."

Milestone later said, "I felt it would be an easy assignment because they'd been on it for months and there surely couldn't be much left to do." However, Milestone then discovered that only one seven-minute scene (Bligh giving instructions about obtaining breadfruit) had been completed.

In March 1961, filming resumed at MGM studios in Culver City. Milestone said that for his first two weeks on the film "Brando behaved himself and I got a lot of stuff done", such as the arrival of the Bounty at Tahiti. The director says he "got on beautifully with" the British actors. "They were real human beings and I had a lot of fun."

Milestone says "the trouble started" after the first two weeks. He summarised the cause: "The producer made a number of promises to Marlon Brando which he couldn't keep. It was an impossible situation because, right or wrong, the man simply took charge of everything. You had the option of sitting and watching him or turning your back on him. Neither the producers nor I could do anything about it."

The unit returned to Tahiti in April 1961. Filming was plagued by bad weather and continuing script problems. Richard Harris clashed with Brando, and Brando was frequently late to set and difficult while filming.

"Marlon did not have approval of the story", said Milestone. "But he did have approval of himself. If Brando did not like something, he would just stand in front of the camera and not act. He thought only of himself. At the same time, he was right in many things that he wanted. He is too cerebral to play the part of Mr. Christian the way Clark Gable played it."

Milestone said the script was constantly being rewritten on set by Charles Lederer with input from Rosenberg, Sol Siegel and Joseph Vogel, as well as Brando. Milestone said Lederer often worked on the script with Brando in the morning, and shooting did not begin until the afternoon. Milestone said "you had the option of shooting it, but since Marlon Brando was going to supervise it anyway, I waited until someone yelled 'camera' and went off to sit down somewhere and read the paper."

The film ended up costing $10 million more than originally expected. Adding to the turmoil of the production's woes, a Tahitian was killed while filming a canoe sequence.

"I have been in this business a few days but I never saw anything like this", said Milestone. "It was like being in a hurricane on a rudderless ship without a captain. I thought when I took the job that it would be a nice trip. By the time it was finished, I felt as though I had been shanghaied."

"The big trouble was lack of guts by management at Metro", said Milestone. "Lack of vision. When they realised there was so much trouble with the script they should have stopped the whole damn production. If they did not like Marlon's behavior they should have told him that he must do as they wished or else they should have taken him out of the picture. But they just did not have the guts." Shooting was ultimately finished by October 1961.

=== Post-production ===
In May 1962, work was still being done on the script and the film. The studio was unhappy with the ending. A number of writers, including Brando, pitched ideas. Eventually, Billy Wilder suggested the ending that was shot. Milestone refused to direct it, so George Seaton shot Christian's death scene in August 1962.

The Saturday Evening Post ran an article about the making of the film which Brando felt disparaged him. He sued them for $5 million. Brando convinced MGM president Joseph Vogel to speak in support of his suit; the tactic backfired and was later used against Vogel when he resigned, not long after the release of the film.

== Release ==
=== Box office ===
The cost overruns led to Sol Siegel departing as head of production in early 1962 replaced by Robert Weitman. In May 1962 Vogel acknowledged the film cost $20,000,000, more than twice its original estimates, which meant it would need $40 million to make a profit. Vogel said he expected the film to gross $27,000,000 during its first run and would be profitable "in the long run. This is the kind of picture that can live for years. It won't go out of style."

The film was the fifth highest-grossing film of 1962 grossing $13,680,000 domestically, earning $7.4 million in US theatrical rentals by the end of the year. Variety estimated the rentals would go up to $9.8 million.

However, it needed to make $30 million to recoup its budget of $19 million. This meant the film was a box office flop. The studio lost $17 million that year.

The movie was one of a series of spectacles from MGM around this time, along with King of Kings, How the West Was Won, Brothers Grimm and Four Horsemen of the Apocalypse.

=== Home media ===
Ford paid a record $2.3 million for the television rights for one screening in the United States. The film was shown on ABC on Sunday, September 24, 1967, which included a restored prologue and epilogue, cut from release prints of the film before its roadshow premiere, wherein HMS Briton comes across the uncharted island in 1814, and its crew encounters Brown as the only surviving member of the Bounty mutineers (who eventually killed each other out of hate), along with surviving Tahiti islanders, and although Brown is willing to return and face the consequences of their actions, Captain Staines (played by Torin Thatcher) informs him that it is no longer necessary, as the Articles of War had been changed 10 years prior. These pieces were included as bonus features on the film's DVD release in 2006.

== Reception ==
=== Critical response ===
On the review aggregator website Rotten Tomatoes, 70% of 20 critics' reviews are positive, with an average rating of 6.5/10. The website's consensus reads: "a visually splendid but notoriously bloated spectacle."

Metacritic, which uses a weighted average, assigned the film a score of 48 out of 100, based on 7 critics, indicating "mixed or average reviews".

Bosley Crowther of The New York Times wrote: "There's much that is eye-filling and gripping as pure spectacle", but criticized Marlon Brando for making Fletcher Christian "more a dandy than a formidable ship's officer ... one feels the performance is intended either as a travesty or a lark." Variety called the film "often overwhelmingly spectacular" and "generally superior" to the 1935 version, adding, "Brando in many ways is giving the finest performance of his career."

Brendan Gill of The New Yorker wrote that the screenwriter and directors "haven't failed, but a genuine success has been beyond their grasp. One reason for this is that they've received no help from Marlon Brando, who plays Fletcher Christian as a sort of seagoing Hamlet. Since what Fletcher Christian has to say is so much less interesting than what Hamlet has to say, Mr. Brando's tortured scowlings seem thoroughly out of place. Indeed, we tend to sympathize with the wicked Captain Bligh, well played by Trevor Howard. No wonder he behaved badly, with that highborn young fop provoking him at every turn!" Richard L. Coe of The Washington Post called the film an "unquestionably handsome spectacular" that "teeters headlong into absurdity" in its third hour, summarizing: "It would seem that the mutiny occurred only because the hero blew his top and is egotistically disturbed because he did so." The Monthly Film Bulletin of the UK criticized Brando for an "outrageously phony upper-class English accent" and the direction for "looking suspiciously like a multiple hack job." Time wrote that the film "wanders through the hoarse platitudes of witless optimism until at last it is swamped with sentimental bilge."

Margaret Booth of MGM later called the film "all bad" and "a big chore" to work on.

Mutiny on the Bounty's difficult and problematic production, Brando's temperamental and eccentric behavior, the overwhelmingly negative reviews of Brando's performance and the box office failure of the film combined to damage Brando's career and star power which was revived only with the release of The Godfather ten years later. Director Milestone later stated he found Brando's performance in Mutiny on the Bounty "horrible".

=== Awards and nominations ===
| Award | Category | Nominee(s) | Result | Ref. |
|---|---|---|---|---|
| Academy Awards | Best Picture | Aaron Rosenberg | Nominated | |
| Academy Awards | Best Art Direction – Color | Art Direction: George W. Davis, J. McMillan Johnson; Set Decoration: Henry Grace, Hugh Hunt | Nominated | |
| Academy Awards | Best Cinematography – Color | Robert Surtees | Nominated | |
| Academy Awards | Best Film Editing | John McSweeney Jr. | Nominated | |
| Academy Awards | Best Music Score – Substantially Original | Bronisław Kaper | Nominated | |
| Academy Awards | Best Song | "Love Song from Mutiny on the Bounty (Follow Me)"; Music by Bronisław Kaper; Lyrics by Paul Francis Webster | Nominated | |
| Academy Awards | Best Special Effects | Visual Effects by A. Arnold Gillespie; Audible Effects by Milo B. Lory | Nominated | |
| American Cinema Editors Awards | Best Edited Feature Film | John McSweeney Jr. | Nominated | |
| Directors Guild of America Awards | Outstanding Directorial Achievement in Motion Pictures | Lewis Milestone | Nominated | |
| Golden Globe Awards | Best Motion Picture – Drama | | Nominated | |
| Golden Globe Awards | Best Supporting Actress – Motion Picture | Tarita | Nominated | |
| Golden Globe Awards | Best Original Score – Motion Picture | Bronisław Kaper | Nominated | |
| Golden Reel Awards | Best Sound Editing – Feature Film | | Won (Note: Tied with Lonely Are the Brave.) | |
| International Film Music Critics Association Awards | Best New Release/Re-Release/Re-Recording of an Existing Score | Music: Bronislau Kaper; Album Producer & Liner Notes: Lukas Kendall; Liner Notes: Jeff Bond; Album Art Direction: Joe Sikoryak | Won | |
| Laurel Awards | Top Drama | | 4th Place | |
| Laurel Awards | Top Song | "Love Song from Mutiny on the Bounty (Follow Me)"; Music by Bronisław Kaper; Lyrics by Paul Francis Webster | Won | |

=== Honors ===
The film is recognized by American Film Institute in these lists:

- 2005: AFI's 100 Years of Film Scores – Nominated

== Comic book adaption ==
- Gold Key: Mutiny on the Bounty (February 1963)

== Legacy ==
Marlon Brando fell in love with Tahiti and in 1966 acquired a 99-year lease on the Tetiaroa atoll. He married (unofficially, according to some sources) Tarita Teriipaia on August 10, 1962. They had two children: Teihotu Brando (born 1963) and Tarita Cheyenne Brando (1970–1995). Brando and Teriipaia separated in July 1972.

== See also ==
- List of American films of 1962
- Bounty (1960 ship)
- The Mutiny of the Bounty (1916), a silent film
- In the Wake of the Bounty (1933), film debut of Erroll Flynn
- Mutiny on the Bounty (1935 film)
- The Bounty (1984 film)

== Notes ==
- Brando, Marlon (1994). Brando. Random House. ISBN 9780679410133.
- Higham, Charles; Greenberg, Joel (1971). The celluloid muse; Hollywood directors speak. Regnery.
