= The Brando Resort =

Resort on the atoll of Tetiaroa, French Polynesia

The Brando Resort on Tetiʻaroa
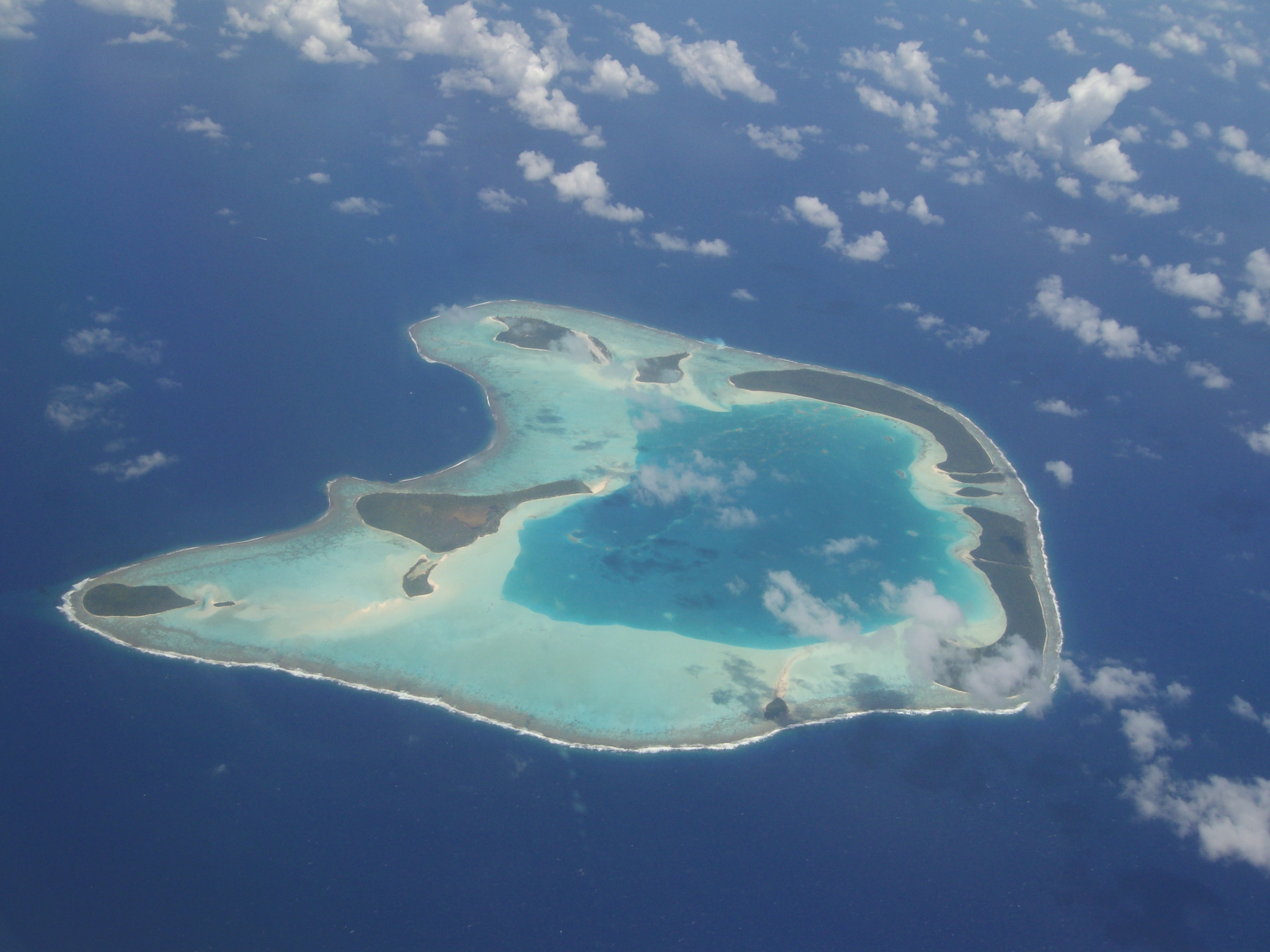
- Aerial view of The Brando Resort on Tetiꞌaroa

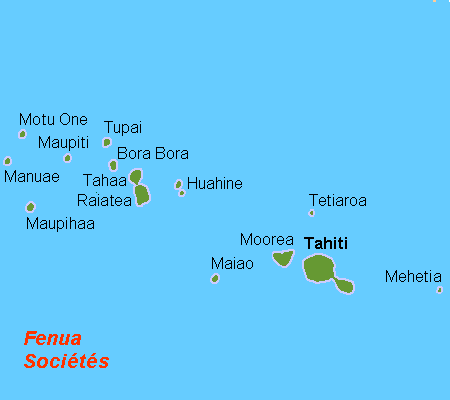

Geography
- Location: Pacific Ocean
- Coordinates: 17°0′S 149°33′W
- Archipelago: Society Islands
- Area: 6 km^{2} (2.3 sq mi)

Administration
- France
- Region: Overseas collectivity

Demographics
- Population: ~300

The Brando is a private resort on the Society Islands' Tetiʻaroa atoll in French Polynesia. It serves as a regulated airstrip, research facility, eco-resort and spa on the Onetahi motu. It consists of ~300 staff and facilities management personnel. The atoll's inside on which The Brando is located is on a 99-year lease contracted by Marlon Brando. Condé Nast Traveller described a site of "unspoiled beauty", "outlandish in its technicolor".

== Travel ==
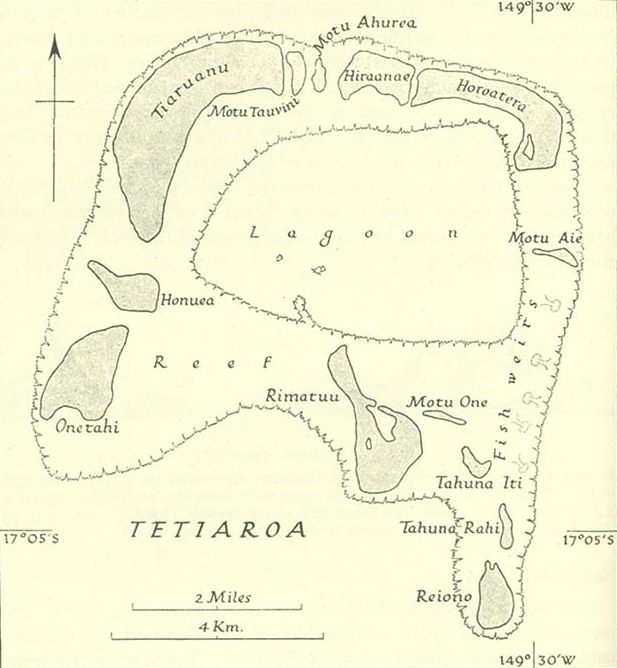
Tetiꞌaroa

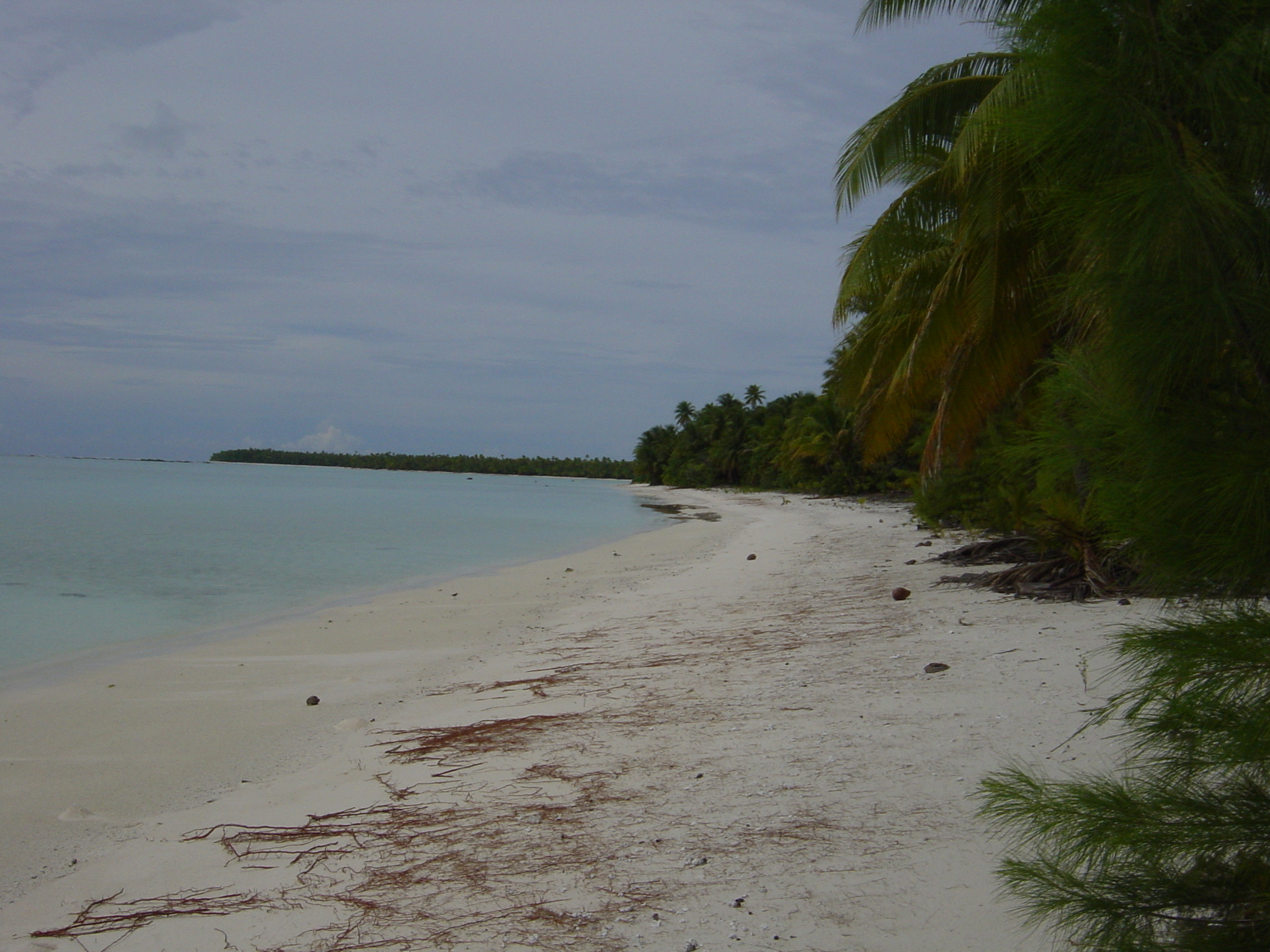
Onetahi

Traveling to The Brando can only be commercially done by air. Air Teti'aroa flies private planes between the island of Tahiti and Teti'aroa. The airline's departure is located in a private terminal at the Faa'a International Airport in Tahiti. Air Tetiaroa rates to The Brando Resort on Tetiaroa fluctuate with the regular, high and festive seasons.

== History ==
Construction of The Brando Resort began in 2009 by Teti'aroa Pacific Beachcomber SC. In September 2010 Pacific Beachcomber announced it was investing US$60 million in construction. The first phase of the building included repairing the airstrip runway for smoother plane landing and lengthening the tarmac to meet current aviation standards. Additionally, a reef dock was constructed to enable shipments from the ocean to the lagoon side of the reef.

In February 2014, it was announced that construction on The Brando Resort was officially completed. In July 2014, The Brando was officially open to the public. Eight of Marlon Brando’s eleven children were involved in the project along with the Brando Estate.

Since 2013, the resort had been in conflict with Teiki Pambrun, a navigator who had been living on a boat in the lagoon of the Tetiaroa atoll and who criticized the resort for its “environmental damages.” In 2014, a court issued a summary order requiring Pambrun to remain more than 10 kilometers from the atoll, under penalty of a fine of 100,000 CFP francs per day. In the absence of payment or leaving, on 22 January 2016, a court of appeal confirmed Pambrun’s expulsion from the lagoon. On 8 July 2016, the two parties announced in a joint press release that an amicable agreement had been reached, with the terms of the agreement not disclosed. Pambrun subsequently relocated to Huahine with his family.

In October 2016 the resort was named the world's best resort by Condé Nast.

== Ecology ==
The buildings are made using materials that are of local or certified origin, renewable, or recycled. There is a deep seawater air-conditioning (SWAC) system to reduce energy demands. Renewable energy sources such as solar power (from PV panels) and coconut oil (biofuel) are used. The zinc-bromine flow batteries (used for storing the power from the PV panels) are made from recyclable materials. The resort's vehicles are electric or human-powered.
