= Tetiʻaroa =

Atoll in French Polynesia

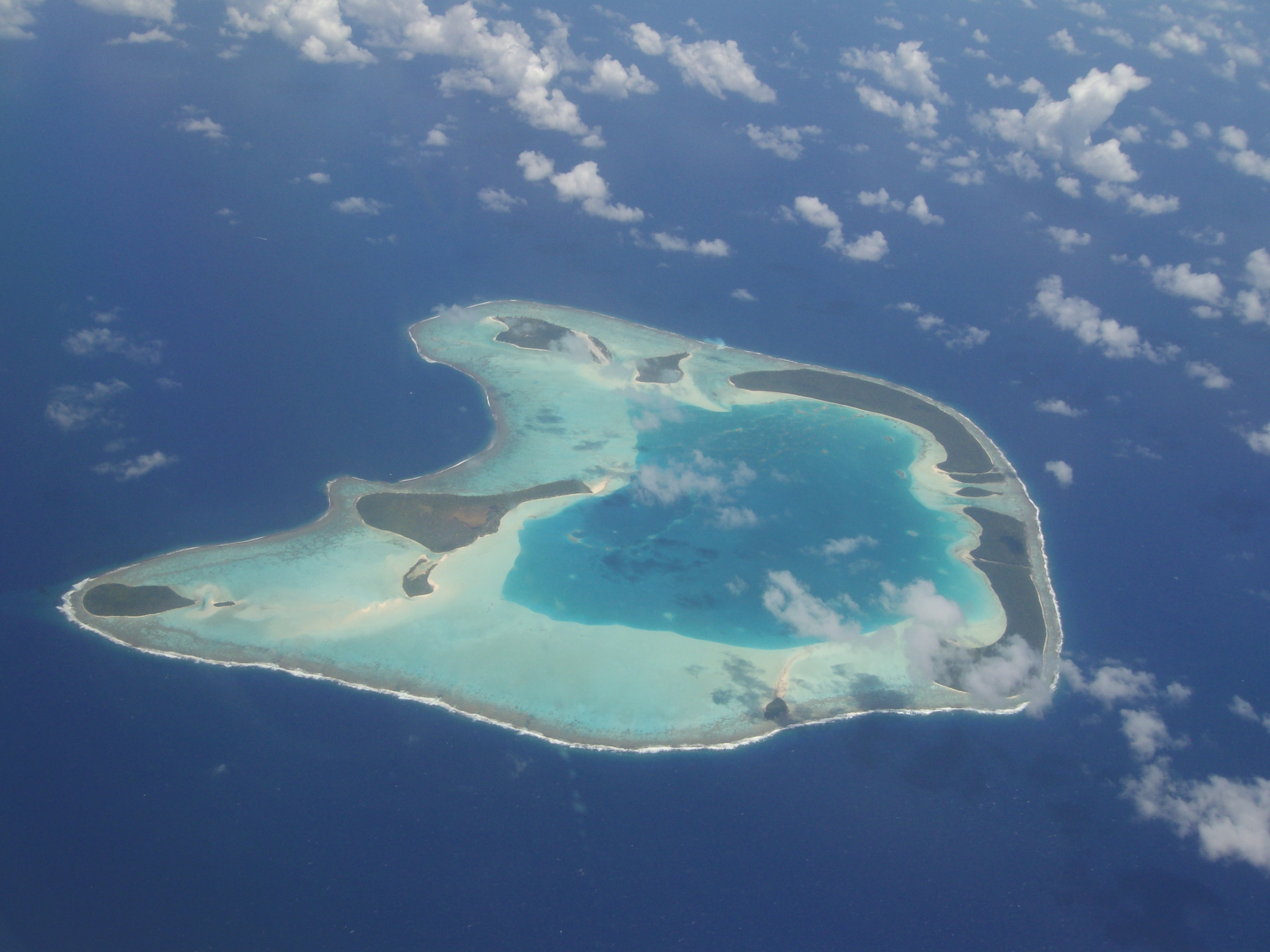
- Aerial view of Tetiʻaroa

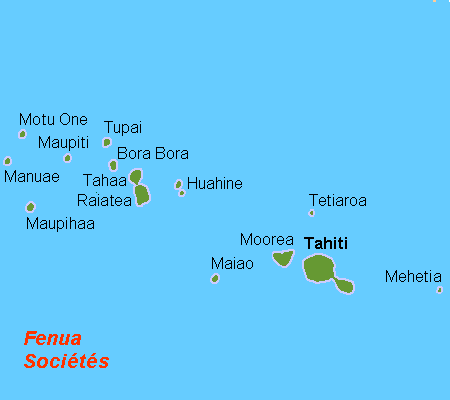

Geography
- Location: Pacific Ocean
- Coordinates: 17°0′S 149°33′W
- Archipelago: Society Islands
- Area: 6 km^{2} (2.3 sq mi)

Administration
- France
- Overseas collectivity: French Polynesia
- Administrative subdivision: Windward Islands
- Commune: Arue

Tetiʻaroa (French, officially: Tetiaroa, [tetjaʁɔa]) is an atoll in the Windward group of the Society Islands of French Polynesia, an overseas territorial collectivity of France in the Pacific Ocean. Administratively, it is part of the commune of Arue. Once a holiday location for Tahitian royalty, the islets are under a 99-year lease signed by the actor Marlon Brando, and are home to The Brando Resort, sublet to the Brando family.

== Geography ==
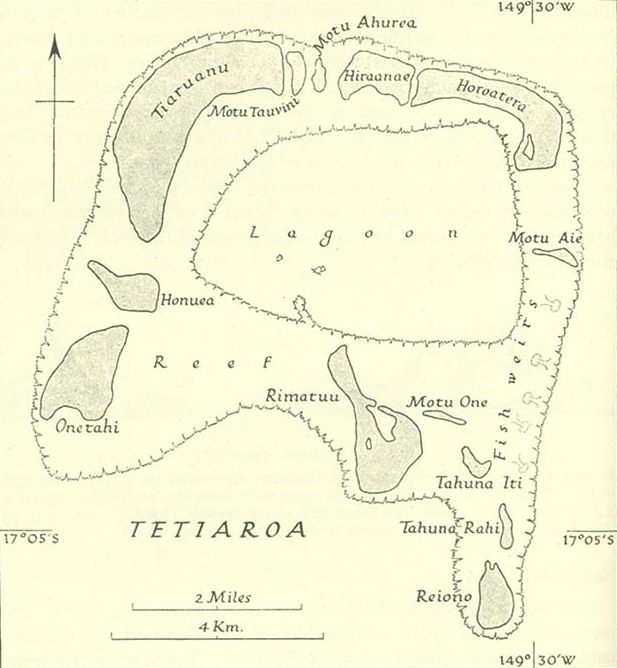
A map of Tetiʻaroa based on a map made in 1933.

Tetiʻaroa is administratively part of the commune of Arue, whose main part is in the northeastern part of Tahiti. The atoll is located 53 kilometres (33 mi) north of Tahiti. The atoll has a total surface area of 6 square kilometres (2 sq mi); approximately 585 hectares (1,450 acres) of sand divided by 12 motus (islets) with varying surface areas. The lagoon is approximately 7 kilometres (4.3 mi) wide and 30 metres (98 ft) deep. The atoll has no reef opening, making access by boat nearly impossible.

The islets (or motus), in clockwise order starting from the southwest corner, include: Onetahi (with regulated airstrip and site of The Brando Resort), Honuea, Tiaruanu, Motu Tauvini (Tauini), Motu Ahurea (Auroa), Hiraanae, Horoatera (Oroatera), Motu 'Ā'ie, Tahuna Iti, Tahuna Rahi, Reiono, Motu One (emerging sandbank) and Rimatu'u (with an ornithology reserve).

=== Climate ===
Tetiʻaroa has a tropical rainforest climate (Köppen Af), slightly above a tropical monsoon climate (Am). The average annual temperature in Tetiʻaroa is 26.3 °C (79.3 °F). The average annual rainfall is 1,883.1 mm (74.14 in) with December as the wettest month. The temperatures are highest on average in March, at around 27.3 °C (81.1 °F), and lowest in August, at around 24.9 °C (76.8 °F). The highest temperature ever recorded in Tetiʻaroa was 35.5 °C (95.9 °F) on 20 March 1995; the coldest temperature ever recorded was 14.5 °C (58.1 °F) on 25 July 1987.

Climate data for Tetiʻaroa (1981–2010 averages, extremes 1980−present)
Month	Jan	Feb	Mar	Apr	May	Jun	Jul	Aug	Sep	Oct	Nov	Dec	Year
Record high °C (°F)	35.0 (95.0)	34.8 (94.6)	35.5 (95.9)	35.0 (95.0)	33.0 (91.4)	33.0 (91.4)	32.4 (90.3)	32.0 (89.6)	33.0 (91.4)	34.5 (94.1)	34.0 (93.2)	35.0 (95.0)	35.5 (95.9)
Mean daily maximum °C (°F)	30.2 (86.4)	30.4 (86.7)	30.4 (86.7)	30.1 (86.2)	29.3 (84.7)	28.2 (82.8)	27.7 (81.9)	27.5 (81.5)	28.4 (83.1)	28.7 (83.7)	29.2 (84.6)	29.9 (85.8)	29.2 (84.6)
Daily mean °C (°F)	27.0 (80.6)	27.3 (81.1)	27.3 (81.1)	27.1 (80.8)	26.4 (79.5)	25.6 (78.1)	25.0 (77.0)	24.9 (76.8)	25.7 (78.3)	25.9 (78.6)	26.3 (79.3)	26.6 (79.9)	26.3 (79.3)
Mean daily minimum °C (°F)	23.7 (74.7)	24.1 (75.4)	24.2 (75.6)	24.2 (75.6)	23.5 (74.3)	23.0 (73.4)	22.4 (72.3)	22.3 (72.1)	23.0 (73.4)	23.2 (73.8)	23.5 (74.3)	23.4 (74.1)	23.4 (74.1)
Record low °C (°F)	16.0 (60.8)	17.9 (64.2)	17.6 (63.7)	17.0 (62.6)	17.0 (62.6)	18.0 (64.4)	14.5 (58.1)	15.0 (59.0)	17.0 (62.6)	15.0 (59.0)	16.0 (60.8)	17.0 (62.6)	14.5 (58.1)
Average rainfall mm (inches)	250.8 (9.87)	183.8 (7.24)	179.9 (7.08)	178.8 (7.04)	125.1 (4.93)	105.2 (4.14)	99.8 (3.93)	73.4 (2.89)	66.5 (2.62)	147.0 (5.79)	142.9 (5.63)	329.9 (12.99)	1,883.1 (74.14)
Average rainy days (≥ 1.0 mm)	16.3	14.1	14.3	12.2	11.8	9.7	10.7	8.3	7.4	10.4	12.8	17.7	145.6
Source: Meteociel

== History ==
=== Early years ===
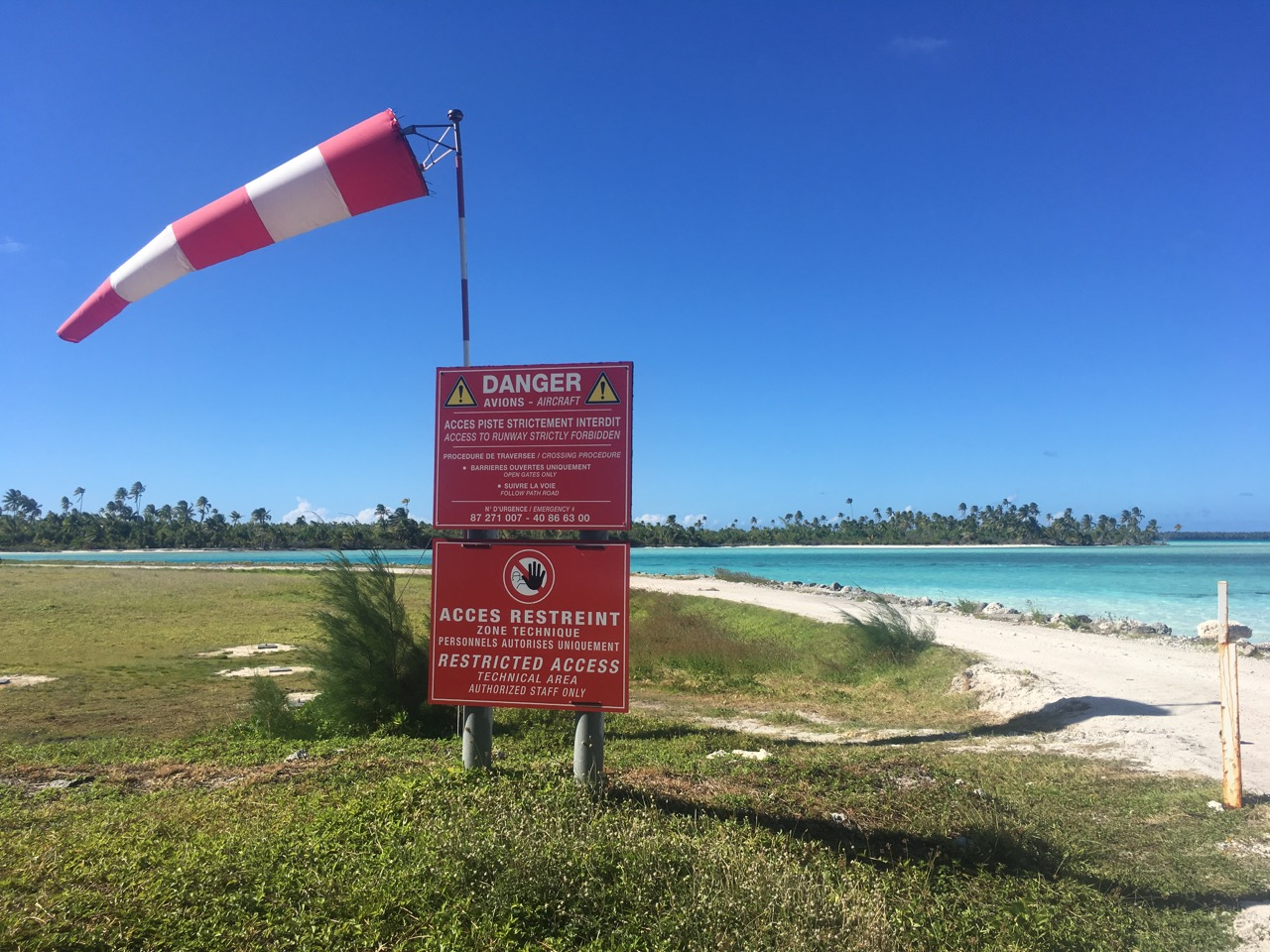
Tetiʻaroa Airport

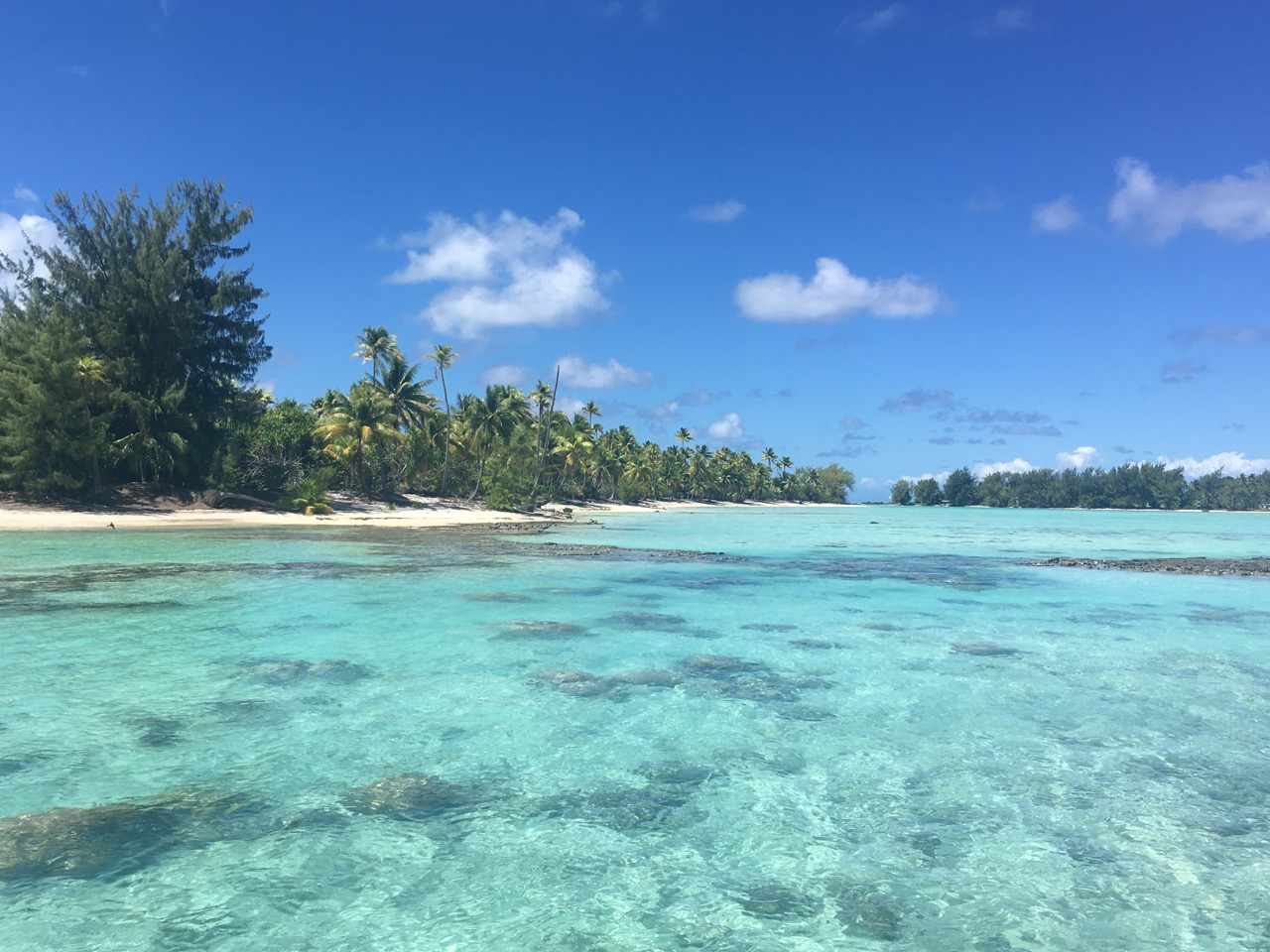
Islets of Tetiʻaroa

The atoll of Tetiʻaroa was a special place for the Tahitian chiefs, as a place to entertain themselves with song, dance, fishing and feasting. It was also a special place for the ariori to practice their custom of haʻaporiʻa. This custom included eating to gain weight, and staying out of the sun to whiten their skin. Plump and pale was a sign of "well-being and prosperity" for the ariori and chiefs. Tetiʻaroa was controlled by the chiefs of Pare-'Arue, and later, by members of the Pōmare Dynasty.

In 1789, William Bligh is said to have been the first European to visit the atoll while looking for early mutineers prior to the departure of HMS Bounty which eventually suffered a full mutiny. The United States Exploring Expedition visited the island on 10 September 1839.

=== Williams and Brando ===
In 1904, the royal family sold Tetiʻaroa to Johnston Walter Williams, a Canadian national and the only dentist in Tahiti. Williams later became Consul of the United Kingdom from 1916 to 1935. Williams managed Tetiʻaroa as a residence and a copra plantation.

In 1960, Marlon Brando "discovered" Tetiʻaroa while scouting filming locations for Mutiny on the Bounty, which was shot on Tahiti and neighbouring Mo'orea. After filming was completed, Brando hired a local fisherman to ferry him to Tetiʻaroa. It was "more gorgeous than anything I had anticipated," he marveled in his 1994 autobiography Songs My Mother Taught Me. Brando eventually purchased Tetiʻaroa's islets (motus) from one of Williams's direct descendants, Mrs. (Madame) Duran. Williams and his wife are buried on Motu Rimatuu. Brando decided on the purchase in 1966, having to endure political interference and local resistance to secure the atoll, reef and lagoon, all of which is now the property of French Polynesia. Many important archaeological sites have been located, identified, and studied on Tetiʻaroa. Thus, the historical significance of Tetiʻaroa to the people (and the government) of French Polynesia continues to make future development questionable at best.

Wanting to live on the atoll, Brando built a small village on Motu Onetahi in 1970. It consisted of an airstrip to arrive without breaching the reef, 12 simple bungalows, a kitchen hut, dining hall and bar, all built from local materials: coconut wood, thatch roofs and even large sea shells for sinks. The village became a place for friends, family and researchers studying the atoll's ecology and archaeology. Over the years, Brando spent as much time on the atoll as he could, and valued it as a getaway from his hectic life in Hollywood. Although, ultimately, he didn't spend as much time there as he'd wished to, it is said that he always cherished his moments on Tetiʻaroa. During his stays on the island, he was often visited by his children, grandchildren and great-grandchildren. Upon his death, Brando's son Teihotu lived on the island for some time. Eventually the village became a modest hotel managed by his Tahitian wife, Tarita Teriipaia, who had played his on-screen love in Mutiny on the Bounty. The hotel operated for more than 25 years, even after Brando had to leave French Polynesia to return to Los Angeles. Many hotel guests, arriving with higher expectations, lamented the lack of amenities normally found at an island "resort".

In 1980, the maxi yacht SY Condor of Bermuda ran aground on the Onetahi reef, which caused it to be shipwrecked and written off by insurers. Purportedly, Brando and the owner of the yacht engaged in a brief bidding-war over rights to the vessel's polished mahogany hull (as reported by the owner in the New Zealand yachting magazine Sail, in 1981), which Brando (allegedly) wanted to use as a bar at a new resort he planned to build on the island. The yacht was salvaged, and sent to New Zealand for repair. In 2002, two years before the actor's death, Brando signed a new will and trust agreement that left no instructions for Tetiʻaroa. Following his death in 2004, the TetiʻAroa Village Hotel was closed and the staff was evicted from the atoll. The atoll was closed to tourism. In August 2004, French Polynesian vice-president Hiro Tefaarerea advocated for the atoll to be declared a nature reserve to prevent development. Eventually, executors of the estate granted development rights to Pacific Beachcomber SC, a Tahitian company that owns hotels throughout French Polynesia. The Brando Resort was opened in July 2014.

== Flora and fauna ==
The island provides habitat for the following seabird species: Brown booby, red-footed booby, great crested tern, white tern, great frigatebird, lesser frigatebird, brown noddy, black noddy, sooty tern, and the grey-backed or spectacled tern. Shore and terrestrial birds include the Pacific reef egret, Pacific golden plover, wandering tattler, Pacific long-tailed cuckoo, and the bristle-thighed curlew.

Tetiʻaroa hosts five of the seven marine species of turtle, namely the Hawksbill turtle, green turtle, leatherback turtle, olive Ridley turtle, and loggerhead turtle.

Tetiʻaroa hosts numerous marine mammals, including the humpback whale, short-finned pilot whale, rough-toothed dolphin, spinner dolphin, Risso's dolphin, melon-headed whale, Blainville's beaked whale, Cuvier's beaked whale, and even some migrating pods of orca.

Numerous bony fishes, sharks, and rays are also present.

Plants include the fish-poison tree, Pacific ironwood, Alexandrian laurel, coconut palm, island walnut, dye fig, beach gardenia, beach heliotrope, lantern tree, breadfruit, lime tree, sea lettuce, and vanilla orchids, amongst others.

== Conservation and restoration ==
The presence of two invasive rat species significantly impacted the native vegetation, nesting seabird populations, sea turtle hatchlings, and land crabs. The Tetiʻaroa Society, Island Conservation, and the Brando Resort (among other partners) initiated an invasive rat-eradication project in the summer of 2022. After repeated pandemic-related disruptions, the operation took place over June and July 2022, covering 520 hectares of land and requiring more than 60 members of staff, plus volunteers. The hope is that this project will restore the terrestrial ecosystems, protect endangered native birds and turtles, and enhance the resilience of surrounding coral reefs, making them more resistant to climate change. Additional benefits may be ensuring food security for the local population, as well as eliminating reservoirs and vectors for human disease. In time, the atoll could become a translocation habitat for the Polynesian ground dove, the Blue Lorikeet, and the Tuamotu sandpiper. The next phase of the restoration program will be extensive research and monitoring, to record the subsequent benefits to the terrestrial and marine ecosystems.

== Airport ==
Tetiʻaroa Airport
- IATA: TTI; ICAO: NTTE

Summary
- Coordinates: 17°0′56″S 149°35′20″W

Map
- Location in French Polynesia

Runways
Direction	Length		Surface
Direction	m	ft	Surface
06/24	775	2,543

Tetiʻaroa Airport (IATA: TTI, ICAO: NTTE) is an airport on the atoll. The airport is served by Air Tetiaroa, a charter airline who primarily operate flights for guests of the Brando Resort to Faa'a International Airport. The airport currently has no scheduled commercial service.
