= Geography of the Pitcairn Islands =

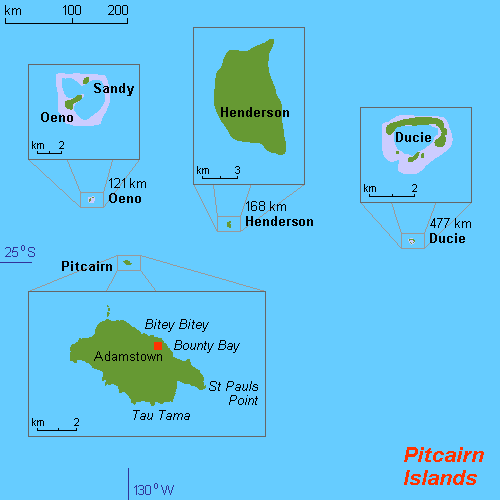
Map of Pitcairn Islands.

The Pitcairn Islands are a group of four islands in the south Pacific Ocean: the group comprises Pitcairn Island (a volcanic island), Henderson Island (an uplifted coral island), and two coral atolls, Oeno Island and Ducie Island.

The only inhabited island, Pitcairn, has an area of 5 km^{2} (1.9 sq mi) and a population density of 10/km^{2} (26/sq mi); it is only accessible by boat through Bounty Bay. The other islands are at a distance of more than 100 km (62 mi).

== Location ==
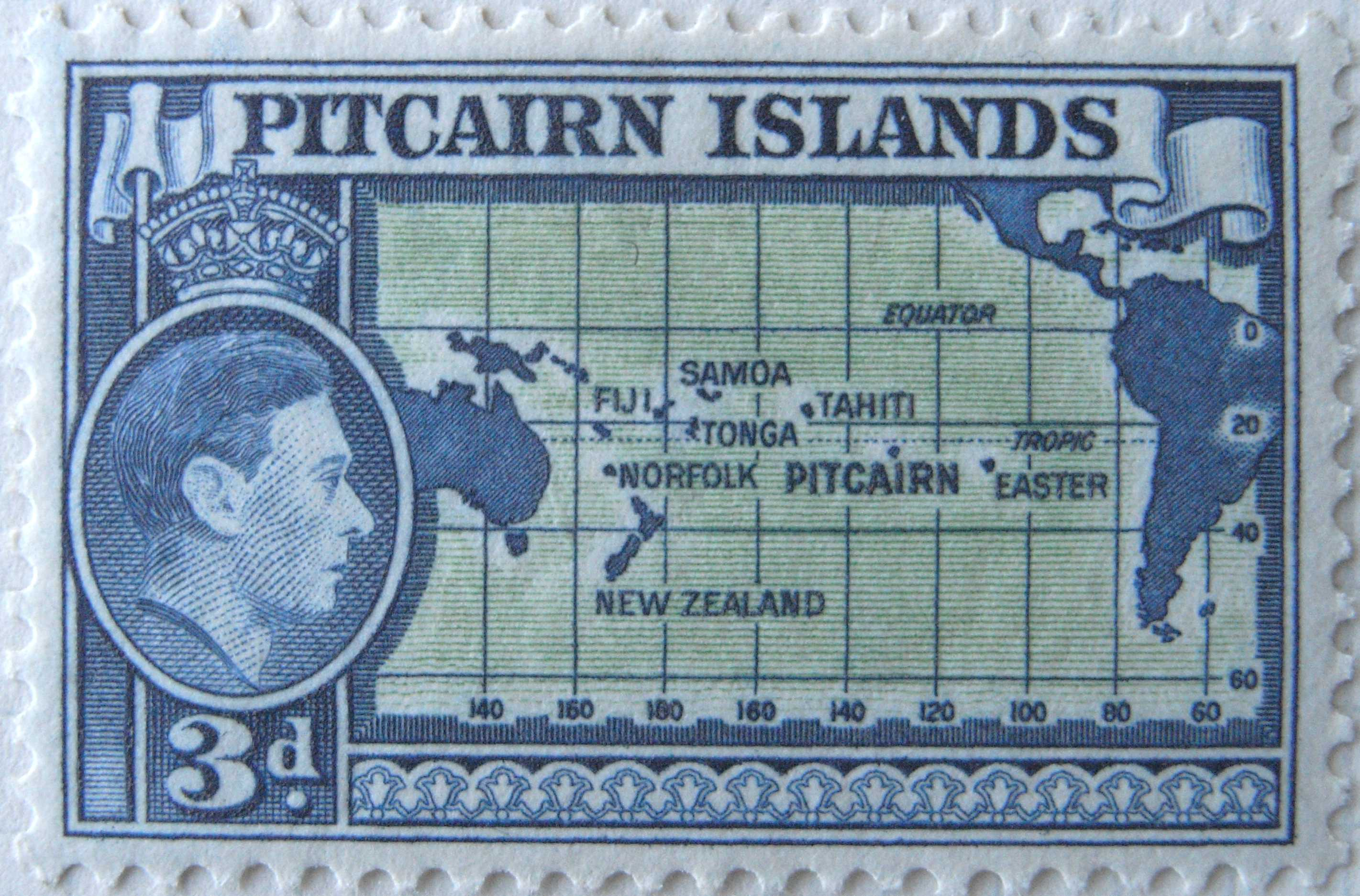
Pitcairn postage stamp, c.1940, with helpful map.

The Pitcairn Islands as a group of islands in Oceania:(25°04′00″S 130°05′00″W)

- Pitcairn Island (main island) (25°04′S 130°06′W)
- Henderson Island (24°22′01″S 128°18′57″W)
- Ducie Island (24°40′09″S 124°47′11″W)
- Oeno Island (23°55′26″S 130°44′03″W)

Situated in the South Pacific Ocean, about one-half of the way from Peru to New Zealand, they are one of the most remote sites of human habitation on Earth.

The only inhabited island, Pitcairn, is at 25.04 south, 130.06 west. Pitcairn is about 2,170 kilometres (1,350 mi) southeast of Tahiti, 5,310 kilometres (3,300 mi) from Auckland, New Zealand, and over 6,600 kilometres (4,100 mi) from Panama.

== Area ==
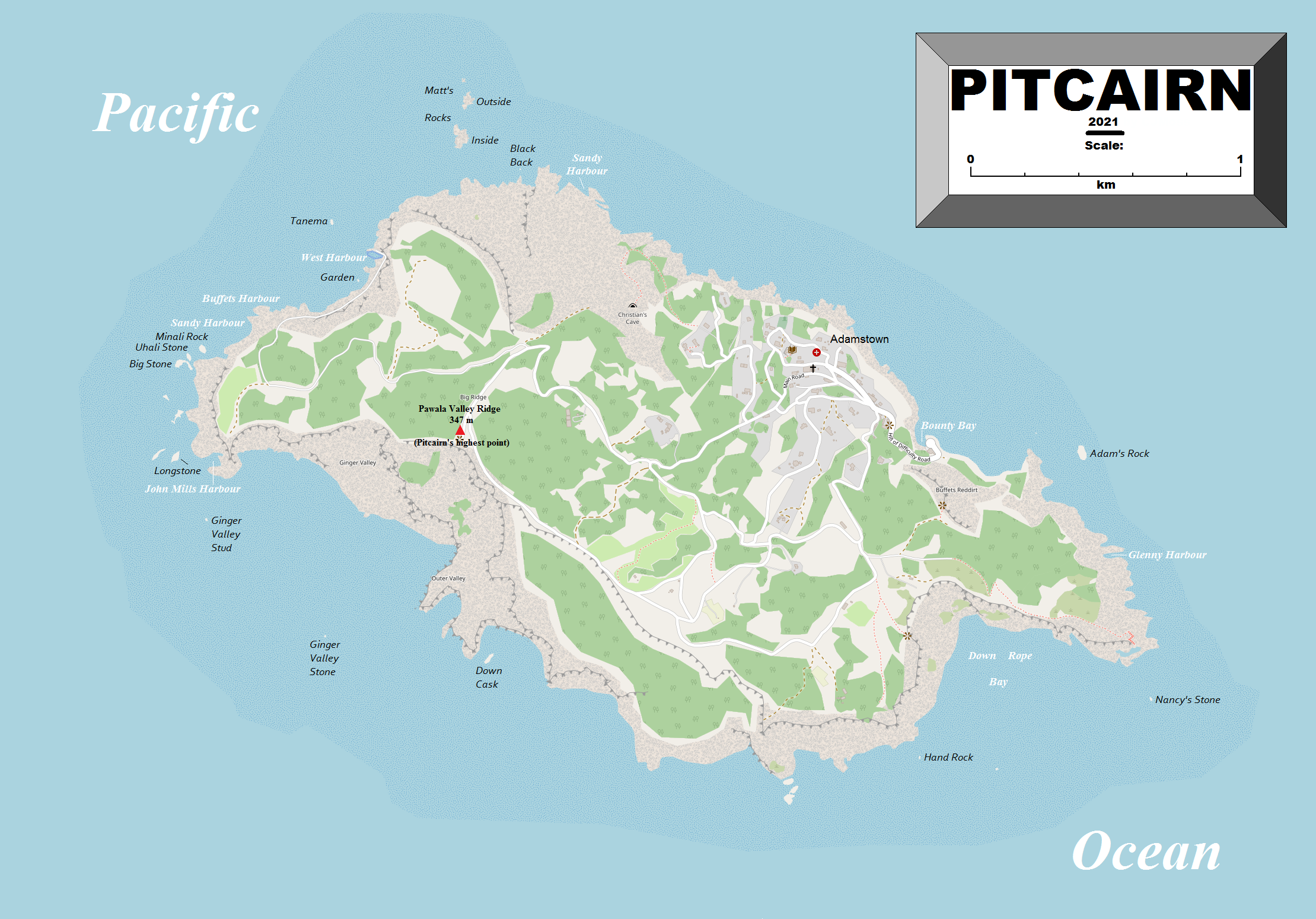
Enlargeable, detailed map of Pitcairn Island

Total: 47 km^{2} (18 sq mi)
Land: 47 km^{2} (18 sq mi)
Water: 0 km^{2} (0 sq mi)

Pitcairn Island is about 3.2 kilometres (2.0 mi) long and 1.6 kilometres (0.99 mi) wide. This is about 3/10 of the size of Washington, DC.

=== Land boundaries ===
0 km (0 mi)

=== Coastline ===
51 km (32 mi)

=== Maritime claims ===
Exclusive economic zone: 836,000 km^{2} (323,000 sq mi)
Territorial sea: 3 nautical miles (5.6 km; 3.5 mi)

== Climate ==
The Pitcairn Islands have a maritime tropical rainforest climate (Af according to the Köppen climate classification), with the climate being warm and humid year-round, with no dry season. The warmest month in Adamstown is February, with a mean of 23.8 °C (74.8 °F), while the coolest month is August, with a mean of 18.5 °C (65.3 °F). The highest temperature recorded was 33.3 °C (91.9 °F) during March. Because of its maritime location, the temperature has never dropped below 10 °C (50 °F). Adamstown receives 1,543 millimetres (60.7 in) of rainfall annually, with the rain being evenly distributed across the year. The climate of the Pitcairn Islands is modified by southeast trade winds.

Climate data for Pitcairn Island (1972-2004)
Month	Jan	Feb	Mar	Apr	May	Jun	Jul	Aug	Sep	Oct	Nov	Dec	Year
Record high °C (°F)	31.2 (88.2)	32.4 (90.3)	33.3 (91.9)	30.7 (87.3)	29.1 (84.4)	31.3 (88.3)	26.7 (80.1)	26.7 (80.1)	25.5 (77.9)	27.8 (82.0)	27.6 (81.7)	29.3 (84.7)	33.3 (91.9)
Mean daily maximum °C (°F)	25.7 (78.3)	26.2 (79.2)	26.1 (79.0)	24.6 (76.3)	22.9 (73.2)	21.7 (71.1)	20.8 (69.4)	20.6 (69.1)	21.0 (69.8)	21.8 (71.2)	22.9 (73.2)	24.2 (75.6)	23.2 (73.8)
Daily mean °C (°F)	23.3 (73.9)	23.8 (74.8)	23.8 (74.8)	22.5 (72.5)	20.9 (69.6)	19.7 (67.5)	18.8 (65.8)	18.5 (65.3)	18.8 (65.8)	19.6 (67.3)	20.7 (69.3)	22.0 (71.6)	21.0 (69.9)
Mean daily minimum °C (°F)	21.0 (69.8)	21.4 (70.5)	21.5 (70.7)	20.3 (68.5)	18.9 (66.0)	17.8 (64.0)	16.9 (62.4)	16.5 (61.7)	16.6 (61.9)	17.4 (63.3)	18.6 (65.5)	19.8 (67.6)	18.9 (66.0)
Record low °C (°F)	16.9 (62.4)	18.0 (64.4)	12.8 (55.0)	15.0 (59.0)	14.2 (57.6)	11.7 (53.1)	11.4 (52.5)	11.6 (52.9)	10.0 (50.0)	10.2 (50.4)	13.0 (55.4)	13.5 (56.3)	10.0 (50.0)
Average precipitation mm (inches)	96.5 (3.80)	132.7 (5.22)	107.8 (4.24)	114.8 (4.52)	111.9 (4.41)	152.8 (6.02)	139.0 (5.47)	131.6 (5.18)	134.5 (5.30)	143.0 (5.63)	120.4 (4.74)	157.7 (6.21)	1,542.7 (60.74)
Source 1: NOAA
Source 2: KNMI (precipitation)

== Terrain ==
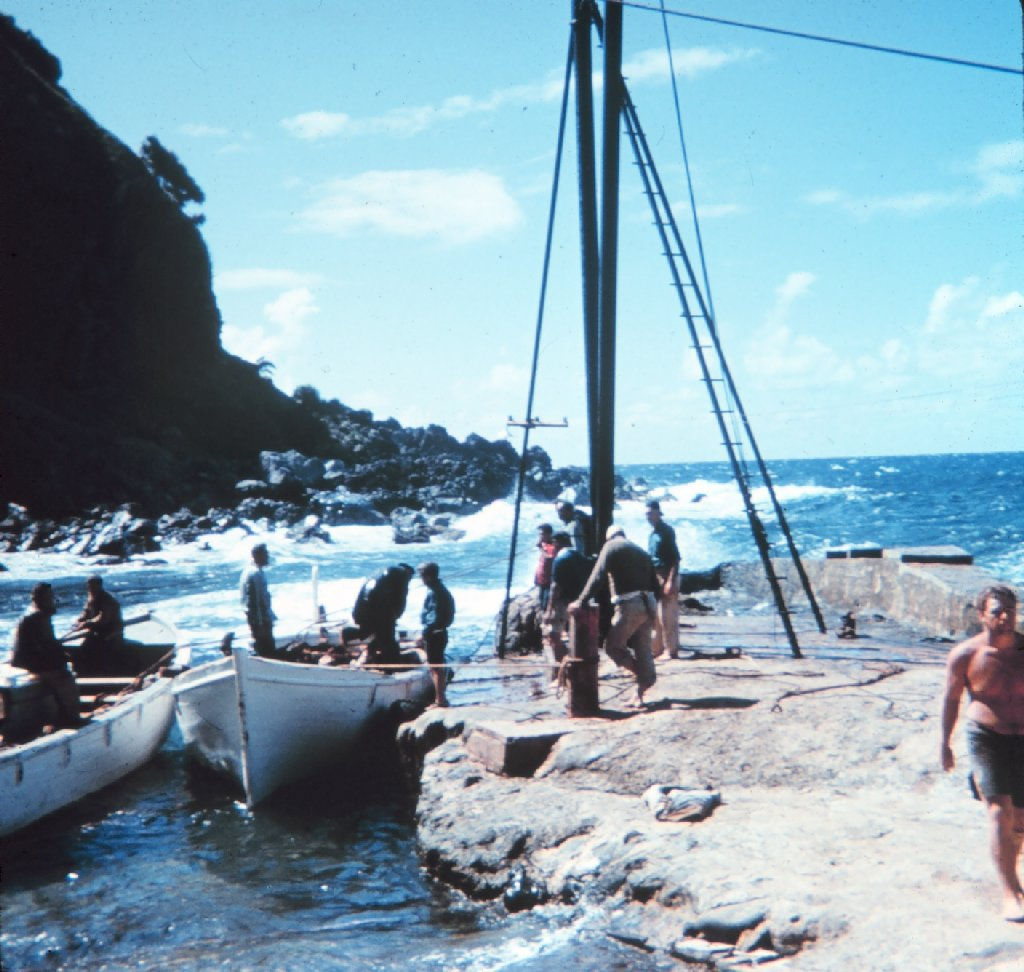
Geodesy Collection on Pitcairn Island

The Pitcairn Islands have a rugged terrain caused by volcanic formation, with a rocky coastline and cliffs.

=== Elevation extremes ===
Lowest point: Pacific Ocean coastline 0 m (sea level)
Highest point: Pawala Valley Ridge 347 m (1,138 ft)

== Natural resources ==
Miro trees (used for handicrafts), fish
Note: manganese, iron, copper, gold, silver, and zinc have been discovered offshore

== Natural hazards ==
Tropical Cyclones (especially November to May)

== Environment – current issues ==
Deforestation (only a small portion of the original forest remains because of burning and clearing for settlement)

== Maps ==
Worldwide map services show very little detail of the islands, and are even of limited use to show the location of them with respect to each other and to other islands, because they are so small and far apart. However, Mapquest zoom level 1 is a suitable map to see the location between Peru and New Zealand.

For the location with respect to French Polynesia, see the inset of Image:French Polynesia map.jpg.

== See also ==
- Nancy Stone
