= Pawala Valley Ridge =

Highest point of Pitcairn Island

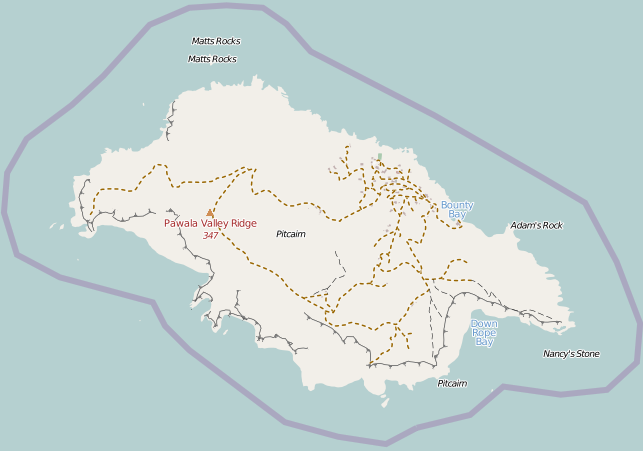
- Location within Pitcairn Island

Highest point
- Elevation: 347 m (1,138 ft)
- Prominence: 347 m (1,138 ft)
- Coordinates: 25°4′6″S 130°6′48″W

Geography
- Location: Pitcairn Island
- Topo map: Pawala Valley Ridge

Pawala Valley Ridge, is the highest point of the Pitcairn Islands, a British overseas territory in the southern Pacific Ocean, with an elevation of 347 metres (1,138 ft).

== See also ==
- Geography of the Pitcairn Islands
