= Nancy Stone =

Rock off the southeast coast of Pitcairn Island in the south Pacific

Coordinates: 25°04′37″S 130°05′17″W

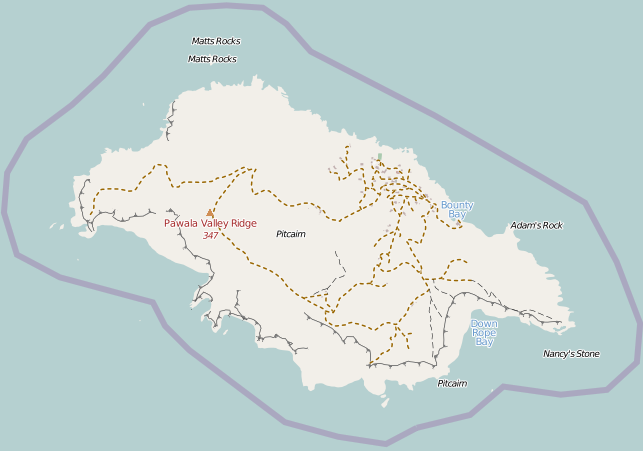
Location of Nancy Stone off the southeast coast of Pitcairn Island

Nancy Stone is a rock off the southeast coast of Pitcairn Island in the south Pacific. It is located off the coast between St Paul's Point and Down Rope. It is said to be "Named for the English name of Toofaiti, the consort of Tararo who was taken by mutineer John Williams, the act that initiated the massacre of most of the men of the island."
