= Down Rope =

Coordinates: 25°04′25″S 130°05′40″W

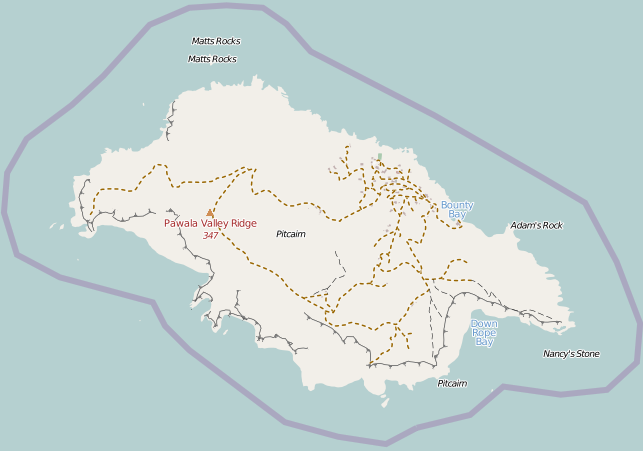
Location of Down Rope on Pitcairn Island

Down Rope is a coastal area on the southeast coast of Pitcairn Island in the south Pacific, to the east of the Aute Valley and north of Break Jim Hip, it lies on the eastern side of an inlet and contains large petroglyphs on the rock face, testament to the Polynesian settlers of centuries ago. It is described as "a steep cliff located on the southern coast south of Ned Young's Ground, and west of St Paul's Point. At its foot, despite its perilous descent, is a popular picnic area and Pitcairn's only beach." The descent from the cliff top is said to be "spine chilling". There is anchorage at Down Rope and ignimbrite is also found in the vicinity.
