= List of Norfolk Island records in athletics =

The following are the national records in athletics in Norfolk Island maintained by Norfolk Island's national athletics federation: Athletics Norfolk Island (ANI).

== Outdoor ==
Key to tables: Awaiting ratification Record not kept by ANI Not ratified or later rescinded ANI

=== Men ===
Event	Record	Athlete	Date	Meet	Place	Ref.
100 m	11.38	Jonathan McKee	20 August 1986		Gothenburg, Sweden	
100 m	11.2 h	Jonathan McKee	4 June 1985		Gothenburg, Sweden	
200 m	22.34	Jonathan McKee	19 July 1986		Halmstad, Sweden	
400 m	48.63	Jonathan McKee	4 July 1987		Varberg, Sweden	
800 m	1:58.0	Jonathan McKee	18 May 1986		Gothenburg, Sweden	
1500 m	4:28.05	Ben Wieczorek	13 July 2004	World Junior Championships	Grosseto, Italy	
3000 m	10:30.0	Graeme Donaldson	2 July 1988		Middlegate, Norfolk Island	
5000 m	17:41.3	Graeme Donaldson	7 April 1990		Middlegate, Norfolk Island	
10,000 m	38:42.1	Trevor Calder	7 November 1992		Middlegate, Norfolk Island	
Half marathon	1:16:31	Craig Rawlinson	7 June 1992		Norfolk Island	
Marathon	3:30:20	James Donaldson	28 July 2002	Commonwealth Games	Manchester, United Kingdom	
110 m hurdles	19.1 h	Robert Foote	2 December 1992		Middlegate, Norfolk Island	
400 m hurdles	1:24.43	Kenny Christopher	11 December 2001	South Pacific Mini Games	Middlegate, Norfolk Island	
3000 m steeplechase	11:32.2 h	Trevor Calder	12 February 1994		Middlegate, Norfolk Island	
3000 m steeplechase	10:20.85 #	Ben Wieczorek	13 July 2004	World Junior Championships	Grosseto, Italy	
High jump	1.83 m	Daniel Griffith	28 June 2012	Oceania Championships	Cairns, Australia	
Pole vault	1.60 m	Jayden Nicolai	24 November 1997		Middlegate, Norfolk Island	
Long jump	6.24 m	Aiden Butterfield	2 October 1996		Middlegate, Norfolk Island	
Triple jump	11.62 m	Ben Wieczorek	17 December 2004	Oceania Championships	Townsville, Queensland, Australia	
Shot put	13.67 m (Note: 13.68 by other sources)	Brentt Jones	10 January 1999		Middlegate, Norfolk Island	
Discus throw	37.60 m	Brentt Jones	15 March 1997		Middlegate, Norfolk Island	
Hammer throw	57.02 m	Brentt Jones	14 March 1998		Middlegate, Norfolk Island	
Javelin throw	52.44 m	Brentt Jones	23 December 1994		Middlegate, Norfolk Island	
Decathlon						
Decathlon	100m / Long jump / Shot put / High jump / 400m / 110m H / Discus / Pole vault / Javelin / 1500m					
5000 m walk (track)	29:54.0 h	Alan Kerr	31 January 1994		Middlegate, Norfolk Island	
20 km walk (road)						
50 km walk (road)						
4 × 100 m relay	45.51	Norfolk Island; Dylan Menzies; Graham; Blair Mogey; Wade Christian	12 December 2001	South Pacific Mini Games	Middlegate, Norfolk Island	
4 × 400 m relay						

=== Women ===
Event	Record	Athlete	Date	Meet	Place	Ref.
100 m	12.94	Zinta Flitten	February 1995		Auckland, New Zealand	
200 m	26.29	Zinta Flitten	22 March 1997		Hastings, United Kingdom	
400 m	1:02.54	April Quintal	1 September 1979	South Pacific Games	Suva, Fiji	
400 m	1:00.8 h	Virginia Christian-Bailey	7 May 1995		Tereora, Cook Islands	
800 m	2:26.0 h	Naomi Gillett	10 October 1992		Middlegate, Norfolk Island	
1000 m	3:23.6 h	Naomi Gillett	2 July 1988		Middlegate, Norfolk Island	
1500 m	5:00.01	Naomi Gillett	7 December 1988		Sydney, Australia	
2000 m	7:06.98	Naomi Gillett	7 December 1993		Port Vila, Vanuatu	
3000 m	10:26.80	Naomi Gillett	12 July 1990		Suva, Fiji	
5000 m	25:35.0+ h	Virginia Christian-Bailey	7 November 1992		Middlegate, Norfolk Island	
10,000 m	47:13.9 h	Virginia Christian-Bailey	7 November 1992		Middlegate, Norfolk Island	
Half marathon	2:12.16	Angela Keogh	15 October 1995		Burnt Pine, Norfolk Island	
Marathon						
100 m hurdles	18.00	Zinta Flitten	25 January 1997		Auckland, New Zealand	
400 m hurdles	1:14.88	Zinta Flitten	15 November 1997		Auckland, New Zealand	
3000 m steeplechase						
High jump	1.80 m	Dionne Gardner	30 March 1991		Christchurch, New Zealand	
Pole vault						
Long jump	4.80 m	Alice Donaldson	10 March 1995		Middlegate, Norfolk Island	
Triple jump	9.85 m (+1.3 m/s)	Jedda Fletcher	14 December 2002	Oceania Youth Championships	Christchurch, New Zealand	
Shot put	10.92 m	Zinta Flitten	January 1995		Auckland, New Zealand	
Discus throw	32.64 m	Cara Buffett	17 December 1994		Middlegate, Norfolk Island	
Hammer throw	44.20 m	Brianna Stephens	December 2013		Norfolk Island	
Javelin throw	35.92 m (new design)	Zinta Flitten	9 December 2000		Middlegate, Norfolk Island	
Javelin throw	46.26 m (old design)	Zinta Flitten	6 March 1998		Wanganui, New Zealand	
Heptathlon						
Heptathlon	100m H / High jump / Shot put / 200m / Long jump / Javelin / 800m					
3000 m walk (track)	17:08.0	Angela Keogh	30 October 1997		Middlegate, Norfolk Island	
5000 m walk (track)	28:19.0	Angela Keogh	16 March 1997		Middlegate, Norfolk Island	
10 km walk (road)	55:00	Angela Keogh	19 September 1998	Commonwealth Games	Kuala Lumpur, Malaysia	
20 km walk (road)	1:58:32	Angela Keogh	5 June 1999	South Pacific Games	Yigo, Guam	
4 × 100 m relay	54.7 h	Norfolk Island; Virginia Christian-Bailey; Alice Donaldson; Jody McCoy; Zinta Flitten	19 May 1995		Middlegate, Norfolk Island	
4 × 400 m relay						

== Indoor ==
=== Men ===
Event	Record	Athlete	Date	Meet	Place	Ref.
60 m	7.06	Jonathan McKee	6 February 1988		Karlstad, Sweden	
200 m	22.43	Jonathan McKee	6 February 1988		Karlstad, Sweden	
400 m	50.14	Jonathan McKee	9 December 1989		Gothenburg, Sweden	
800 m						
1500 m						
3000 m						
60 m hurdles						
High jump						
Pole vault						
Long jump						
Triple jump						
Shot put						
Heptathlon						
Heptathlon	60m / Long jump / Shot put / High jump / 60m H / Pole vault / 1000m					
5000 m walk						
4 × 400 m relay						

=== Women ===
Event	Record	Athlete	Date	Meet	Place	Ref.
60 m						
200 m						
400 m						
800 m						
1500 m						
3000 m						
60 m hurdles						
High jump						
Pole vault						
Long jump						
Triple jump						
Shot put						
Pentathlon						
Pentathlon	60m H / High jump / Shot put / Long jump / 800m					
3000 m walk						
4 × 400 m relay						
