= Athletics Norfolk Island =

Governing body for athletics in Norfolk Island

- Sport: Athletics
- Jurisdiction: Association
- Abbreviation: ANI
- Founded: 1993
- Affiliation: IAAF
- Affiliation date: 1995
- Regional affiliation: OAA
- Headquarters: Middlegate
- President: Brentt Jones
- Secretary: Geoff Gardner

Official website
- www.foxsportspulse.com/assoc_page.cgi?c=1-1157-0-0-0
- (Norfolk Island)

The Athletics Norfolk Island (ANI), also known as Norfolk Island Athletics Association, is the governing body for the sport of athletics in Norfolk Island. Current president is former hammer thrower Brentt Jones.

== History ==
ANI was founded in 1993 and was affiliated to the IAAF in 1995.

== Affiliations ==
ANI is the national member federation for the Norfolk Island in the following international organisations:

- International Association of Athletics Federations (IAAF)
- Oceania Athletic Association (OAA)

Moreover, it is part of the following national organisations:

- Norfolk Island Amateur Sports and Commonwealth Games Association

which is the body responsible for the Norfolk Island's representation at the Commonwealth Games.

== National records ==
ANI maintains the Norfolk Island records in athletics.

== See also ==
- Sport in Norfolk Island
