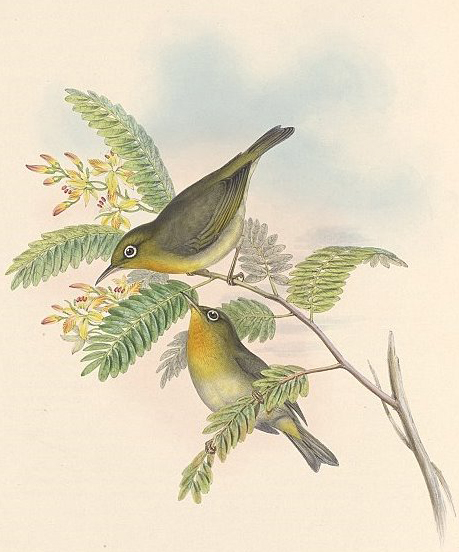
- Painting by John Gould (1848)
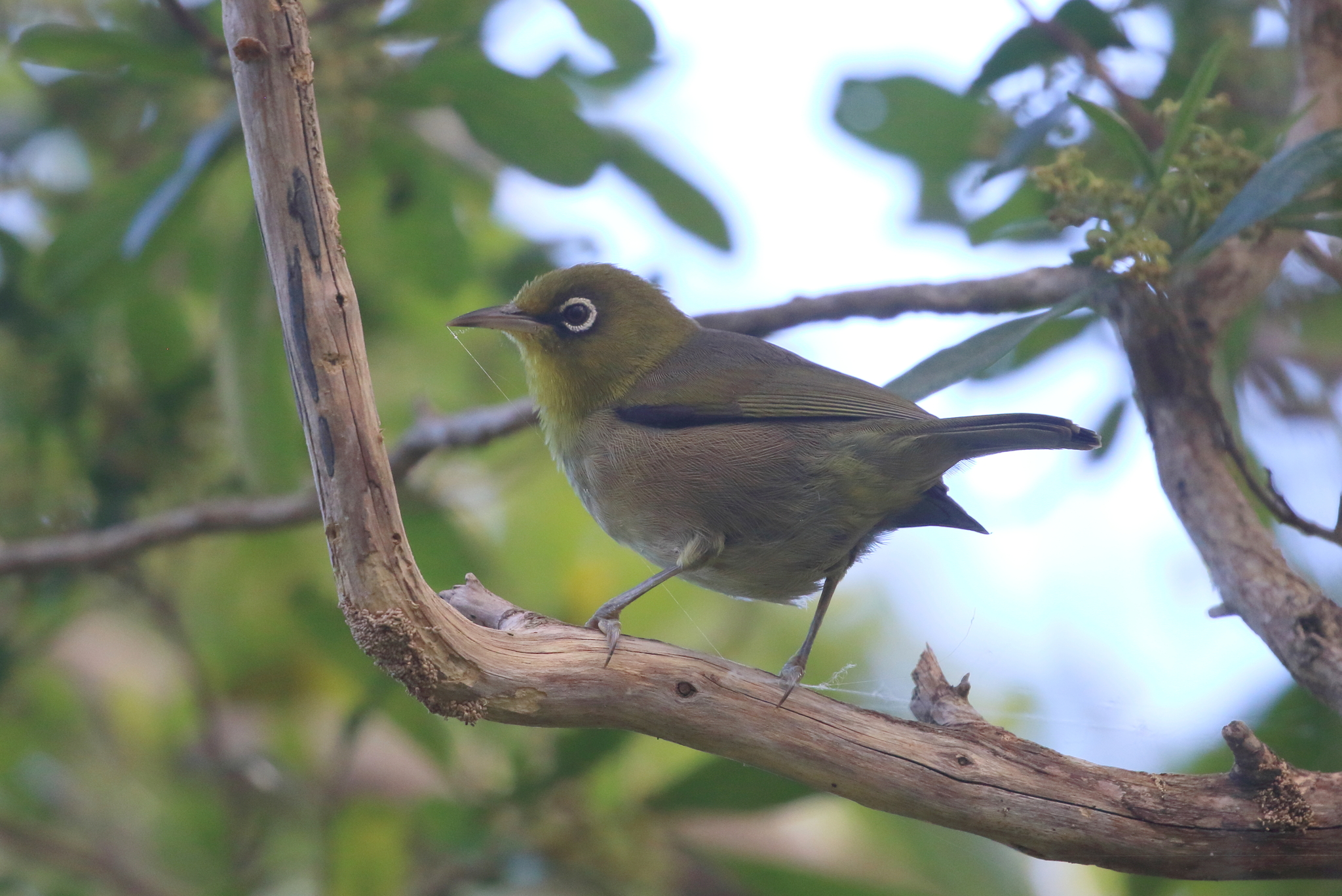

Conservation status
- Vulnerable (IUCN 3.1)

Scientific classification
- Kingdom: Animalia
- Phylum: Chordata
- Class: Aves
- Order: Passeriformes
- Family: Zosteropidae
- Genus: Zosterops
- Species: Z. tenuirostris

Binomial name
- Zosterops tenuirostris Gould, 1837
- Geographic range of the slender-billed white-eye

= Slender-billed white-eye =

Species of bird

The slender-billed white-eye (Zosterops tenuirostris) is a species of bird in the family Zosteropidae. It is endemic to Norfolk Island. It was first described by John Gould in 1833.

== Description ==
It is about 12–13 centimetres (4.7–5.1 in) long and weighs around 8–12 grams (0.28–0.42 oz), with a wingspan of around 16–18 centimetres (6.3–7.1 in). As its name suggests, it has a slenderer bill than its close relatives, indicating that it has evolved to better feed on nectar and insects.

Its plumage is mostly olive green on its upper parts and paler underneath, often yellowish-green or buff. Its eyes are encircled by a bright white ring of feathers. The legs and feet are usually greyish.

There is little sexual dimorphism: there is little difference in size and coloration between males and females.

== Behavior and feeding ==
Its natural habitat is subtropical moist lowland forests.

It is an omnivore, feeding on nectar, fruits and berries and insects. It feeds at all forest levels, but prefers the mid-level, where insects and nectar-rich flowers are most abundant. Its slender beak, slightly curved downward, makes it better able to grab insects and spiders from crevices and to obtain nectar from plants.

Individuals often forage in small groups, engage in grooming and warn each other of possible threats.

== Breeding ==
The breeding season is in spring and summer, September to January. The incubation period is around 12-14 days and usually produces two or three eggs. During this time, the male may protect the nest and feed the female.

Both parents engage in chick rearing. Chicks are altricial, i.e. born helpless, and are fed for two weeks before fledging. They remain with the parents for several weeks more before joining a flock.

== Preservation status ==
It is threatened by habitat loss and is rated by the International Union for Conservation of Nature as vulnerable.

Its predators include the Norfolk Island morepork, black rats and feral cats.
