= Athletics at the 2002 Commonwealth Games – Men's marathon =

Men's marathon at the Commonwealth Games

The men's marathon event at the 2002 Commonwealth Games was held on 28 July.

== Results ==
Rank	Name	Nationality	Time	Notes
1st place, gold medalist(s)	Francis Naali	Tanzania	2:11:58	
2nd place, silver medalist(s)	Joshua Chelanga	Kenya	2:12:44	
3rd place, bronze medalist(s)	Andrew Letherby	Australia	2:13:23	PB
4	Erick Wainaina	Kenya	2:13:27	
5	Luketz Swartbooi	Namibia	2:13:40	
6	Jonathan Wyatt	New Zealand	2:14:20	PB
7	Lee Troop	Australia	2:16:44	
8	Josiah Bembe	South Africa	2:18:16	SB
9	Shaun Creighton	Australia	2:18:19	
10	Dominic Bannister	England	2:19:31	
11	Pamenos Ballantyne	Saint Vincent and the Grenadines	2:19:36	
12	Stuart Hall	England	2:19:53	
13	Rodwell Kamwendo	Malawi	2:20:10	
14	Joseph Maqala	South Africa	2:21:03	
15	Paul Moqhali	Lesotho	2:23:10	
16	Simon Pride	Scotland	2:23:56	
17	Phil Costley	New Zealand	2:28:16	
18	Mpesela Ntlotsoeu	Lesotho	2:29:21	PB
19	James Donaldson	Norfolk Island	3:30:20	NR
	Lebohang Mahloane	Lesotho	DNF	
	Craig Kirkwood	New Zealand	DNF	
	Salaho Ngadi	Tanzania	DNF	
	Mark Hudspith	England	DNF	
	Ronnie Holassie	Trinidad and Tobago	DNS	
