= Zinta =

Zinta may refer to:

- Preity Zinta, an Indian actress
- Zinta (given name), a given name
