= Zinta Flitten =

Track and field athlete from Norfolk Island

Personal information
- National team: Norfolk Island
- Born: October 12, 1979 (age 47)

Sport
- Sport: Athletics
- Events: 100m, 200m, 100m hurdles, hammer, javelin

Zinta Flitten (born 12 October 1979) is a track and field athlete from Norfolk Island.

Flitten has held the national record for Norfolk Island for the 100 metres (1995–2017) and 200 metres (1997–2007). Both records were beaten by Tayanita Robertson in 2017 at the Oceania Athletics Area Championships in Suva, Fiji. Flitten achieved her personal best in 100 metres with 12.94 (1995, Auckland) and 200 metres with 26.29 (1997, Hastings).

Flitten also holds the record for Norfolk Island in javelin throw and shot put. She achieved her personal best in shot put with 10.92 (1995, Auckland). In 2000, in Middlegate, she broke her own personal best for javelin with 35.42, continuing to hold the record for Norfolk Island. In 1998, she competed in the Australian Junior Women's Track & Field Championships, placing eight in the javelin.

On 19 May 1995, she set the Norfolk Island record for the 4×100 metres relay, competing with Virginia Christian-Bailey, Alice Donaldson, and Jody McCoy, in Middlegate, with a time of 54.7.

In 1997, she achieved her personal best in 100 metres hurdles with 18.00 (Auckland, North Shore) and in 1998 set personal best in hammer throw with 18.06 (Auckland).
