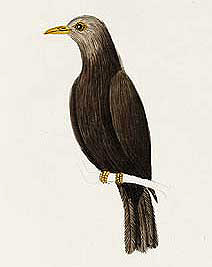
- Norfolk Island thrush

Conservation status
- Extinct

Scientific classification
- Kingdom: Animalia
- Phylum: Chordata
- Class: Aves
- Order: Passeriformes
- Family: Turdidae
- Genus: Turdus
- Species: T. poliocephalus
- Subspecies: T. p. poliocephalus

Trinomial name
- Turdus poliocephalus poliocephalus (Latham, 1801)

= Norfolk thrush =

Extinct subspecies of bird

The Norfolk thrush (Turdus poliocephalus poliocephalus), also known as the grey-headed blackbird or guava bird, is an extinct bird in the thrush family endemic to Norfolk Island, an Australian territory in the Tasman Sea. It is the extinct nominate subspecies of the Tasman Sea island thrush (Turdus poliocephalus).

== Description ==
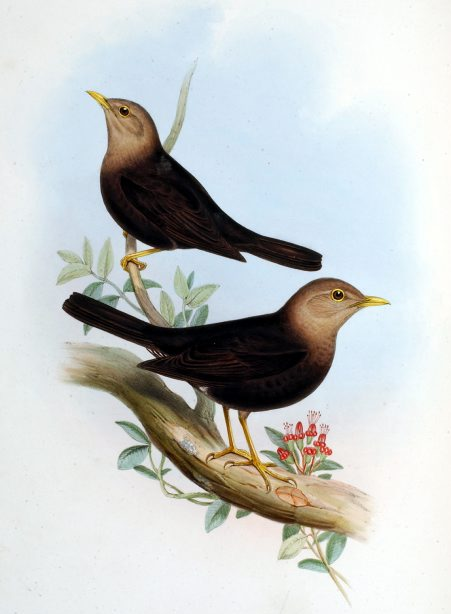
Pair by John Gould

The Norfolk thrush was mainly dark brown in colour, with a pale grey-brown head and upper breast. It was about 21 cm in length, with a wingspan of 34 cm and a weight of 55 g. It had a yellow bill, orbital ring and legs. Males and females were similar in size and appearance.

== Habitat ==
The Norfolk thrush used to be common in forest and was often seen in gardens adjacent to rainforest remnants.

== Behaviour ==
=== Breeding ===
The subspecies nested in trees, including the introduced lemon tree. The clutch size was 2–4.

=== Feeding ===
The Norfolk thrush foraged mainly on the ground, in leaf litter, for small invertebrates, seeds and fallen fruit.

== Status and conservation ==
The subspecies became extinct around the late 1970s, with the last confirmed record in 1975. The cause of its extinction is attributed to a combination of clearing of native vegetation and predation by rats and feral cats. Additional factors were competition with introduced song thrushes and common blackbirds, as well as by interbreeding with the latter species producing sterile offspring.
