= Two Chimneys Wines =

Coordinates: 29°02′01″S 167°59′08″E

Two Chimneys Wines is the first and only winery in Norfolk Island. Established by Rod and Noelene McAlpine in 2006, it has a homestead, a tasting room with wood fire and wide, covered verandas, and a vineyard with eight varieties of grape. Its first vines were planted in 2003.

== See also ==
- Australian wine
