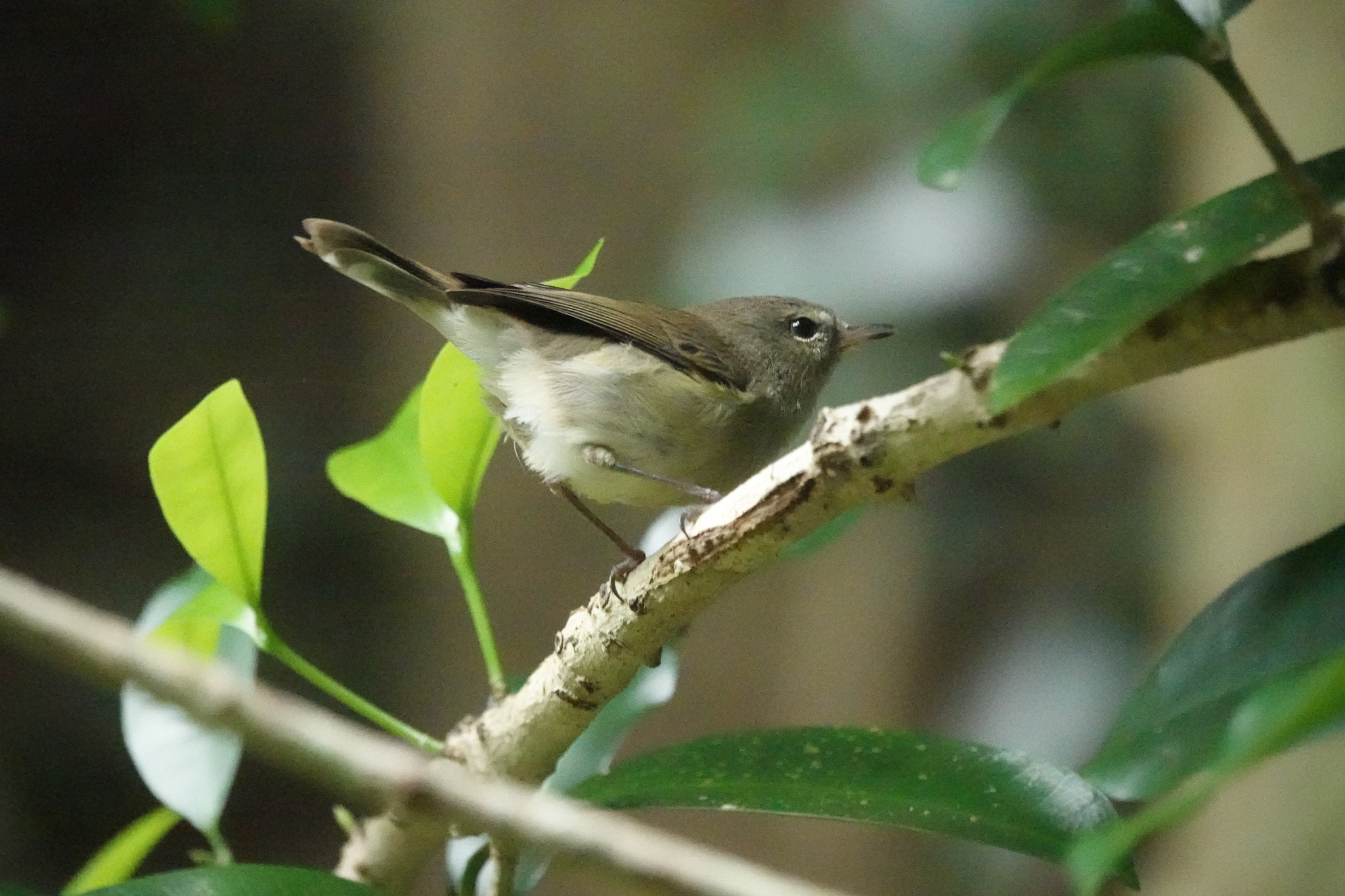

Conservation status
- Least Concern (IUCN 3.1)

Scientific classification
- Kingdom: Animalia
- Phylum: Chordata
- Class: Aves
- Order: Passeriformes
- Family: Acanthizidae
- Genus: Gerygone
- Species: G. modesta

Binomial name
- Gerygone modesta Pelzeln, 1860

= Norfolk gerygone =

Species of bird

The Norfolk gerygone (Gerygone modesta) is a species of bird in the Australian warbler family Acanthizidae. It is endemic to Norfolk Island. This species was once lumped with the grey gerygone of New Zealand and the extinct Lord Howe gerygone as a single species. Genetic studies have shown that the grey and Norfolk gerygones are sister species, and they are still treated as a single species by some authorities.

The Norfolk gerygone is a small bird, measuring 9.5 to 12.3 cm (3.7–4.8 in) in length and weighing around 9 g (0.32 oz). It has an olive-brown head, grey face and a greyish throat turning whitish as it reaches the breast and underparts. Its eyes are red to red-brown, and the bill, which is larger than that of the related grey gerygone, is black. The sexes are alike, and young birds look much like adults with yellow wash on the face and underparts, a duller eye and a lighter bill.

Its natural habitats are subtropical moist lowland forests, gardens and pastureland, where it feeds on insects. It usually hunts in the canopy of trees, where prey is caught on the wing or gleaned from leaves and branches. Norfolk gerygones breed during the summer, from November to February.

The Norfolk gerygone is not threatened with extinction. The species was previously listed as Vulnerable by the IUCN, but studies have shown that the population was stable and the species was downlisted to Least Concern in 2012. It is the most common native species on Norfolk Island, with an estimated population of around 10,000 mature birds, and has adapted well to human modified habitats. Scientists have suggested that the species be introduced to Lord Howe Island, which would establish an insurance population of this species and fill the niche left by the extinct Lord Howe gerygone.
