= Zinta (given name) =

Female given name

- Gender: Female
- Name day: April 6

Origin
- Origin: From zinte, "magic"
- Region of origin: Latvia

Other names
- Related names: Zintis

Zinta is a Latvian feminine given name. The name day of persons named Zinta is April 6.

== Notable people ==
- Zinta Valda Ziemelis (1937–2014), birth name of American actress Cynthia Lynn
- Zinta Flitten (b. 1979), Norfolk Island track and field athlete
