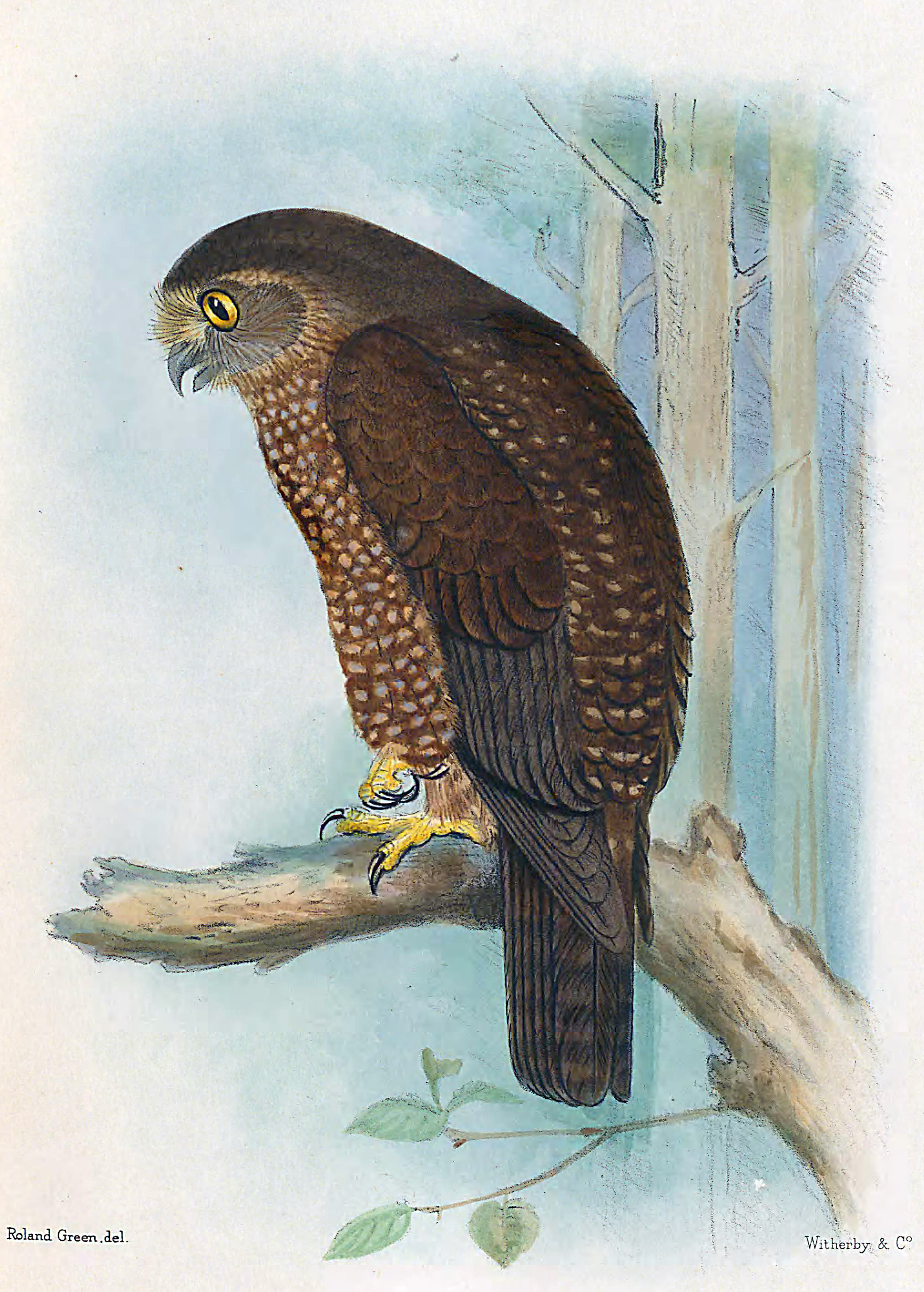
- Illustration by Henrik Grönvold

Conservation status
- Endangered (EPBC Act)

Scientific classification
- Kingdom: Animalia
- Phylum: Chordata
- Class: Aves
- Order: Strigiformes
- Family: Strigidae
- Genus: Ninox
- Species: N. novaeseelandiae
- Subspecies: N. n. undulata

Trinomial name
- Ninox novaeseelandiae undulata (Latham, 1801)

= Norfolk boobook =

Subspecies of bird

The Norfolk boobook (Ninox novaeseelandiae undulata), also known as the Norfolk Island boobook, Norfolk Island owl or Norfolk Island morepork, is a bird in the true owl family endemic to Norfolk Island, an Australian territory in the Tasman Sea between Australia and New Zealand. It was a subspecies of the morepork (Ninox novaeseelandiae). While the bird is technically extinct, its genes live on in the descendants of the hybrid offspring of the last female bird, which was sighted for the last time in 1996. Due to the genetic closeness of the Norfolk and New Zealand moreporks, with the majority of original Norfolk boobook DNA being preserved in living hybrids, the subspecies is thus considered extant by the International Ornithological Congress and the EPBC Act despite the hybridization.

== Description ==
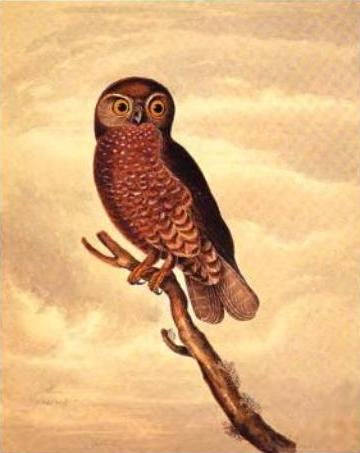
Watercolour by James Stuart, 1839

The Norfolk boobook was very similar in appearance to the New Zealand and Tasmanian boobooks, being a small brown hawk owl with mottled plumage. It was smaller, darker and more reddish in colouring than the Tasmanian boobook, with much spotting. However, it was slightly larger than the nominate subspecies from New Zealand; female boobooks were larger than the males, with New Zealand females comparable in size to Norfolk Island males, a factor which gave rise to sexing difficulties with hybrid birds in the conservation management program.

== Habitat ==
The bird inhabited the island's subtropical rainforest, which was largely cleared in the 19th century following human settlement. Most of the remaining forest lies within the small (4.65 km²) Mt Pitt section of the Norfolk Island National Park.

== Behaviour ==
=== Breeding ===
Boobooks bred in tree hollows. Recorded clutch sizes from Norfolk Island ranged from one to three eggs, with two being usual.

=== Feeding ===
Boobooks fed on small vertebrates, especially birds and mammals, as well as invertebrates.

== Status and conservation ==
The population of the Norfolk boobook declined with the clearance and modification of its forest habitat, especially the felling of large trees with suitable hollows for nesting in. There was also competition for nest hollows with feral honey bees and introduced crimson rosellas. By 1986 the population had been reduced to a single female bird, named "Miamiti" after a matriarch of the Norfolk Island people. As part of a program to attempt to conserve at least some of the genes of the insular subspecies, two male moreporks of the nominate New Zealand subspecies, Ninox novaeseelandiae novaeseelandiae, were introduced to the island as mates for the female. The males were sourced from the New Zealand subspecies rather than one of the Australian subspecies as it was discovered that it was more closely related to the Norfolk Island taxon. Nest boxes were also provided. One of the introduced males disappeared a year after introduction but the other successfully mated with the female with the pair producing fledged chicks in 1989 and 1990. The original female disappeared in 1996, rendering the subspecies extinct, but, by then, there was a small hybrid population of about a dozen birds. These birds and their descendants continue to exist on the island. By 2018, between 45-50 birds were known, although the population has been inbred and aging with no new recruitment since 2012.

The New Zealand Moreporks and Norfolk island boobooks are considered to be very closely related, with some debate over whether it should even be recognized as a separate taxon; they can only be distinguished by their physical features. For this reason, the International Ornithological Congress does not consider this subspecies to be extinct as the hybrids are so similar to the pure birds, despite it no longer surviving as a genetically pure lineage. Genetic analysis indicates that half the nuclear genome and all the mtDNA of the original Norfolk boobook persists in the modern birds, marking it a special case of a taxon that can still be considered extant in a hybrid form. This may be due to the last surviving pure bird being a female, allowing for the mtDNA to be fully passed on.

=== Differences between hybrids and pure birds ===
The hybrid owls are not identical to the original ones. They are more similar in appearance to the New Zealand moreporks than to the Norfolk Island ones. The hybrids also repeat their calls more rapidly than the original birds.
