= Burnt Pine =

- Town
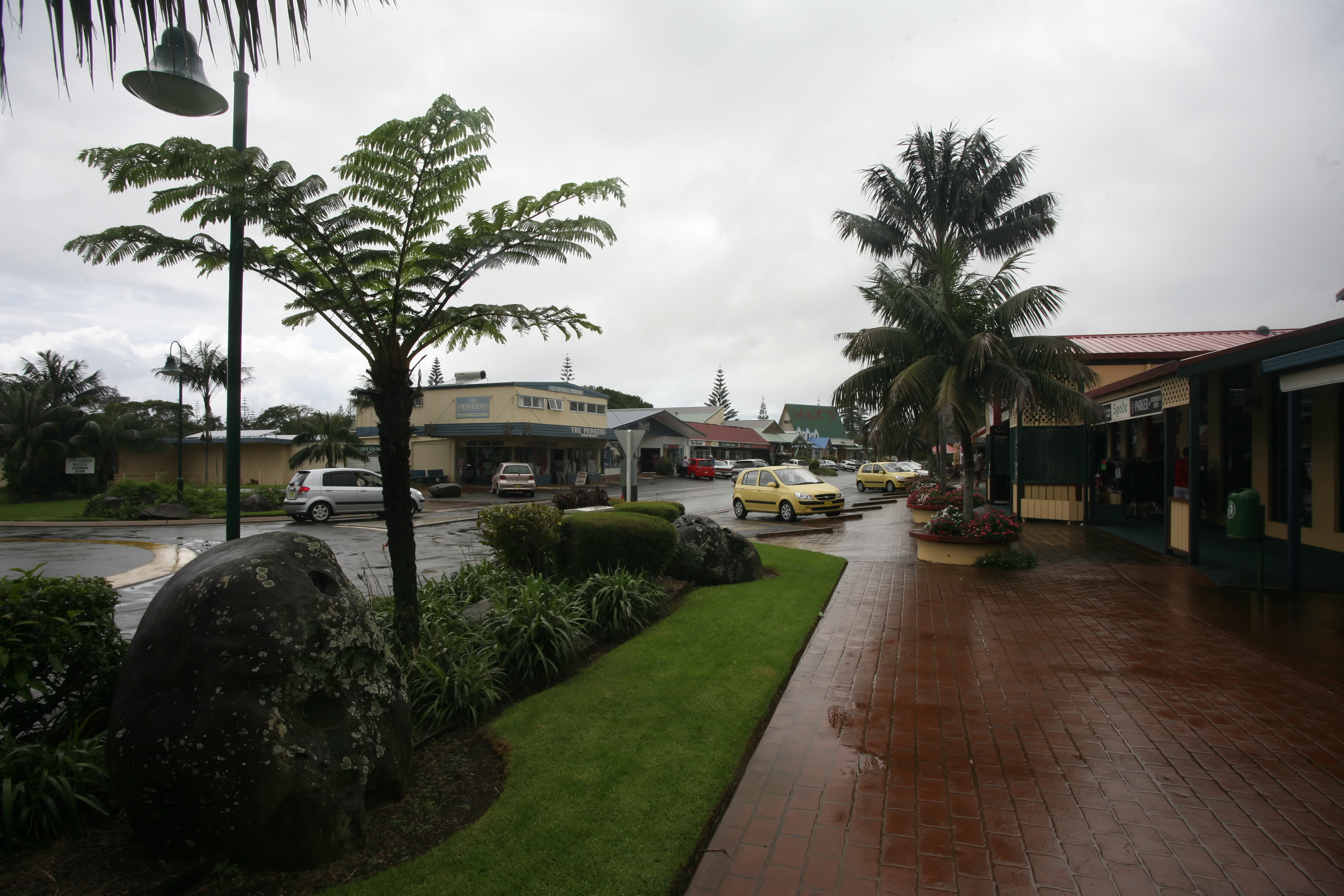
- Burnt Pine in 2011

- Coordinates: 29°2′S 167°57′E
- Country: Australia
- State: Norfolk Island
- Location: 3 km (1.9 mi) NW of Kingston

Government
  - Federal division: Bean

Population
  - Total: 180 (2007)
- Time zone: UTC+11 (NFT)
- Postcode: 2899

Burnt Pine (Norf'k: Ban Pain) is the largest town on Norfolk Island, an Australian external territory located in the Pacific Ocean between New Caledonia and New Zealand. It is the main commercial hub of the island, and travel from one side of the island to another generally involves passing through Burnt Pine as the island's sole thoroughfare runs through the town's centre.

== Geography ==
The town is located on a roughly east–west-aligned ridge of volcanic soils, about 100 metres (330 feet) above sea level. The headwaters of Cascade Creek and Broken Bridge Creek (northern side) and Watermill Creek (southern side) flow from just below the ridge. It sits in approximately the middle of the island. The entire island has a maritime-influenced humid subtropical climate (Köppen: Cfa) with warm, humid summers and very mild, rainy winters.

== History ==
British colonization of nearby Australia began when the First Fleet arrived in 1788, with Norfolk Island as part of the plan for the penal colonies. In 1795, First Fleeter Andrew Goodwin was granted a prime 60-acre (24 ha) lot (lot 64) on Middlegate and Queen Elizabeth Roads Norfolk Island, where he lived with his wife Lydia (Letitia) Munro and his children until 1802. A map of 1844 labels the area 'Sheep Station', and a 1904 map shows the area as large rural holdings. The impetus for founding the town came in 1942 during the Pacific War, when construction of a military aerodrome began (now the Norfolk Island Airport). This involved the destruction of the convict-planted Pine Avenue for the east–west runway. Between 1943 and 1944, the Army produced the Burnt Pine News, the first eponymous use of the place name.

By the end of the Second World War, a number of shops and a new hospital had been built around the intersection of Taylors Road and Grassy Road (the original location of the name Burnt Pine), and in 1946, Rawson Hall was built in Taylors Road. Regular commercial air services from 1946 onwards brought a gradual increase in tourism, and Burnt Pine was well placed on the airport edge for siting new guest houses and shops, such as Holloway's 'Sample Rooms', a tea shop that operated on a rise in Taylors Road known as Holloways Hill. A new hospital was built in 1952 on the Grassy Road corner. The expansion of the town matched the growth of the tourism industry. Development spread eastwards along Taylors Road: Prentice's duty-free shop opened on Taylors Road in 1953, as did the 'Leeside' store near the New Cascade Road corner. The tourist boom started in the mid-1960s, and as the town spread, the name Burnt Pine followed and now refers to the whole urbanised area.

== Urban layout ==
The town has a ribbon development form strung along Taylors Road, with its boundaries marked by cattle grids on Taylors Road, New Cascade Road, Grassy Road, Douglas Drive and Ferny Lane. Central Taylors Road around the intersection with New Cascade Road forms the town's High Street or CBD and contains its major infrastructure. Shops, cafes, offices, service clubs, several tourist resort complexes and a few residential properties line both sides of the street. The Bicentennial Complex on Taylors Road contains the main public buildings (Visitor Centre, Post Office, Customs & Immigration Offices and Liquor Bond Store), Rawson Hall and the Lions Park sports grounds and oval. Other public buildings are the Norfolk Island Hospital on Grassy Road and the Norfolk Telecom Offices on New Cascade Road. There are no real side streets or blocks below the ridge. Taylors Road merges into Douglas Drive and the Norfolk Island Airport marking the western edge of the town. The town's buildings mainly date from the 1970s and 1980s and are mainly single storied, sitting low in the landscape.

== Population ==
Census population figures are not available for the various districts of Norfolk Island. The population of Burnt Pine was estimated to be 180 in 2007.

== Municipal governance ==
There is no level of municipal governance in Norfolk Island, and the town has no formal boundaries. The Chamber of Commerce provides an avenue for involvement by business people in lobbying the Territory government for improved facilities and maintenance of public spaces. The town has no distinctive emblems or heraldry.

== Nearby towns and hamlets ==
Kingston, the capital of Norfolk Island and main landing place, is about 3 kilometres (1.9 miles) to the south. Middlegate, the site of Norfolk Island Central School, is a hamlet on the eastern fringe of Burnt Pine. Middlegate's main street is Queen Elizabeth Avenue, running from Taylors Road to the Middlegate Crossroads. The school is located at the crossroads, as is the Bounty Folk Museum, formerly Uncle Joe Jenkins General Store. Several tourist resorts have a Queen Elizabeth Avenue address whereas the main public space is the Queen Victoria Gardens. Cascade, the secondary landing place, with no buildings other than a pier and weighbridge and the ruins of an old whaling station, is about 2 kilometres (1.2 miles) to the north of the town.

== Notable sites in Burnt Pine and Middlegate ==
Burnt Pine

- Norfolk Island Bowling Club 1939
- Rawson Hall 1946
- South Pacific Hotel
- Lions Park sports grounds and grandstand 1974
- The Bicentennial Complex 1988
- Bounty Square and ship monument 2000

Middlegate

- Bounty Folk Museum 1980
- Governor's Lodge Resort 1998
- Fletcher's Mutiny Cyclorama 2002
- Queen Victoria Gardens 2009
