= Norfolk Island =

External territory of Australia

- External territory
- Territory of Norfolk Island; Teratri a' Norf'k Ailen (Pitcairn-Norfolk)
- Flag Coat of arms
- Motto: "Inasmuch"
- Anthem: "God Save the King" (Note: Norfolk Island does not recognise the Australian anthem, Advance Australia Fair unlike other Australian territories, reflecting its unique heritage as a home for the HMS Bounty mutineers)
- Official territorial song: "Come Ye Blessed"
- Location of Norfolk Island
- Sovereign state: Australia
- Separation from Tasmania: 1 November 1856
- Transfer to Australia: 1 July 1914
- Establishment of Self-government: 10 August 1979
- Abolition of Self-government: 18 June 2015
- Named after: Mary Howard, Duchess of Norfolk
- Capital: Kingston; 29.056°S 167.961°E
- Largest town: Burnt Pine
- Official languages: English; Norfuk
- Ethnic groups (2021): Norfolk Islanders English Pitcairn Islander New Zealanders Scottish Irish Fijians
- Religion (2021): Christianity (56.0%); Irreligion (35.7%); Hinduism (0.2%); Buddhism (0.1%)
- Demonym(s): Norfolk Islander
- Government: Directly administered dependency
  - Monarch: Charles III
  - Governor-General: Sam Mostyn
  - Prime Minister of Australia: Anthony Albanese
  - Minister for Territories: Kristy McBain
  - Administrator: Fiona McKergow

Parliament of Australia
  - Senate: represented by ACT senators (since 2016)
  - House of Representatives: included in the Division of Bean (since 2018)

Area
  - Total: 34.6 km^{2} (13.4 sq mi)
  - Water (%): negligible
- Highest elevation: 319 m (1,047 ft)

Population
  - 2021 census: 2,188 (not ranked)
  - Density: 61.9/km^{2} (160.3/sq mi) (not ranked)
- GDP (nominal): 2016 estimate
  - Total: US$60,209,320
- Currency: Australian dollar (AU$) (AUD)
- Time zone: UTC+11:00 (NFT)
  - Summer (DST): UTC+12:00 (NFDT)
- Driving side: Left
- Calling code: +672
- Postcode: NSW 2899
- ISO 3166 code: NF
- Internet TLD: .nf

Norfolk Island (/ˈnɔːr.fək/, NOR-fək or locally /ˈnɔːr.foʊk/, NOR-fohk; Norf'k Ailen) is an external territory of Australia located in the Pacific Ocean between New Zealand and New Caledonia, 1,412 kilometres (877 mi) directly east of Australia's Evans Head and about 900 kilometres (560 mi) from Lord Howe Island. Together with the neighbouring Phillip Island and Nepean Island, the three islands collectively form the Territory of Norfolk Island. At the 2021 census, it had 2,188 inhabitants living on a total area of about 35 km^{2} (14 sq mi). Its capital is Kingston.

Norfolk Island is the main island in a group comprising the Australian external territory of Norfolk Island, situated in the Pacific Ocean between Australia and New Zealand approximately 692 km (430 mi) south of New Caledonia.

East Polynesians were the first to settle Norfolk Island, but they had already departed when Great Britain settled it as part of its 1788 colonisation of Australia. The island served as a convict penal settlement from 6 March 1788 until 5 May 1855, except for an 11-year hiatus between 15 February 1814 and 6 June 1825, when it lay abandoned. On 8 June 1856, permanent civilian residence on the island began when descendants of the Bounty mutineers were relocated from Pitcairn Island. The island was formally transferred from the United Kingdom to Australia in 1914.

Native to the island, the evergreen Norfolk Island pine is a symbol of the island and is pictured on its flag. The pine is a key export for Norfolk Island, being a popular ornamental tree in Australia (where two related species grow), and also worldwide.

== History ==
=== Early settlement ===
Norfolk Island was uninhabited when first settled by Europeans, but evidence of earlier habitation was obvious. Archaeological investigation suggests that in the 13th or 14th century the island was settled by East Polynesian seafarers, either from the Kermadec Islands north of mainland New Zealand, or from the North Island of New Zealand. Both Polynesian and Melanesian artefacts have been found, so it is possible that people from New Caledonia, relatively close to the north, also reached Norfolk Island. Human occupation must have ceased at least a few hundred years before Europeans arrived in the late 18th century. Ultimately, the relative isolation of the island, and its poor horticultural environment, were not favourable to long-term settlement.

=== First penal settlement (1774–1814) ===
The first European known to have sighted and landed on the island, Captain James Cook, arrived on 10 October 1774, in the course of his second voyage to the South Pacific on HMS Resolution. He named it after Mary Howard, Duchess of Norfolk. John Call argued the advantages of Norfolk Island in that it was uninhabited and that New Zealand flax (seen as a potential source of materials for rigging ships in the age of sail) grew there.

After the outbreak of the American Revolutionary War in 1775 halted penal transportation to the Thirteen Colonies, British prisons started to overcrowd. Several stopgap measures proved ineffective, and the government announced in December 1785 that it would send convicts to parts of what is now known as Australia. In 1786, it included Norfolk Island as an auxiliary settlement, as proposed by John Call, in its plan for colonisation of the Colony of New South Wales. The decision to settle Norfolk Island was taken after Empress Catherine II of Russia's policies (for example in the League of Armed Neutrality of 1780 to 1783) de facto threatened to restrict the sale of hemp. (At the time, practically all the hemp and flax required by the Royal Navy for cordage and sailcloth was imported from Russia.)

After the New South Wales First Fleet arrived at Port Jackson in January 1788, Governor Arthur Phillip ordered Lieutenant Philip Gidley King to lead a party of 15 convicts and seven free men to take control of Norfolk Island, and to prepare for its commercial development. They arrived on 6 March. During the first year of the settlement, which was also called "Sydney" like its parent, more convicts and soldiers were sent to the island from New South Wales. Robert Watson, harbourmaster, arrived with the First Fleet as quartermaster of HMS Sirius, and was still serving in that capacity when the ship was wrecked at Norfolk Island in 1790. Next year, he obtained and cultivated a grant of 60 acres (24 ha) on the island.

As early as 1794, Lieutenant-Governor of New South Wales Francis Grose suggested the closure of Norfolk Island as a penal settlement, as it was too remote and difficult for shipping and too costly to maintain. The first group of people left the island in February 1805, and by 1808, only about 200 remained, forming a small settlement until the remnants were removed in 1813. A small party remained to slaughter stock and destroy all buildings, so that there would be no inducement for anyone, especially from other European powers, to visit and lay claim to the place. From February 1814 until June 1825, the island remained uninhabited.

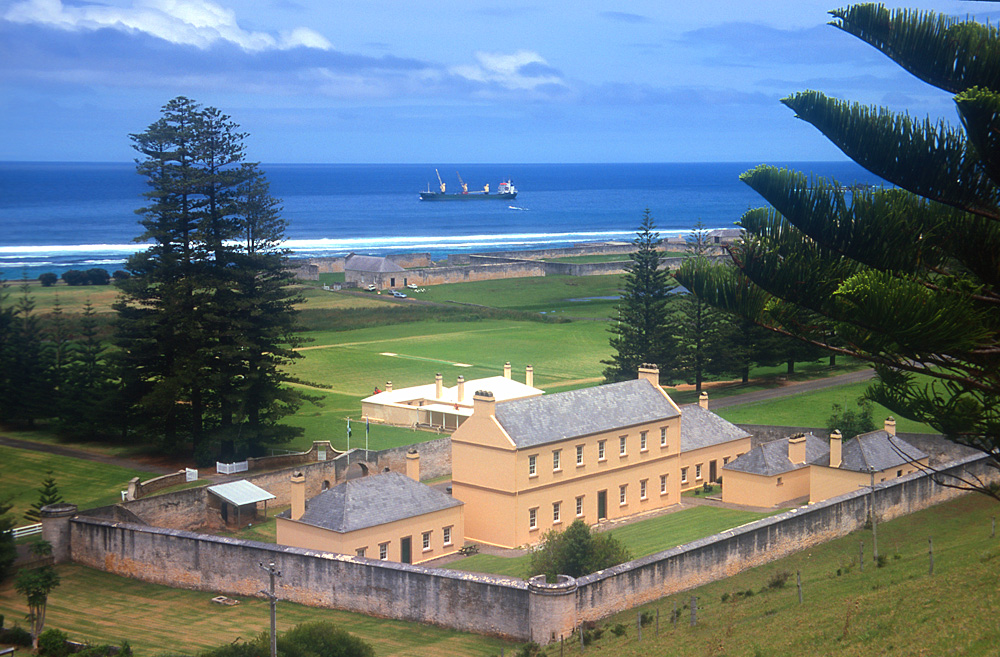
The Old Military Barracks in Kingston

=== Second penal settlement (1824–1856) ===
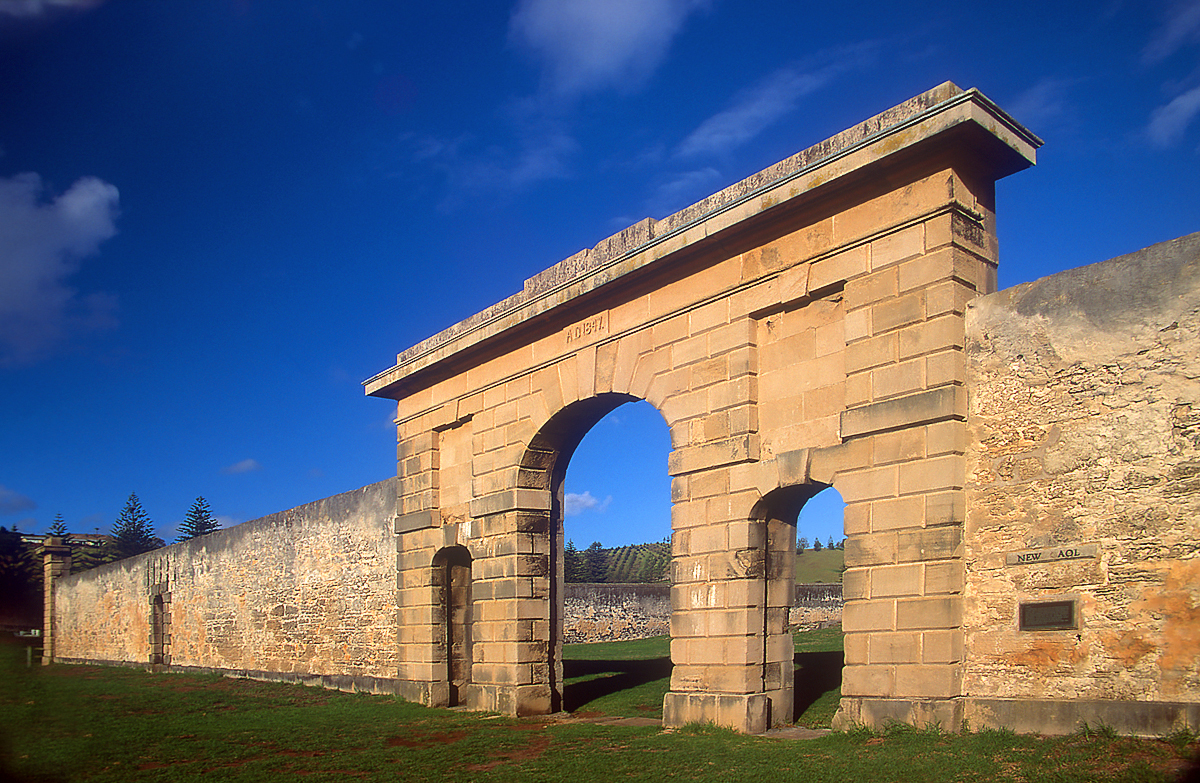
Remains of Norfolk Island gaol

In 1824, the British government instructed the Governor of New South Wales, Thomas Brisbane, to reoccupy Norfolk Island as a place to send "the worst description of convicts".

On 6 June 1825, British occupation of Norfolk Island resumed with the landing of 104 people from the ships Brutus and Mermaid: 57 convicts, one captain, one subaltern, three sergeants, 30 privates, six women and six children.

Its remoteness, previously seen as a disadvantage, was now viewed as an asset for the detention of recalcitrant male prisoners. The convicts detained have long been assumed to be hardcore recidivists, or 'doubly-convicted capital respites' – that is, men transported to Australia who committed fresh crimes in the colony for which they were sentenced to death, but were spared the gallows on condition of life on Norfolk Island. However, a 2011 study, using a database of 6,458 Norfolk Island convicts, has demonstrated that the reality was somewhat different: More than half were detained on Norfolk Island without ever receiving a colonial conviction, and only 15% had been reprieved from a death sentence. Furthermore, the overwhelming majority of convicts sent to Norfolk Island had committed non-violent property offences, and the average length of detention there was three years. Nonetheless, Norfolk Island went through periods of unrest with convicts staging a number of uprisings and mutinies between 1826 and 1846, all of which failed.

Norfolk Island was administered by New South Wales until it was severed from that colony and annexed to Van Diemen's Land by Letters Patent of 24 October 1843, taking effect on 29 September 1844.

The British government began to wind down the second penal settlement after 1847, and the last convicts were removed to Tasmania in May 1855. The island was abandoned because transportation from the United Kingdom to Van Diemen's Land (Tasmania) had ceased in 1853, to be replaced by penal servitude in the UK.

=== Settlement by Pitcairn Islanders (1856–present) ===
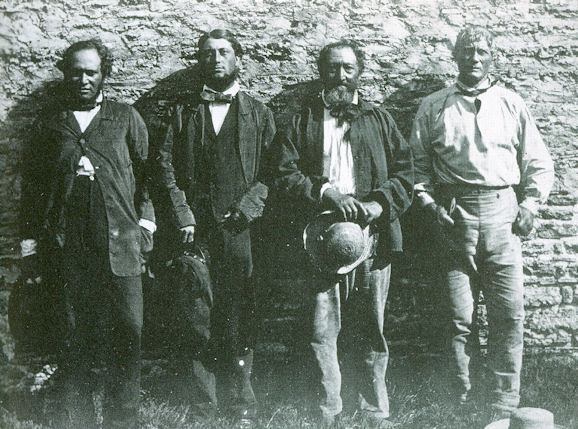
Descendants of the mutineers John Adams and Matthew Quintal on Norfolk Island, 1862. From Left to right:John Adams 1827–1897 son of George Adams; John Quintal 1820–1912 son of Arthur Quintal; George Adams 1804–1873 son of John Adams; Arthur Quintal 1795–1873 son of Matthew Quintal

The next settlement began on 8 June 1856, as the descendants of Tahitians and the HMS Bounty mutineers, including those of Fletcher Christian, were resettled from the Pitcairn Islands, which had become too small for their growing number. On 3 May 1856, 193 people left Pitcairn Islands aboard the Morayshire. On 8 June 194 people arrived, a baby having been born in transit. The Pitcairners occupied many of the buildings remaining from the penal settlements, and gradually established traditional farming and whaling industries on the island. Although some families decided to return to Pitcairn in 1858 and 1863, the island's population continued to grow. They accepted additional settlers, who often arrived on whaling vessels.

The island was a regular resort for whaling vessels in the age of sail. The first such ship was the Britannia in November 1793. The last on record was the Andrew Hicks in August–September 1907. They came for water, wood and provisions, and sometimes they recruited islanders to serve as crewmen on their vessels.

In 1867, the headquarters of the Melanesian Mission of the Church of England was established on the island. In 1920, the Mission was relocated from Norfolk Island to the Solomon Islands to be closer to the focus of population.

Norfolk Island was the subject of several experiments in administration during the century. It began the 19th century as part of the Colony of New South Wales. On 29 September 1844, Norfolk Island was transferred from the Colony of New South Wales to the Colony of Van Diemen's Land. On 1 November 1856 Norfolk Island was separated from the Colony of Tasmania (formerly Van Diemen's Land) and constituted as a "distinct and separate Settlement, the affairs of which should until further Order in that behalf by Her Majesty be administered by a Governor to be for that purpose appointed". The Governor of New South Wales was constituted as the Governor of Norfolk Island.

On 19 March 1897, the office of the Governor of Norfolk Island was abolished and responsibility for the administration of Norfolk Island was vested in the Governor of the Colony of New South Wales. Yet, the island was not made a part of New South Wales and remained separate. The Colony of New South Wales ceased to exist upon the establishment of the Commonwealth of Australia on 1 January 1901, and from that date responsibility for the administration of Norfolk Island was vested in the Governor of the State of New South Wales.

==== 20th century ====
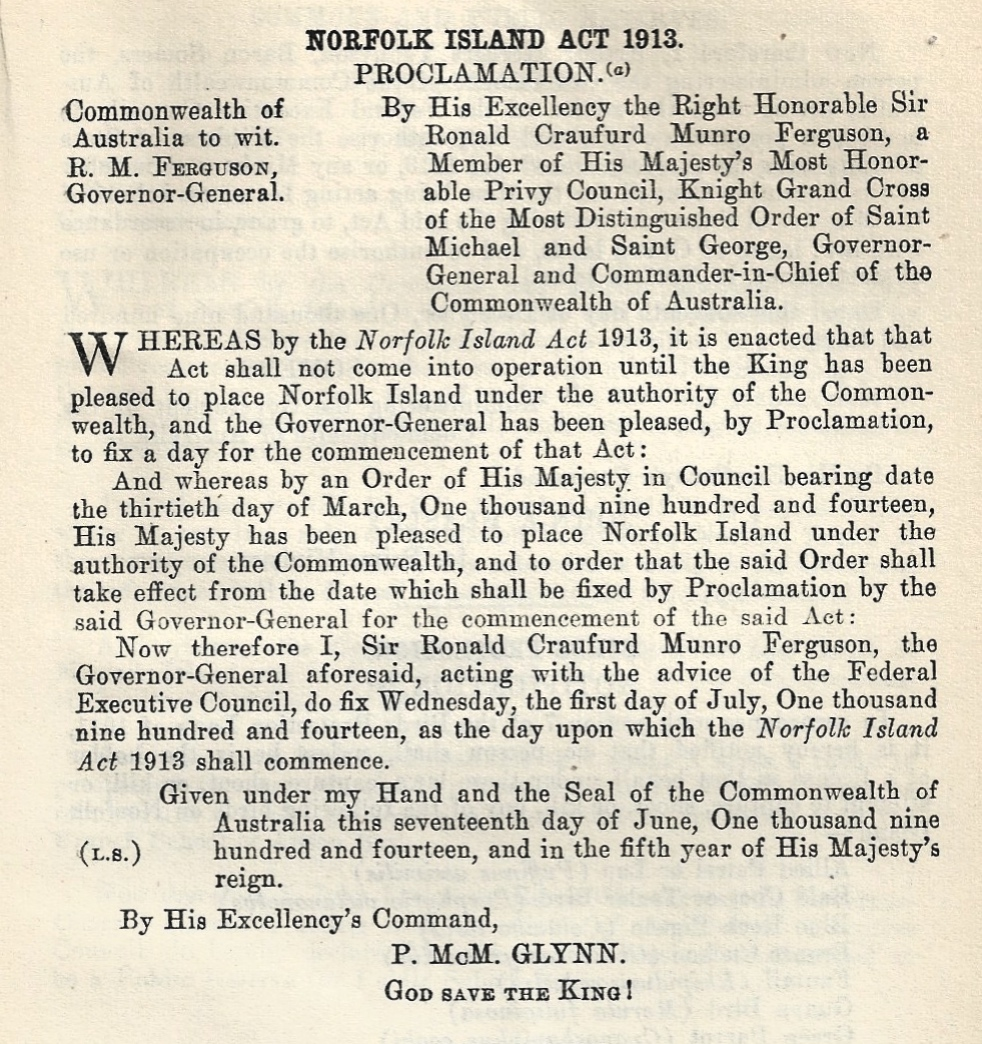
Norfolk Island Act 1913 proclamation, effective 1 July 1914

The Parliament of the Commonwealth of Australia accepted the territory by the Norfolk Island Act 1913 (Cth), subject to British agreement; the act received royal assent on 19 December 1913. In preparation for the handover, a proclamation by the Governor of New South Wales on 23 December 1913 (in force when gazetted on 24 December) repealed "all laws heretofore in force in Norfolk Island" and replaced them by re-enacting a list of such laws. Among those laws was the Administration Law 1913 (NSW), which provided for appointment of an Administrator of Norfolk Island and of magistrates, and contained a code of criminal law.

British agreement was expressed on 30 March 1914, in a UK Order in Council made pursuant to the Australian Waste Lands Act 1855 (Imp). A proclamation by the Governor-General of Australia on 17 June 1914 gave effect to the act and the Order as from 1 July 1914.

During World War II, the island became a key airbase and refuelling depot between Australia and New Zealand and between New Zealand and the Solomon Islands. The airstrip was constructed by Australian, New Zealand and United States servicemen during 1942. Since Norfolk Island fell within New Zealand's area of responsibility, it was garrisoned by a New Zealand Army unit known as N Force at a large army camp that had the capacity to house a 1,500-strong force. N Force relieved a company of the Second Australian Imperial Force. The island proved too remote to come under attack during the war, and N Force left the island in February 1944.

In 1979, Norfolk Island was granted limited self-government by Australia, under which the island elected a government that ran most of the island's affairs.

==== 21st century ====
In 2006, a formal review process took place in which the Australian government considered revising the island's model of government. The review was completed on 20 December 2006, when it was decided that there would be no changes in the governance of Norfolk Island.

Financial problems and a reduction in tourism led to Norfolk Island's administration appealing to the Australian federal government for assistance in 2010. In return, the islanders were to pay income tax for the first time but would be eligible for greater welfare benefits. However, by May 2013, agreement had not been reached and islanders were having to leave to find work and welfare. An agreement was finally signed in Canberra on 12 March 2015 to replace self-government with a local council but against the wishes of the Norfolk Island government. A majority of Norfolk Islanders objected to the Australian plan to make changes to Norfolk Island without first consulting them and allowing their say, with 68% of voters against forced changes. An example of growing friction between Norfolk Island and increased Australian rule was featured in a 2019 episode of Discovery Channel's annual Shark Week. The episode featured Norfolk Island's policy of culling growing cattle populations by killing older cattle and feeding the carcasses to tiger sharks well off the coast. This is done to help prevent tiger sharks from coming further toward shore in search of food. Norfolk Island holds one of the largest populations of tiger sharks in the world. Australia has banned the culling policy as cruelty to animals. Norfolk Islanders fear this will lead to increased shark attacks and damage an already waning tourist industry.

On 4 October 2015, the time zone for Norfolk Island was changed from UTC+11:30 to UTC+11:00.

==== Reduced autonomy 2016 ====
In March 2015, the Australian Government announced comprehensive reforms for Norfolk Island. The action was justified on the grounds it was necessary "to address issues of sustainability which have arisen from the model of self-government requiring Norfolk Island to deliver local, state and federal functions since 1979". On 17 June 2015, the Norfolk Island Legislative Assembly was abolished, with the territory becoming run by an Administrator and an advisory council. Elections for a new Regional Council were held on 28 May 2016, with the new council taking office on 1 July 2016.

From that date, most Australian Commonwealth laws were extended to Norfolk Island. This means that taxation, social security, immigration, customs and health arrangements apply on the same basis as in mainland Australia. Travel between Norfolk Island and mainland Australia became domestic travel on 1 July 2016. For the 2016 Australian federal election, 328 people on Norfolk Island voted in the ACT electorate of Canberra, out of 117,248 total votes. Since 2018, Norfolk Island is covered by the electorate of Bean.

There is opposition to the reforms, led by Norfolk Island People for Democracy Inc., an association appealing to the United Nations to include the island on its list of "non-self-governing territories". There has also been movement to join New Zealand since the autonomy reforms.

In October 2019, the Norfolk Island People For Democracy advocacy group conducted a survey of 457 island residents (about one quarter of the entire population) and found that 37% preferred free association with New Zealand, 35% preferred free association with Australia, 25% preferred full independence, and 3% preferred full integration with Australia.

== Geography ==
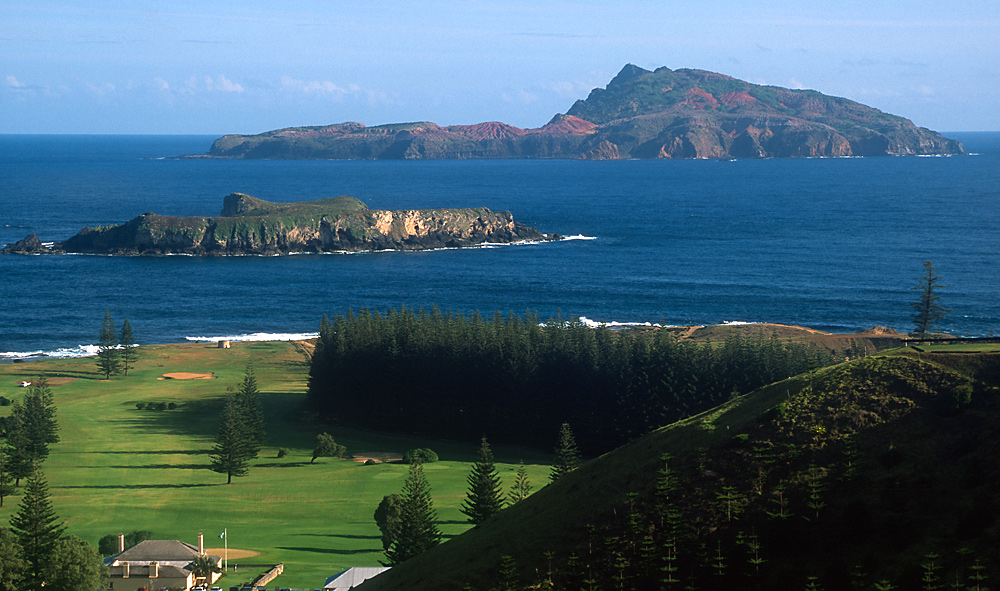
View across to Nepean Island (foreground) and Phillip Island

The Territory of Norfolk Island is located in the South Pacific Ocean, east of the Australian mainland. Norfolk Island itself is the main island of the island group that the territory encompasses and is located at 29°02′S 167°57′E. It has an area of 34.6 square kilometres (13.4 sq mi), with no large-scale internal bodies of water and 32 km (20 mi) of coastline.

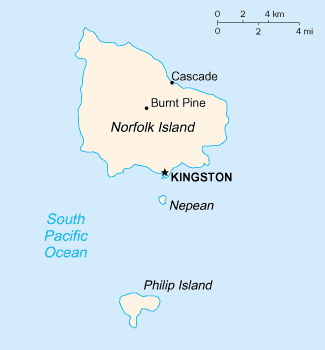
Norfolk Island

The island's highest point is Mount Bates reaching 319 metres (1,047 feet) above sea level, located in the northwest quadrant of the island. The majority of the terrain is suitable for farming and other agricultural uses. Phillip Island, the second largest island of the territory, is located at 29°07′S 167°57′E, seven kilometres (4.3 miles) south of the main island. Norfolk and Phillip islands were formed from several basaltic volcanic eruptions between 3.1 and 2.3 million years ago, with much of the volcanic deposits now eroded. There are four main strata, the oldest being Ball Bay basalts, the 2.66-2.69 million years old, Duncombe Bay basalts, the about 2.4 million years old Cascade basalts and the most recent Steeles Point basalts. The islands form the highest point on the Norfolk Ridge, part of the submerged continent Zealandia. Nepean Island, also to the south of Norfolk Island consists of late Pleistocene coarse marine calcareous rock (sand, coral and shell fragments cemented with lime), a rock type also found in a small area of Norfolk Island near Kingston.

The coastline of Norfolk Island consists, to varying degrees, of cliff faces. A downward slope exists towards Slaughter Bay and Emily Bay, the site of the original colonial settlement of Kingston. There are no safe harbour facilities on Norfolk Island, with loading jetties existing at Kingston and Cascade Bay. All goods not domestically produced are brought in by ship, usually to Cascade Bay. Emily Bay, protected from the Pacific Ocean by a small coral reef, is the only safe area for recreational swimming, although surfing waves can be found at Anson and Ball Bays.

The climate is subtropical and mild, with little seasonal differentiation. The area surrounding Mount Bates is preserved as the Norfolk Island National Park. The park, covering around 10% of the land of the island, contains remnants of the forests which originally covered the island, including stands of subtropical rainforest.

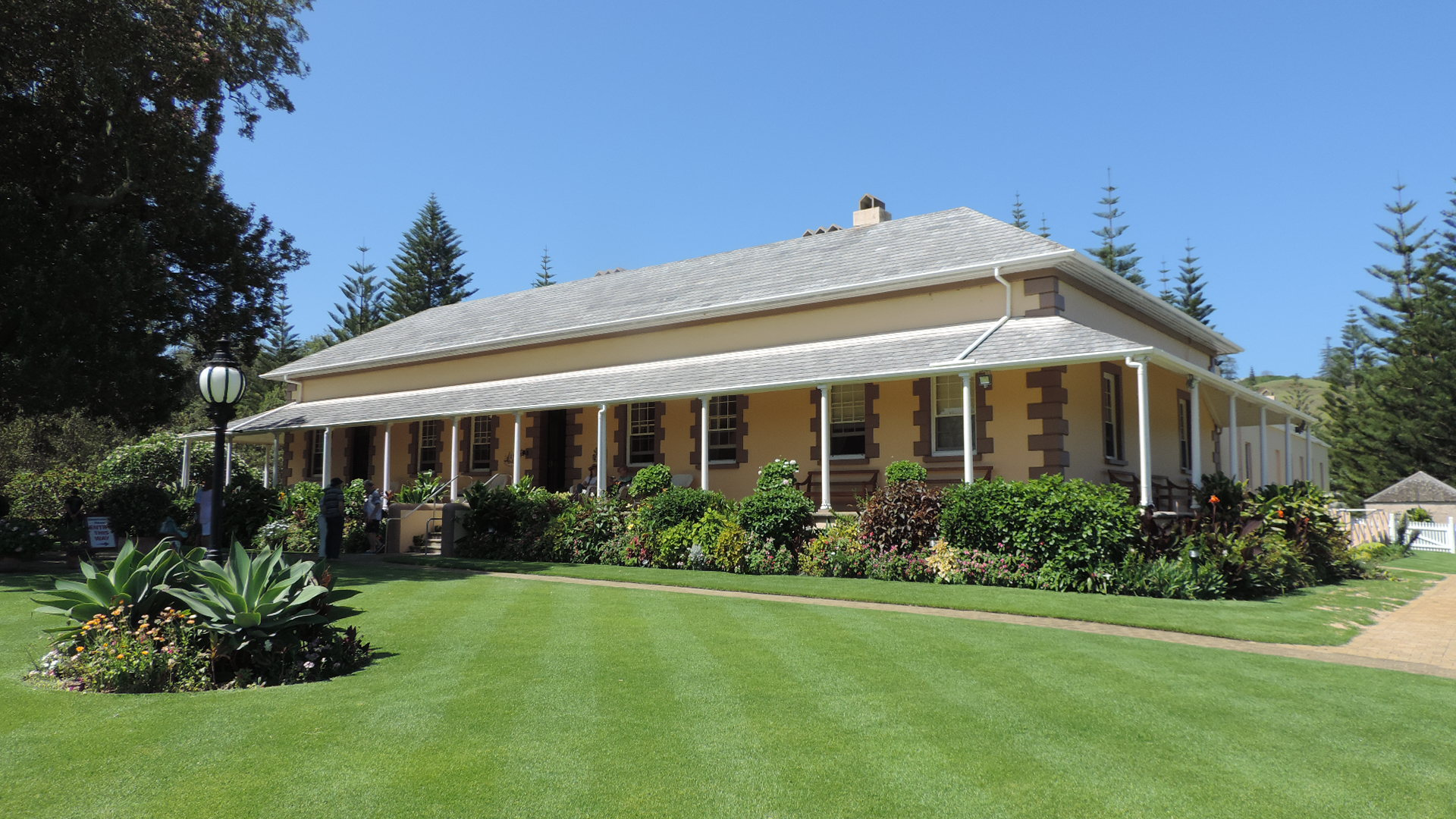
Government House, 2015

The park also includes the two smaller islands to the south of Norfolk Island, Nepean and Phillip islands. The vegetation of Phillip Island was devastated due to the introduction during the penal era of pest animals such as pigs and rabbits, giving it a red-brown colour as viewed from Norfolk; however, pest control and remediation work by park staff has recently brought some improvement to the Phillip Island environment.

The major settlement on Norfolk Island is Burnt Pine, located predominantly along Taylors Road, where the shopping centre, post office, bottle shop, telephone exchange and community hall are located. Settlement also exists over much of the island, consisting largely of widely separated homesteads.

Government House, the official residence of the Administrator, is located on Quality Row in what was the penal settlement of Kingston. Other government buildings, including the court, Legislative Assembly and Administration, are also located there. Kingston's role is largely a ceremonial one, however, with most of the economic impetus coming from Burnt Pine.

=== Climate ===
Norfolk Island has a maritime-influenced humid subtropical climate (Köppen: Cfa) with warm, humid summers and very mild, rainy winters. The highest recorded temperature is 28.5 °C (83.3 °F) on 23 January 2024, whilst the lowest is 6.2 °C (43.2 °F) on 29 July 1953. The island has moderate rainfall of 1,109.9 millimetres (43.70 in), with a maximum in winter; and 52.8 clear days annually.

Climate data for Norfolk Island Airport (29º02'18"S, 167º56'28"E, 112 m AMSL) (1991–2020 normals, extremes 1939–present)
Month	Jan	Feb	Mar	Apr	May	Jun	Jul	Aug	Sep	Oct	Nov	Dec	Year
Record high °C (°F)	28.5 (83.3)	28.4 (83.1)	28.4 (83.1)	27.9 (82.2)	25.1 (77.2)	23.4 (74.1)	22.3 (72.1)	21.8 (71.2)	23.8 (74.8)	24.9 (76.8)	27.4 (81.3)	28.2 (82.8)	28.5 (83.3)
Mean maximum °C (°F)	26.8 (80.2)	27.2 (81.0)	26.5 (79.7)	25.1 (77.2)	23.2 (73.8)	21.5 (70.7)	20.5 (68.9)	20.7 (69.3)	21.7 (71.1)	22.8 (73.0)	24.3 (75.7)	25.9 (78.6)	27.6 (81.7)
Mean daily maximum °C (°F)	24.8 (76.6)	25.3 (77.5)	24.5 (76.1)	23.0 (73.4)	21.1 (70.0)	19.4 (66.9)	18.6 (65.5)	18.5 (65.3)	19.4 (66.9)	20.4 (68.7)	21.9 (71.4)	23.6 (74.5)	21.7 (71.1)
Daily mean °C (°F)	22.1 (71.8)	22.7 (72.9)	22.0 (71.6)	20.5 (68.9)	18.8 (65.8)	17.2 (63.0)	16.3 (61.3)	16.0 (60.8)	16.8 (62.2)	17.8 (64.0)	19.1 (66.4)	20.9 (69.6)	19.2 (66.6)
Mean daily minimum °C (°F)	19.5 (67.1)	20.2 (68.4)	19.5 (67.1)	18.0 (64.4)	16.5 (61.7)	14.9 (58.8)	14.0 (57.2)	13.5 (56.3)	14.3 (57.7)	15.2 (59.4)	16.4 (61.5)	18.2 (64.8)	16.7 (62.1)
Mean minimum °C (°F)	16.7 (62.1)	17.8 (64.0)	16.8 (62.2)	15.3 (59.5)	13.9 (57.0)	12.1 (53.8)	11.3 (52.3)	10.7 (51.3)	11.3 (52.3)	12.4 (54.3)	13.2 (55.8)	15.2 (59.4)	10.5 (50.9)
Record low °C (°F)	12.1 (53.8)	12.8 (55.0)	12.1 (53.8)	9.7 (49.5)	6.6 (43.9)	7.1 (44.8)	6.2 (43.2)	6.7 (44.1)	7.7 (45.9)	8.2 (46.8)	8.7 (47.7)	11.4 (52.5)	6.2 (43.2)
Average precipitation mm (inches)	80.3 (3.16)	86.8 (3.42)	106.8 (4.20)	95.4 (3.76)	101.5 (4.00)	120.6 (4.75)	122.5 (4.82)	99.6 (3.92)	78.4 (3.09)	62.0 (2.44)	72.0 (2.83)	83.9 (3.30)	1,109.9 (43.70)
Average precipitation days (≥ 1.0 mm)	7.7	8.8	9.3	10.3	12.2	13.0	13.6	12.2	9.4	7.5	6.8	6.7	117.5
Average afternoon relative humidity (%)	71	72	69	69	69	69	68	67	69	67	67	70	69
Average dew point °C (°F)	17.6 (63.7)	18.2 (64.8)	16.8 (62.2)	15.4 (59.7)	13.6 (56.5)	12.3 (54.1)	11.1 (52.0)	10.8 (51.4)	12.1 (53.8)	12.6 (54.7)	13.8 (56.8)	16.2 (61.2)	14.2 (57.6)
Mean monthly sunshine hours	238.7	203.4	204.6	198.0	189.1	168.0	186.0	223.2	219.0	241.8	249.0	241.8	2,562.6
Percentage possible sunshine	56	55	54	58	57	54	57	65	61	61	61	56	58
Source: Bureau of Meteorology (1991–2020 normals, extremes 1939–present)

=== Environment ===
Norfolk Island is part of the Interim Biogeographic Regionalisation for Australia region "Pacific Subtropical Islands" (PSI), and forms subregion PSI02, with an area of 3,908 hectares (9,660 acres). The country is home to the Norfolk Island subtropical forests terrestrial ecoregion.

==== Flora ====
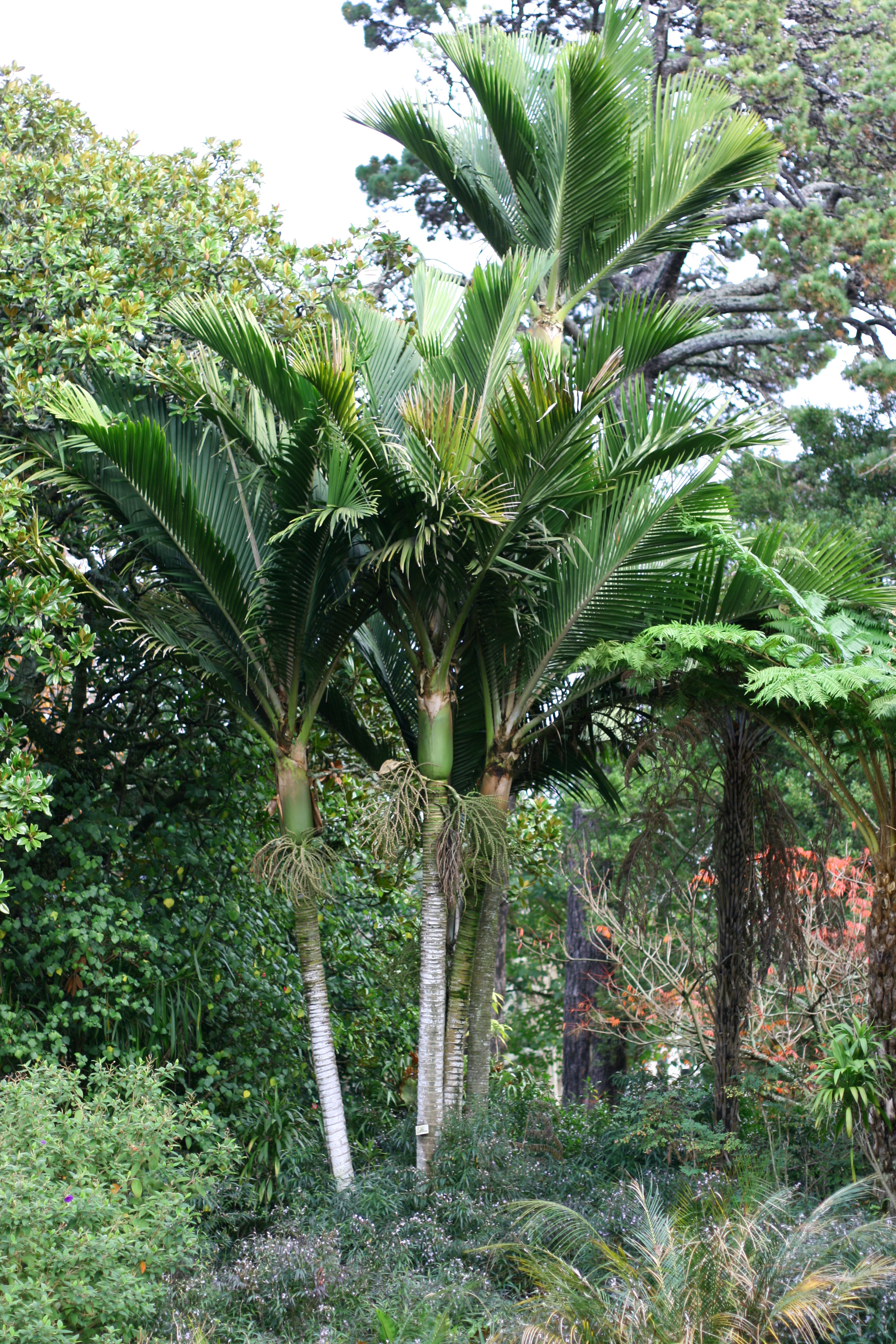
Rhopalostylis baueri, a native palm

Norfolk Island has 174 native plants; 51 of them are endemic. At least 18 of the endemic species are rare or threatened. The Norfolk Island palm (Rhopalostylis baueri) and the smooth tree-fern (Cyathea brownii), the tallest tree-fern in the world, are common in the Norfolk Island National Park but rare elsewhere on the island. Before European colonisation, most of Norfolk Island was covered with subtropical rain forest, the canopy of which was made of Araucaria heterophylla (Norfolk Island pine) in exposed areas, and the palm Rhopalostylis baueri and tree ferns Cyathea brownii and C. australis in moister protected areas. The understory was thick with lianas and ferns covering the forest floor. Only one small tract, 5 km^{2} (1.9 sq mi), of rainforest remains, which was declared as the Norfolk Island National Park in 1986.

This forest has been infested with several introduced plants. The cliffs and steep slopes of Mount Pitt supported a community of shrubs, herbaceous plants, and climbers. A few tracts of cliff top and seashore vegetation have been preserved. The rest of the island has been cleared for pasture and housing. Grazing and introduced weeds currently threaten the native flora, displacing it in some areas. In fact, there are more weed species than native species on Norfolk Island.

==== Fauna ====
As a relatively small and isolated oceanic island, Norfolk has few land birds but a high degree of endemicity among them. Norfolk Island is home to a radiation of about 40 endemic snail species. Many of the endemic bird species and subspecies have become extinct as a result of massive clearance of the island's native vegetation of subtropical rainforest for agriculture, hunting and persecution as agricultural pests. The birds have also suffered from the introduction of mammals such as rats, cats, foxes, pigs and goats, as well as from introduced competitors such as common blackbirds and crimson rosellas. Although the island is politically part of Australia, many of Norfolk Island's native birds show affinities to those of neighbouring New Zealand, such as the Norfolk kākā, Norfolk pigeon, and Norfolk boobook.

Extinctions include that of the endemic Norfolk kākā, Norfolk ground dove and Norfolk pigeon, while of the endemic subspecies the starling, triller, thrush and boobook owl are extinct, although the latter's genes persist in a hybrid population descended from the last female. Other endemic birds are the white-chested white-eye, which may be extinct, the Norfolk parakeet, the Norfolk gerygone, the slender-billed white-eye and endemic subspecies of the Pacific robin and golden whistler. Subfossil bones indicate that a species of Coenocorypha snipe was also found on the island and is now extinct, but the taxonomic relationships of this are unclear and have not been scientifically described yet.

The Norfolk Island Group Nepean Island is also home to breeding seabirds. The providence petrel was hunted to local extinction by the beginning of the 19th century but has shown signs of returning to breed on Phillip Island. Other seabirds breeding there include the white-necked petrel, Kermadec petrel, wedge-tailed shearwater, Australasian gannet, red-tailed tropicbird and grey ternlet. The sooty tern (known locally as the whale bird) has traditionally been subject to seasonal egg harvesting by Norfolk Islanders.

Norfolk Island, with neighbouring Nepean Island, has been identified by BirdLife International as an Important Bird Area because it supports the entire populations of white-chested and slender-billed white-eyes, Norfolk parakeets and Norfolk gerygones, as well as over 1% of the world populations of wedge-tailed shearwaters and red-tailed tropicbirds. Nearby Phillip Island is treated as a separate IBA.

Norfolk Island also has a botanical garden, which is home to a sizeable variety of plant species. However, the island has only one native mammal, Gould's wattled bat (Chalinolobus gouldii). It is very rare, and may already be extinct on the island.

The Norfolk swallowtail (Papilio amynthor) is a species of butterfly that is found on Norfolk Island and the Loyalty Islands.

Cetaceans were historically abundant around the island as commercial hunts on the island were operating until 1956. Today, numbers of larger whales have disappeared, but even today many species such humpback whale, minke whale, sei whale, and dolphins can be observed close to shore, and scientific surveys have been conducted regularly. Southern right whales were once regular migrants to Norfolk, but were severely depleted by historical hunts, and further by recent illegal Soviet and Japanese whaling, resulting in none or very few, if remnants still live, right whales in these regions along with Lord Howe Island.

Whale sharks can be encountered off the island as well.

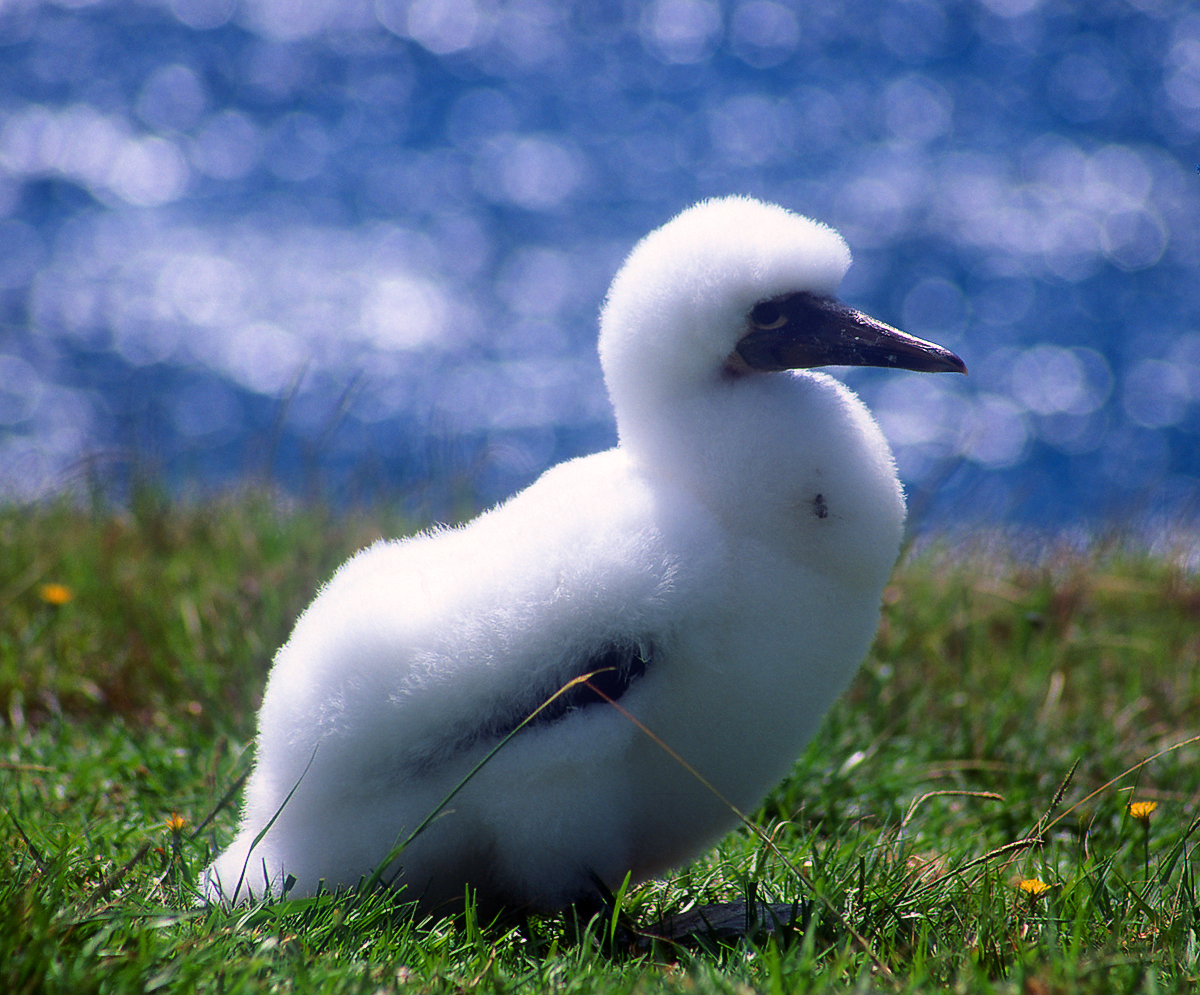
Gannet

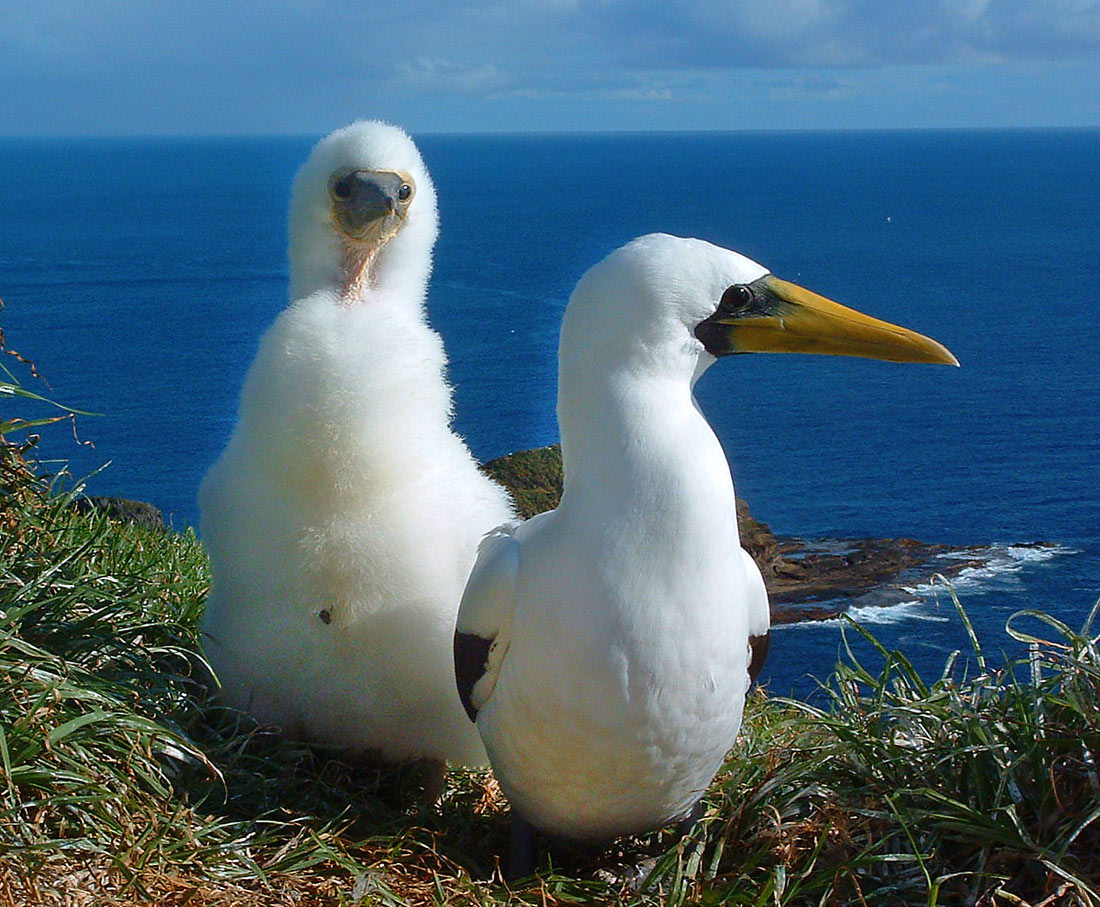
Masked boobies

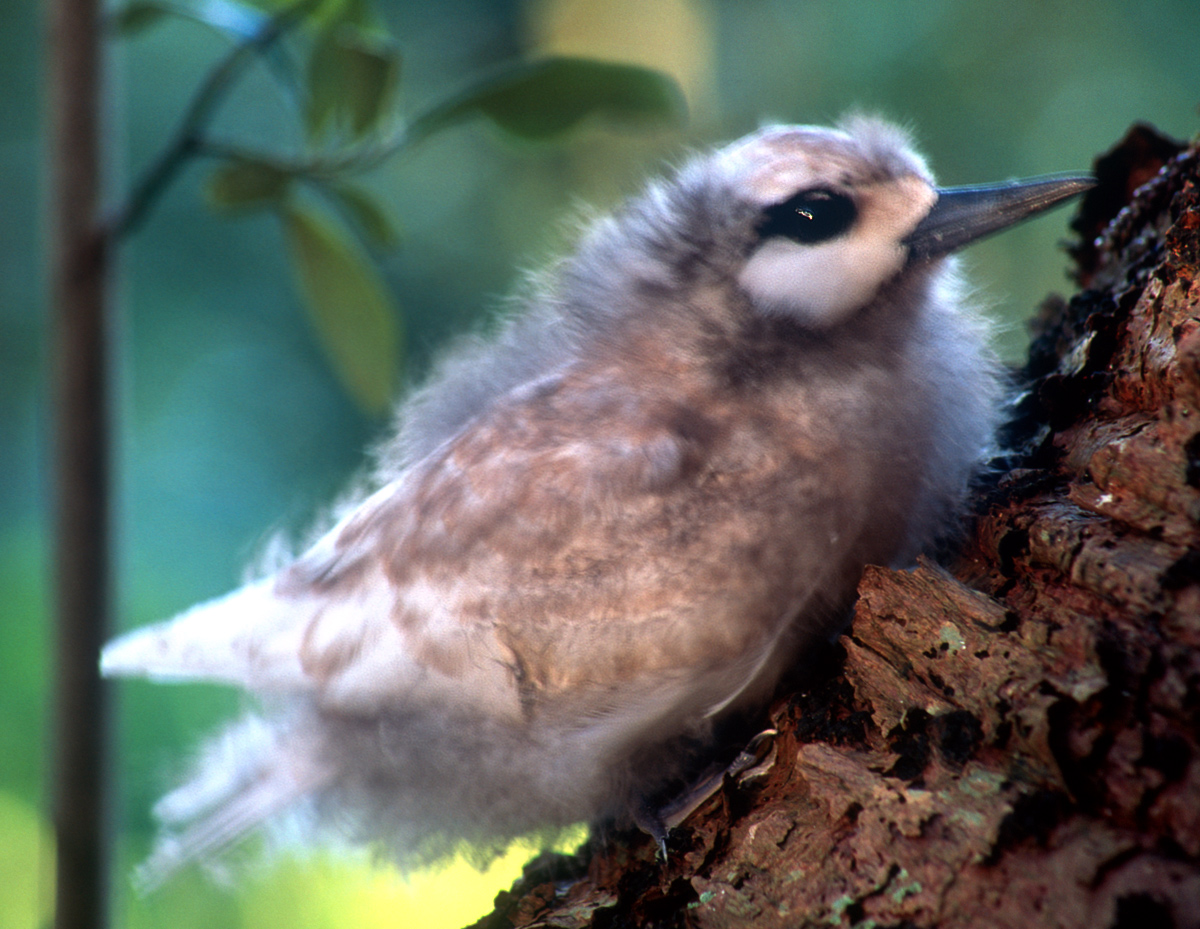
White tern

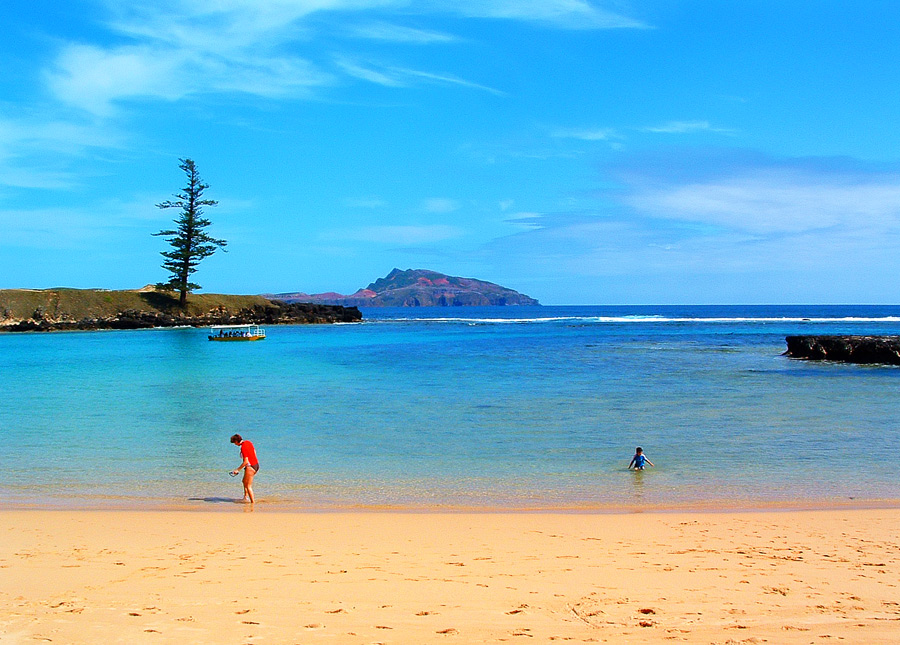
Emily Bay

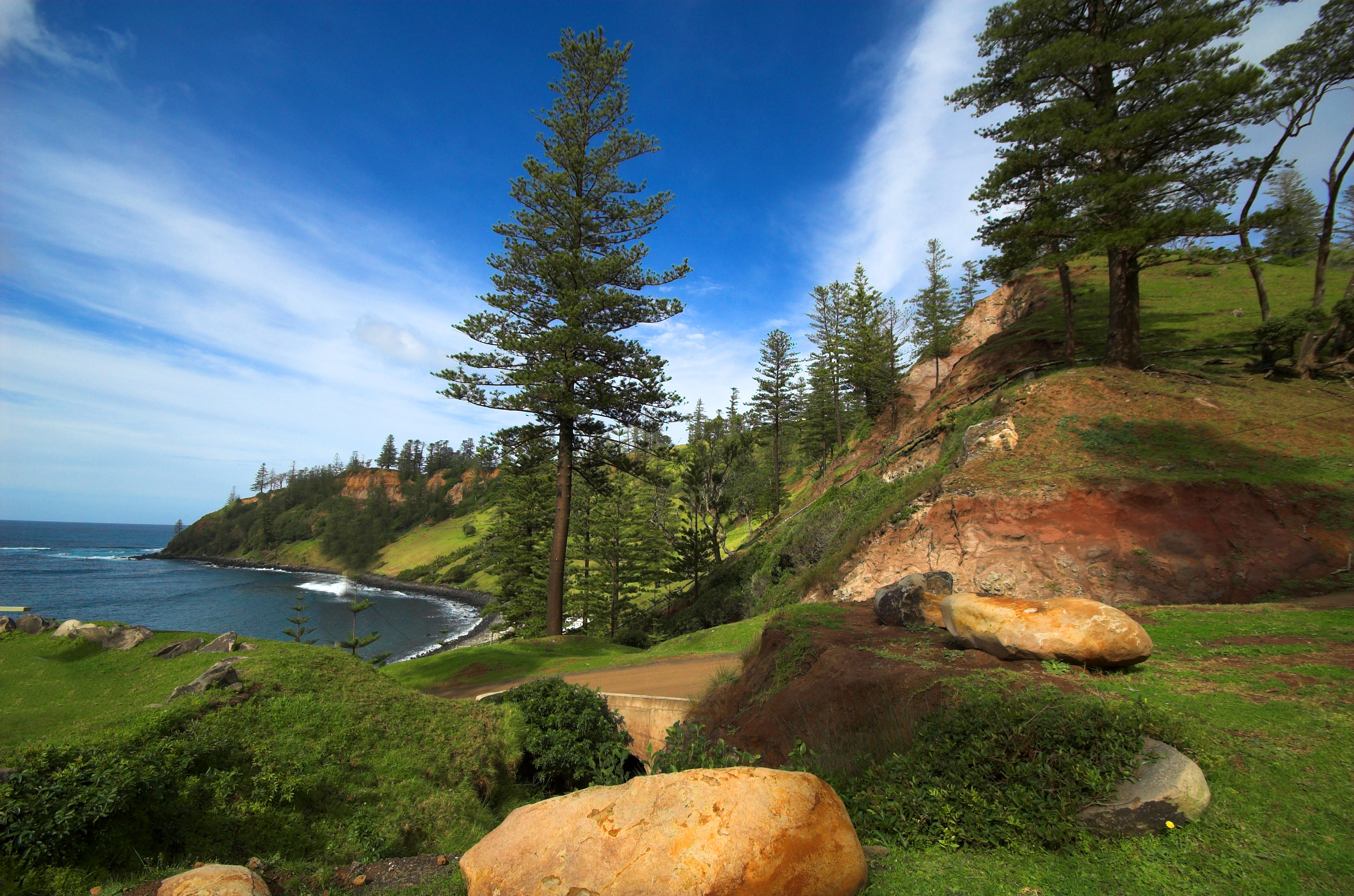
Norfolk Island pines

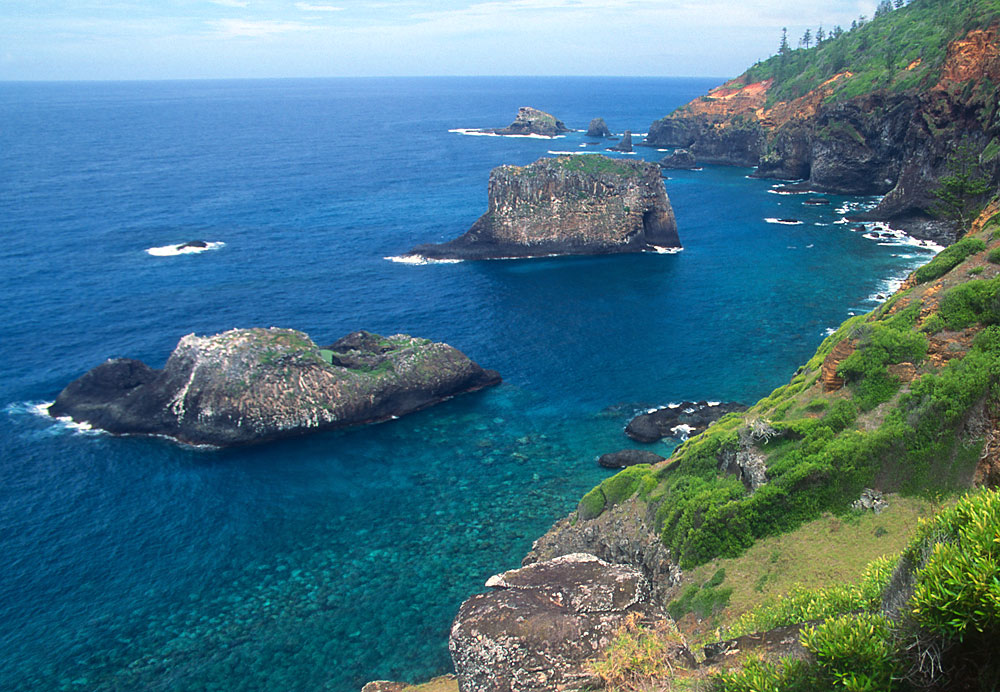
Captain Cook Lookout

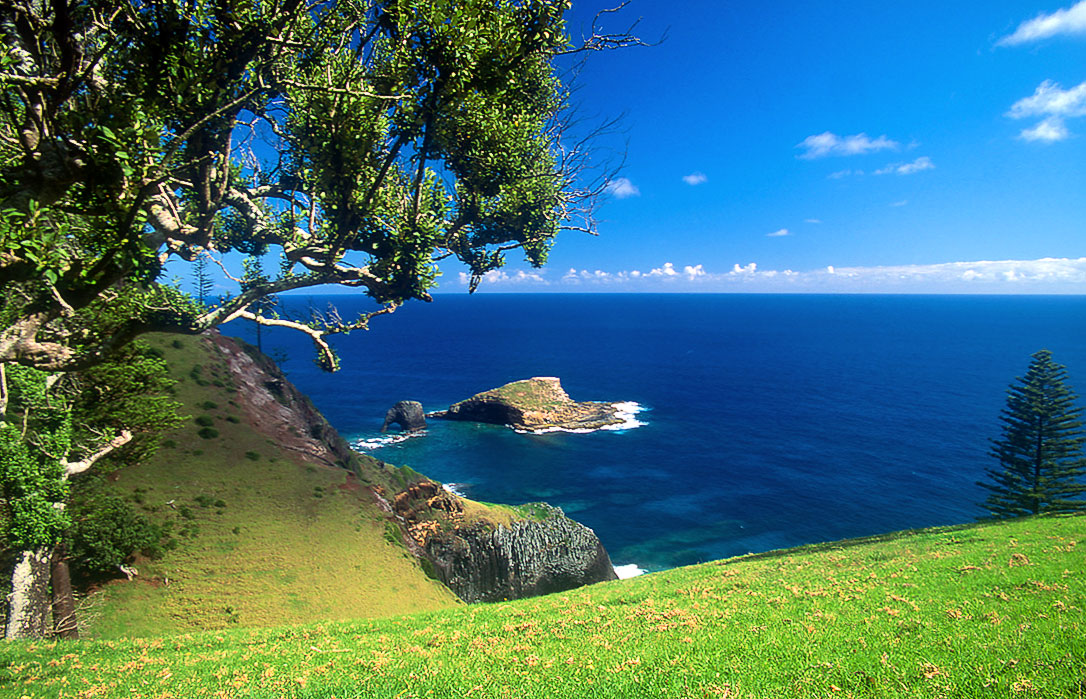
Bird Rock (off the north coast)

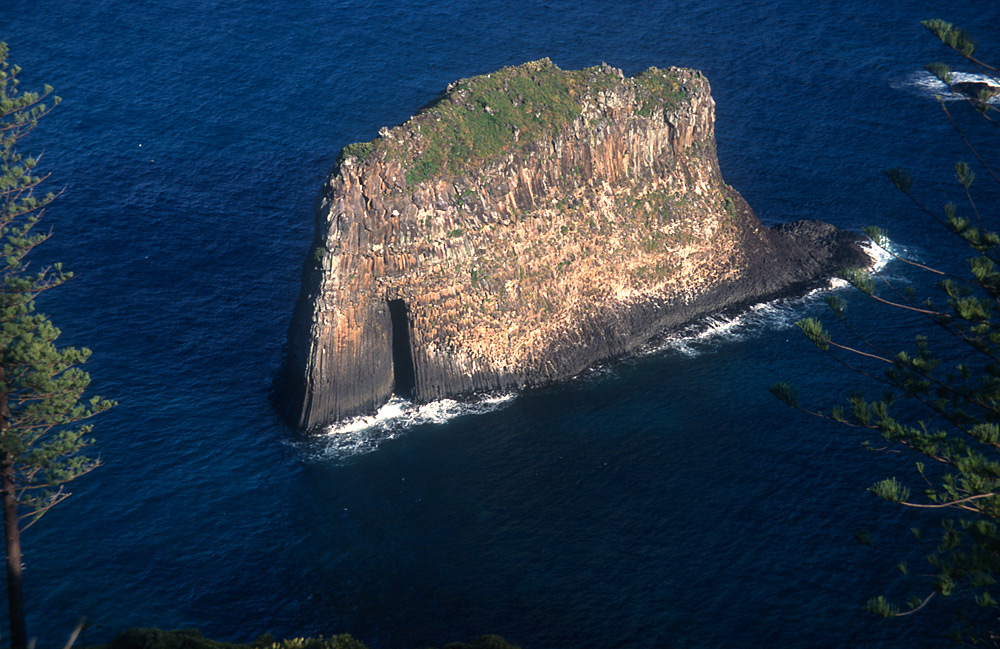
Cathedral Rock (off the north coast)

==== List of endemic and extirpated native birds ====
- Norfolk parakeet, Cyanoramphus cookii (endangered)
- Norfolk kākā, Nestor productus (extinct)
- Brown goshawk, Accipiter fasciatus (extirpated)
- Norfolk pigeon, Hemiphaga novaseelandiae spadicea (extinct, subspecies of NZ pigeon)
- Norfolk ground dove, Aloepecoenas norfolkensis (extinct)
- Norfolk snipe, Coenocorypha spp. (extinct, undescribed)
- Norfolk rail, Gallirallus spp. (extinct, undescribed)
- Norfolk robin, Petroica multicolor (endangered)
- Norfolk golden whistler, Pachycephala pectoralis xanthoprocta (vulnerable, subspecies of golden whistler)
- Norfolk triller, Lalage leucopyga leucopyga (extinct, nominate subspecies of long-tailed triller)
- Norfolk Island thrush, Turdus poliocephalus poliocephalus (extinct, nominate subspecies of Island thrush)
- Norfolk Island starling, Aplonis fusca fusca (extinct, nominate subspecies of extinct Tasman starling)
- Norfolk boobook, Ninox novaeseelandiae undulata (extinct except for hybrids with nominate subspecies, subspecies of Morepork\Southern boobook)
- White-chested white-eye, Zosterops albogularis (critically endangered, possibly extinct)
- Slender-billed white-eye, Zosterops tenuirostris (near threatened)
- Norfolk gerygone, Gerygone modesta (near threatened)
- Norfolk grey fantail, Rhiphidura albiscapa pelzelni (least concern, subspecies of grey fantail)
- Norfolk petrel, Pterodroma spp. (extinct, undescribed)

== Demographics ==
The population of Norfolk Island was 2,188 in the 2021 census, which had declined from a high of 2,601 in 2001.

In 2011, residents were 78% of the census count, with the remaining 22% being visitors. 16% of the population were 14 years and under, 54% were 15 to 64 years, and 24% were 65 years and over. The figures showed an ageing population, with many people aged 20–34 having moved away from the island.

Most islanders are of either European-only (mostly British) or combined European-Tahitian ancestry, being descendants of the Bounty mutineers as well as more recent arrivals from Australia and New Zealand. About half of the islanders can trace their roots back to Pitcairn Island.

This common heritage has led to a limited number of surnames among the islanders – a limit constraining enough that the island's telephone directory also includes nicknames for many subscribers, such as Carrots, Dar Bizziebee, Diddles, Geek, Lettuce Leaf, Possum, Pumpkin, Smudgie, Truck and Wiggy.

=== Structure of the population ===
Population by sex and age group (Census 09.VIII.2011):

Age group	Male	Female	Total	%
Total	1 082	1 220	2 302	100
0–4	53	53	106	4.60
5–9	63	60	123	5.34
10–14	69	63	132	5.73
15–19	35	38	73	3.17
20–24	20	21	41	1.78
25–29	19	41	60	2.61
30–34	48	52	100	4.34
35–39	56	71	127	5.52
40–44	64	82	146	6.34
45–49	81	86	167	7.25
50–54	86	94	180	7.82
55–59	103	129	232	10.08
60–64	120	142	262	11.38
65–69	99	106	205	8.91
70–74	70	72	142	6.17
75–79	49	47	96	4.17
80–84	24	34	58	2.52
85+	23	29	52	2.26
Age group	Male	Female	Total	Percent
0–14	185	176	361	15.68
15–64	632	756	1 388	60.30
65+	265	288	553	24.02

Population

- 1748 (as of the 2016 census)

Population growth rate

- 0.01%

Ancestry

- Australian (22.8%)
- English (22.4%)
- Pitcairn Islander (20%)
- Scottish (6%)
- Irish (5.2%)

Citizenship (as of the 2011 census)

- Australia 79.5%
- New Zealand 13.3%
- Fiji 2.5%
- Philippines 1.1%
- United Kingdom 1%
- Other 1.8%
- Unspecified 0.8%

=== Religion ===
62% of the islanders are Christians. After the death of the first chaplain Rev G. H. Nobbs in 1884, a Methodist church was formed, followed in 1891 by a Seventh-day Adventist congregation led by one of Nobbs' sons. Some unhappiness with G. H. Nobbs, the more organised and formal ritual of the Church of England service arising from the influence of the Melanesian Mission, decline in spirituality, the influence of visiting American whalers, literature sent by Christians overseas impressed by the Pitcairn story, and the adoption of Seventh-day Adventism by the descendants of the mutineers still on Pitcairn, all contributed to these developments.

The Roman Catholic Church began an ongoing presence on Norfolk Island in 1957. In the late 1990s, a group left the former Methodist (then Uniting Church) and formed a charismatic fellowship. In the 2021 Census, 22% of the ordinary residents identified as Anglican (compared to 34% in 2011), 13% as Uniting Church, 11% as Roman Catholic and 3% as Seventh-day Adventist. 9% were from other religions. 35.7% had no religion (up from 24% in 2011), and 14.7% did not indicate a religion. Typical ordinary congregations in any church do not exceed 30 local residents as of 2010. The three older denominations have good facilities. Ministers are usually short-term visitors.

There are two Anglican churches on Norfolk Island, All Saints Kingston (established 1870) and St Barnabas Chapel (established 1880 as the Melanesian Mission) which are both part of the Diocese of Sydney, Anglican Church of Australia.

There is one Roman Catholic church on Norfolk Island, the Church of St Philip Howard within the Archdiocese of Sydney.

Statistics in 2016 Census:

- Protestant 46.8%
  - Anglican 29.2%
  - Uniting Church in Australia 9.8%
  - Seventh-Day Adventist 2.7%
- Roman Catholic 12.6%
- Other 1.4%
- None 26.7%
- Unspecified 9.5%

=== Country of birth ===
All information below is from the 2016 Census.

- Australia (39.7%)
- Norfolk Island (22.1%)
- New Zealand (17.6%)
- Fiji (2.7%)
- England (2.6%)
- Philippines (2.3%)

=== Language ===
Islanders speak both English and a creole language known as Norfuk, a blend of 18th-century English and Tahitian, based on Pitkern. The Norfuk language is decreasing in popularity as more tourists visit the island, and more young people leave for work and education. However, efforts are being made to keep it alive via dictionaries and the renaming of some tourist attractions to their Norfuk equivalents.

In 2004, an act of the Norfolk Island Assembly made Norfuk a co-official language of the island. The act is long-titled: "An Act to recognise the Norfolk Island Language (Norf'k) as an official language of Norfolk Island". The "language known as 'Norf'k'" is described as the language "that is spoken by descendants of the first free settlers of Norfolk Island who were descendants of the settlers of Pitcairn Island". The act recognises and protects use of the language but does not require it; in official use, it must be accompanied by an accurate translation into English. 32% of the total population reported speaking a language other than English in the 2011 census, and just under three-quarters of the ordinarily resident population could speak Norfuk.

Languages of Norfolk Island most frequently spoken at home in given census year
Language	2016	2021
English	45.5%	52.4%
Norfuk	40.9%	30.5%
Fijian	2.0%	1.2%
Tagalog	1.0%	0.8%
Filipino	0.8%	0.5%
Mandarin Chinese	0.7%	0.5%

== Education ==
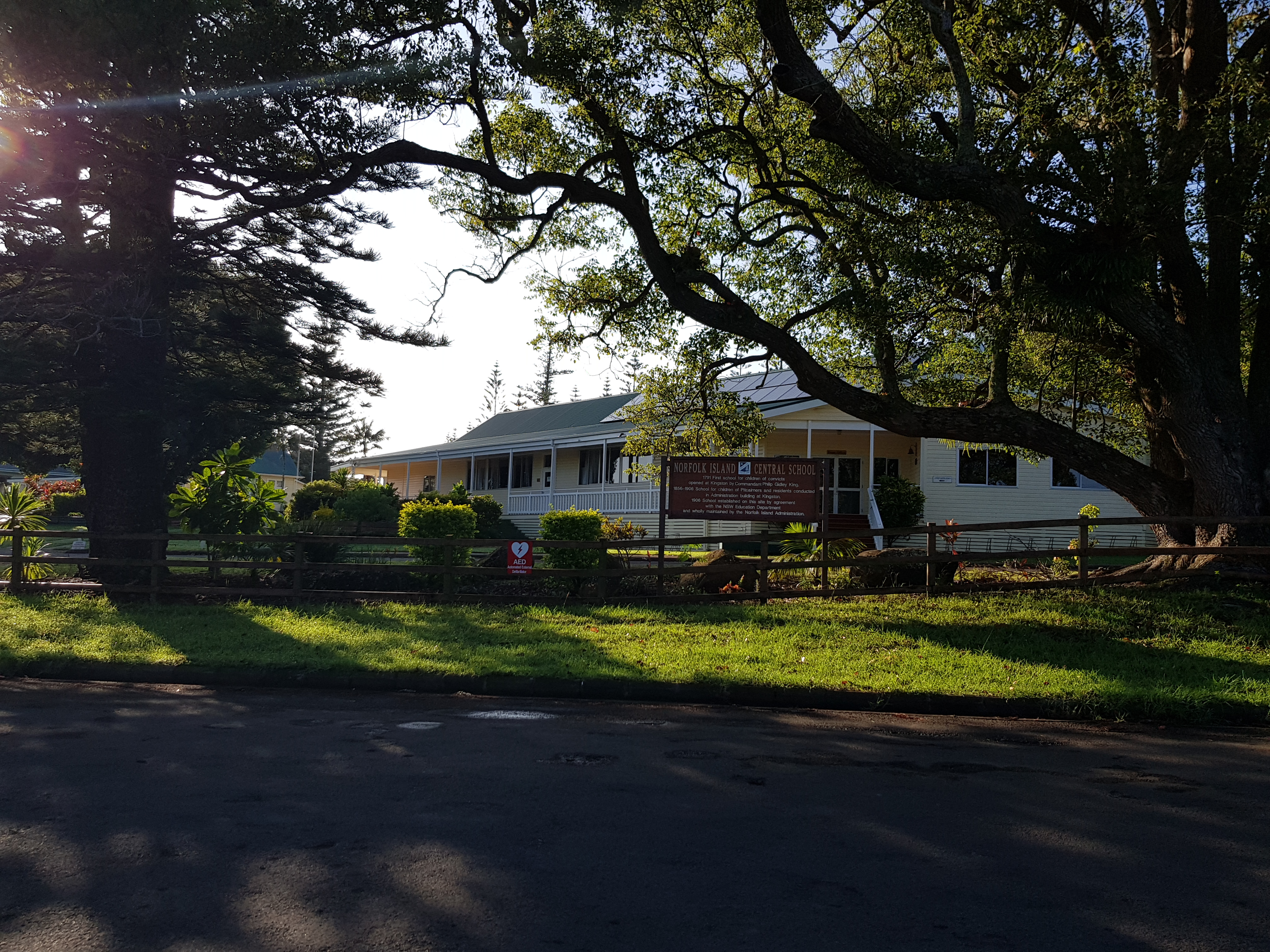
Norfolk Island Central School

The sole school on the island, Norfolk Island Central School, provides education from kindergarten through to Year 12. The school had a contractual arrangement referred to as a Memorandum of Understanding with the New South Wales Department of Education regarding the provision of education services at the school, the latest of which took effect in January 2015. In 2015 enrolment at the Norfolk Island Central School was 282 students. As of 1 January 2022, The Department of Education (Queensland) took over the running of the Norfolk Island Central School in line with the transition of state services from the New South Wales Government to the Queensland Government. The NSW curriculum will continue to be utilised until the end of the 2023 school year.

Children on the island learn English as well as Norfuk, in efforts to revive the language.

No public tertiary education infrastructure exists on the island. The Norfolk Island Central School works in partnership with registered training organisations (RTOs) and local employers to support students accessing Vocational Education and Training (VET) courses.

Literacy is not recorded officially. Islanders attend a school which uses a New South Wales curriculum, before traditionally moving to the mainland for further study.

== Culture ==
While there was no "indigenous" culture on the island at the time of settlement, the Tahitian influence of the Pitcairn settlers has resulted in some aspects of Polynesian culture being adapted to that of Norfolk, including the hula dance. Local cuisine also shows influences from the same region.

Islanders traditionally spend a lot of time outdoors, with fishing and other aquatic pursuits being common pastimes, an aspect which has become more noticeable as the island becomes more accessible to tourism. Most island families have at least one member involved in primary production in some form.

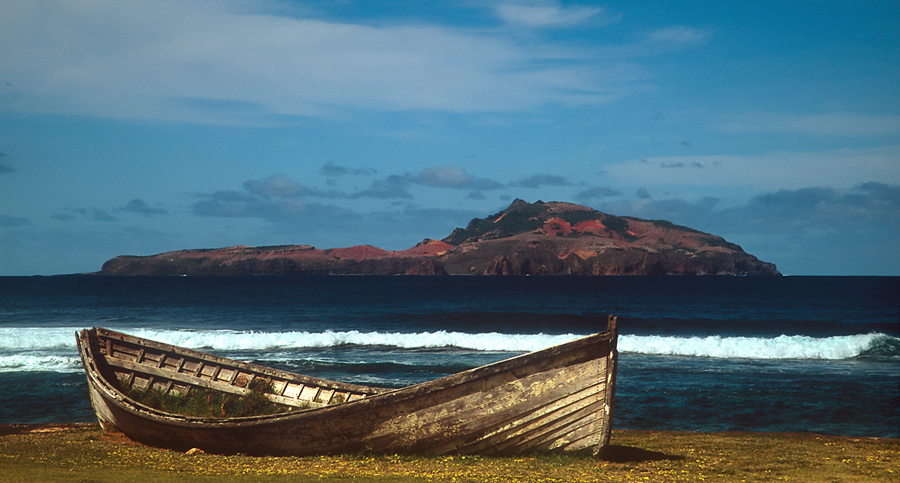
View across to Phillip Island

Religious observance remains an important part of life for some islanders, particularly the older generations, but actual attendance is about 8% of the resident population plus some tourists. In the 2006 census, 19.9% had no religion compared with 13.2% in 1996. Businesses are closed on Wednesday and Saturday afternoons and Sundays.

One of the island's long-term residents was the novelist Colleen McCullough, whose works include The Thorn Birds and the Masters of Rome series as well as Morgan's Run, set, in large part, on Norfolk Island. Ruth Park, notable author of The Harp in the South and many other works of fiction, also lived on the island for several years after the death of her husband, writer D'Arcy Niland. Actress/singer Helen Reddy also moved to the island in 2002, and maintained a house there.

American novelist James A. Michener, who served in the United States Navy during World War II, set one of the chapters of his episodic novel Tales of the South Pacific on Norfolk Island.

The island is one of the few locations outside North America to celebrate the holiday of Thanksgiving.

Norfolk Island has a number of museums and heritage organisations, including Norfolk Island Museum and Bounty Museum. The former has five sites within the Kingston and Arthur's Vale Historic Area, a World Heritage Site also linked to the Australian Convict Sites.

=== Cuisine ===
The cuisine of Norfolk Island is very similar to that of the Pitcairn Islands, as Norfolk Islanders trace their origins to Pitcairn. The local cuisine is a blend of British cuisine and Tahitian cuisine.

Recipes from Norfolk Island of Pitcairn origin include mudda (green banana dumplings) and kumara pilhi. The island's cuisine also includes foods not found on Pitcairn, such as chopped salads and fruit pies.

=== Settlements ===
There are several settlements on Norfolk Island; they are all either towns or hamlets. There are no cities on Norfolk Island.

- Kingston (official capital)
- Anson Bay
- Bumboras
- Burnt Pine (largest town, with airport nearby)
- Cascade
- Longridge
- Middlegate
- Rocky Point
- Steeles Point

== Government and politics ==
Norfolk Island was the only non-mainland Australian territory to have had self-governance. The Norfolk Island Act 1979, passed by the Parliament of Australia in 1979, is the Act under which the island was governed until the passing of the Norfolk Island Legislation Amendment Act 2015 (Cth). The Australian government maintains authority on the island through an Administrator, currently Fiona McKergow.

From 1979 to 2015, a Legislative Assembly was elected by popular vote for terms of not more than three years, although legislation passed by the Australian Parliament could extend its laws to the territory at will, including the power to override any laws made by the assembly. The Assembly consisted of nine seats, with electors casting nine equal votes, of which no more than two could be given to any individual candidate. It is a method of voting called a "weighted first past the post system". Four of the members of the Assembly formed the Executive Council, which devised policy and acted as an advisory body to the Administrator. The last Chief Minister of Norfolk Island was Lisle Snell. Other ministers included: Minister for Tourism, Industry and Development; Minister for Finance; Minister for Cultural Heritage and Community Services; and Minister for Environment.

All seats were held by independent candidates. Norfolk Island did not embrace party politics. In 2007, a branch of the Australian Labor Party was formed on Norfolk Island, with the aim of reforming the system of government.

Since 2018, residents of Norfolk Island have voted in the Division of Bean for House of Representatives elections. Norfolk Island voters are represented in the Senate together with those of the ACT. As is the case for all Australian citizens, enrollment and voting is compulsory for Norfolk Islanders.

Disagreements over the island's relationship with Australia were put in sharper relief by a 2006 review undertaken by the Australian government. Under the more radical of two models proposed in the review, the island's legislative assembly would have been reduced to the status of a local council. However, in December 2006, citing the "significant disruption" that changes to the governance would impose on the island's economy, the Australian government ended the review leaving the existing governance arrangements unaltered.

In a move that apparently surprised many islanders, the Chief Minister of Norfolk Island, David Buffett, announced on 6 November 2010 that the island would voluntarily surrender its self-government status in return for a financial bailout from the federal government to cover significant debts.

It was announced on 19 March 2015 that self-governance for the island would be revoked by the Commonwealth and replaced by a local council with the state of New South Wales providing services to the island. A reason given was that the island had never gained self-sufficiency and was being heavily subsidised by the Commonwealth, being given $12.5 million in 2015 alone. It meant that residents would have to start paying Australian income tax, but they would also be covered by Australian welfare schemes such as Centrelink and Medicare.

The Norfolk Island Legislative Assembly decided to hold a referendum on the proposal. On 8 May 2015, voters were asked if Norfolk Islanders should freely determine their political status and their economic, social and cultural development, and to "be consulted at referendum or plebiscite on the future model of governance for Norfolk Island before such changes are acted upon by the Australian parliament". 68% out of 912 voters voted in favour. The Norfolk Island Chief Minister, Lisle Snell, said that "the referendum results blow a hole in Canberra's assertion that the reforms introduced before the Australian Parliament that propose abolishing the Legislative Assembly and Norfolk Island Parliament were overwhelmingly supported by the people of Norfolk Island".

The Norfolk Island Legislation Amendment Act 2015 passed the Australian Parliament on 14 May 2015 (assented on 26 May 2015), abolishing self-government on Norfolk Island and transferring Norfolk Island into a council as part of New South Wales law.

Between 1 July 2016 and 1 January 2022, New South Wales provided state-based services. Since 1 January 2022, Queensland has provided state-based services directly for Norfolk Island.

The island's official capital is Kingston; it is, however, more a centre of government than a sizeable settlement. The largest settlement is at Burnt Pine.

The most important local holiday is Bounty Day, celebrated on 8 June, in memory of the arrival of the Pitcairn Islanders in 1856.

Local ordinances and acts apply on the island, where most laws are based on the Australian legal system. Australian common law applies when not covered by either Australian or Norfolk Island law. Suffrage is universal at age eighteen.

As a territory of Australia, Norfolk Island does not have diplomatic representation abroad, or within the territory, and is also not a participant in any international organisations, other than sporting organisations.

The flag is three vertical bands of green, white, and green with a large green Norfolk Island pine tree centred in the slightly wider white band.

The Norfolk Island Regional Council was established in July 2016 to govern the territory at the local level in line with local governments in mainland Australia.

=== Constitutional status ===
From 1788 until 1844, Norfolk Island was a part of the Colony of New South Wales. In 1844, it was severed from New South Wales and annexed to the Colony of Van Diemen's Land. With the demise of the third settlement and in contemplation that the inhabitants of Pitcairn Island would move to Norfolk Island, the Australian Waste Lands Act 1855 (Imp), gave the Queen in Council the power to "separate Norfolk Island from the Colony of Van Diemen's Land and to make such provision for the government of Norfolk Island as might seem expedient". In 1856, the Queen in Council ordered that Norfolk Island be a distinct and separate settlement, appointing the Governor of New South Wales to also be the Governor of Norfolk Island with "full power and authority to make laws for the order, peace, and good government" of the island. Under these arrangements Norfolk Island was effectively self-governing, Although Norfolk Island was a colony acquired by settlement, it was never within the British Settlements Act.

The constitutional status of Norfolk Island was revisited in 1894 when the British government appointed an inquiry into the administration of justice on the island. By this time, there had been steps in Australia towards federation including the 1891 constitutional convention. There was a correspondence between the Governor of Norfolk Island, the British colonial office and the Governor of New Zealand as to how the island should be governed and by whom. Even within New South Wales, it was felt that "the laws and system of government in the Colony of New South Wales would not prove suitable to the Island Community". In 1896, the Governor of New Zealand wrote "I am advised that, as far as my Ministers can ascertain, if any change is to take place in the government of Norfolk Island, the Islanders, while protesting against any change, would prefer to come under the control of New Zealand rather than that of New South Wales".

The British government decided not to annex Norfolk Island to the Colony of New South Wales and instead that the affairs of Norfolk Island would be administered by the Governor of New South Wales in that capacity rather than having a separate office as Governor of Norfolk Island. The order-in-council contemplated the future annexation of Norfolk Island to the Colony of NSW or to any federal body of which NSW form part. Norfolk Island was not a part of NSW and residents of Norfolk Island were not entitled to have their names placed on the NSW electoral roll. Norfolk Island was accepted as a territory of Australia, separate from any state, by the Norfolk Island Act 1913 (Cth), passed under the territories power, and made effective in 1914. Norfolk Island was given a limited form of self-government by the Norfolk Island Act 1979 (Cth).

There have been four challenges to the constitutional validity of the Australian Government's authority to administer Norfolk Island:

- In 1939, Samuel Hadley argued that the only valid laws in Norfolk Island were those made under the 1856 Order in Council and that all subsequent laws were invalid; his case was rejected by the High Court.
- In 1965, the Supreme Court of Norfolk Island rejected Henry Newbery's appeal against conviction for failing to apply to be enrolled to vote in Norfolk Island Council elections. He had argued that in 1857 Norfolk Island had a constitution and a legislature such that the Crown could not abolish the legislature nor place Norfolk Island under the authority of Australia. In the Supreme Court, Eggleston J considered the constitutional history of Norfolk Island and concluded that the Australian Waste Lands Act 1855 (Imp) authorised any form of government, representative or non-representative, and that this included placing Norfolk Island under the authority of Australia.
- As a result of the Australian Government's decision in 1972 to prevent Norfolk Island from being used as a tax haven, Berwick Ltd claimed to be resident in Norfolk Island but was convicted of failing to lodge a tax return. One of the arguments for Berwick Ltd was that Norfolk Island, as an external territory, was not part of Australia in the constitutional sense. In 1976, the High Court unanimously rejected this argument, approving the Newbery decision and holding that Norfolk Island was a part of Australia.
- In 2004 the Australian Government amended the Norfolk Island Act 1979 (Cth) to remove the right for non-Australian citizens to enrol and stand for election to the Legislative Assembly of Norfolk Island. The validity of the amendments was challenged in the High Court, arguing that as an external territory Norfolk Island was not part of Australia in the constitutional sense and that disenfranchising residents of Norfolk Island who were not Australian citizens was inconsistent with self-government. In 2007, the High Court of Australia rejected these arguments, again approving the Newbery decision and holding that Norfolk Island was part of Australia and that self-government did not require residency rather than citizenship to determine the entitlement to vote.

The Government of Australia thus holds that:

Norfolk Island has been an integral part of the Commonwealth of Australia since 1914, when it was accepted as an Australian territory under section 122 of the Constitution. The Island has no international status independent of Australia.

Much of the self-government under the 1979 legislation was repealed with effect from 2016. The reforms included, to the chagrin of some of the locals of Norfolk Island, a repeal of the preambular sections of the Act which originally were 3–4 pages recognising the particular circumstances in the history of Norfolk Island.

Consistent with the Australian position, the United Nations Decolonization Committee does not include Norfolk Island on its list of non-self-governing territories.

This legal position is disputed by some residents on the island. Some islanders claim that Norfolk Island was actually granted independence at the time Queen Victoria granted permission to Pitcairn Islanders to re-settle on the island.

Following reforms to the status of Norfolk Island, there were mass protests by the local population. In 2015, it was reported that Norfolk Island was taking its argument for self-governance to the United Nations. A campaign to preserve the island's autonomy was formed, named Norfolk's Choice. A formal petition was lodged with the United Nations by Geoffrey Robertson on behalf of the local population on 25 April 2016.

Various suggestions for retaining the island's self-government have been proposed. In 2006, a UK MP, Andrew Rosindell, raised the possibility of the island becoming a self-governing British Overseas Territory. In 2013, the island's last chief minister, Lisle Snell, suggested independence, to be supported by income from fishing, offshore banking and foreign aid.

The laws of Norfolk Island were in a transitional state, under the Norfolk Island Applied Laws Ordinance 2016 (Cth), from 2016 until 2018. Laws of New South Wales as applying in Norfolk Island were suspended (with five major exceptions, which the 2016 Ordinance itself amended) until the end of June 2018. From 1 July 2018, all laws of New South Wales apply in Norfolk Island and, as "applied laws", are subject to amendment, repeal or suspension by federal ordinance. The Local Government Act 1993 (NSW) has been amended for application to Norfolk Island.

=== Immigration and citizenship ===
The island was subject to separate immigration controls from the remainder of Australia. Before 1 July 2016, immigration to Norfolk Island, even by other Australian citizens was heavily restricted. In 2012, immigration controls were relaxed with the introduction of an Unrestricted Entry Permit for all Australian and New Zealand citizens upon arrival and the option to apply for residency; the only criteria were to pass a police check and be able to pay into the local health scheme. From 1 July 2016, the Australian migration system replaced the immigration arrangements previously maintained by the Norfolk Island Government. Holders of Australian visas who travelled to Norfolk Island would have departed the Australian Migration Zone before 1 July 2016. Unless they held a multiple-entry visa, the visa would have ceased; in which case they would require another visa to re-enter mainland Australia.

Australian citizens and residents from other parts of the nation now have an automatic right of residence on the island after meeting these criteria (Immigration (Amendment No. 2) Act 2012). Australian citizens can carry either a passport or a form of photo identification to travel to Norfolk Island. The Document of Identity, which is no longer issued, is also acceptable within its validity period. Citizens of all other nations must carry a passport to travel to Norfolk Island even if arriving from other parts of Australia.

Non-Australian citizens who are permanent residents of Norfolk Island may apply for Australian citizenship after meeting normal residence requirements and are eligible to take up residence in mainland Australia at any time through the use of a Confirmatory (Residence) visa (subclass 808). Children born on Norfolk Island are Australian citizens as specified by Australian nationality law.

=== Health care ===
Norfolk Island Hospital is the only medical centre on the island. Since 1 July 2016, medical treatment on Norfolk Island has been covered by Medicare and the Pharmaceutical Benefits Scheme as it is in Australia. Emergency medical treatment is covered by Medicare or a private health insurer. Although the hospital can perform minor surgery, serious medical conditions are not permitted to be treated on the island and patients are flown back to mainland Australia. Air charter transport can cost as much as A$30,000, which is covered by the Australian Government. For serious emergencies, medical evacuations were provided by the Royal Australian Air Force; currently this service is provided by Australian Retrieval Services. The island has one ambulance, staffed by one employed St John Officer and a group of St John Ambulance Australia volunteers.

The lack of medical facilities available in most remote communities has a major impact on the health care of Norfolk Islanders. As is consistent with other extremely remote regions, many older residents move to New Zealand or Australia to access the required medical care.

=== Defence and law enforcement ===
Defence is the responsibility of the Australian Defence Force. There are no active military installations or defence personnel on Norfolk Island. The Administrator may request the assistance of the Australian Defence Force if required. As part of "Operation Resolute", the Royal Australian Navy and Australian Border Force deploy Cape and Armidale-class patrol boats to carry out civil maritime security operations in Australian mainland and offshore territories including Norfolk Island, the Heard Island and McDonald Islands, Christmas Island, the Cocos (Keeling) Islands, Macquarie Island, and Lord Howe Island. In part to carry out this mission, as of 2023, the Navy's Armidale-class boats are in the process of being replaced by larger Arafura-class offshore patrol vessels.

In 2023, Australian and American forces conducted joint military exercises in the vicinity of Norfolk Island signifying the island's potential as a staging base for peacekeeping, disaster-relief and other operations in the South Pacific.

Civilian law enforcement and community policing are provided by the Australian Federal Police. The normal deployment to the island is one sergeant and two constables. These are augmented by five local Special Members who have police powers but are not AFP employees.

=== Courts ===
The Norfolk Island Court of Petty Sessions is the equivalent of a Magistrates Court and deals with minor criminal, civil or regulatory matters. The Chief Magistrate of Norfolk Island is usually the current Chief Magistrate of the Australian Capital Territory. Three local Justices of the Peace have the powers of a Magistrate to deal with minor matters.

The Supreme Court of Norfolk Island deals with more serious criminal offences, more complex civil matters, administration of deceased estates and federal laws as they apply to the Territory. The Judges of the Supreme Court of Norfolk Island are generally appointed from among Justices of the Federal Court of Australia and may sit on the Australian mainland or convene a circuit court. Appeals are to the Federal Court of Australia.

As stated by the Legal Profession Act 1993, "a resident practitioner must hold a Norfolk Island practising certificate." As of 2014, only one lawyer maintained a full-time legal practice on Norfolk Island.

=== Census ===
Until 2016, Norfolk Island took its own censuses, separate from those taken by the Australian Bureau of Statistics for the remainder of Australia.

=== Postal service ===
Prior to 2016, the Norfolk Island Postal Service was responsible for mail receipt and delivery on the island and issued its own postage stamps. With the merger of Norfolk Island as a regional council, the Norfolk Island Postal Service ceased to exist and all postage is now handled by Australia Post. Australia Post sends and receives mail from Norfolk Island with the postcode 2899.

== Economy and infrastructure ==
Exports of Norfolk Island by product category (2019) Chemical products Transportation Machines Mineral products Plastics and rubbers Metals Foodstuffs Precious metals Textiles Instruments Animal products Vegetable products Paper goods Footwear and headwear Miscellaneous Stone and glass Wood products Animal and vegetable bi-products Animal hides Arts and antiques Weapons

Tourism, the primary economic activity, has steadily increased over the years. As Norfolk Island prohibits the importation of fresh fruit and vegetables, most produce is grown locally. Beef is both produced locally and imported. The island has one winery, Two Chimneys Wines.

The Australian government controls the exclusive economic zone (EEZ) and revenue from it extending 200 nautical miles (370 km) around Norfolk Island equating to roughly 428,000 km^{2} (165,000 sq mi), and territorial sea claims to 3 nautical miles (5.6 km) from the island. There is a strong belief on the island that some of the revenue generated from Norfolk's EEZ should be available to provide services such as health and infrastructure on the island, which the island has been responsible for, similar to how the Northern Territory is able to access revenue from their mineral resources. The exclusive economic zone provides the Islanders with fish, its only major natural resource. Norfolk Island has no direct control over any marine areas but has an agreement with the Commonwealth through the Australian Fisheries Management Authority (AFMA) to fish "recreationally" in a small section of the EEZ known locally as "the Box". While there is speculation that the zone may include oil and gas deposits, this is not proven. There are no major arable lands or permanent farmlands, though about 25 percent of the island is a permanent pasture. There is no irrigated land. The island uses the Australian dollar as its currency.

In 2015, Australian cannabis industry company AusCann was granted a licence to grow and export medicinal cannabis in Norfolk Island. The medicinal cannabis industry has been viewed by some as a means of reinvigorating the economy of Norfolk Island. The Commonwealth stepped in to overturn the decision, with the island's administrator, former Liberal MP Gary Hardgrave revoking the local licence to grow the crop. (Legislation to allow the cultivation of cannabis in Australia for medical or scientific purposes passed Federal Parliament in February 2016. The Victorian Government will be undertaking a small-scale, strictly controlled cannabis cultivation trial at a Victorian research facility.)

=== Taxes ===
Formerly, residents of Norfolk Island did not pay Australian federal taxes, which created a tax haven for locals and visitors alike. There was no income tax so the island's legislative assembly raised money through an import duty, fuel levy, medicare levy, goods and services tax of 12%, and local/international phone calls. The Chief Minister of Norfolk Island, David Buffett, announced on 6 November 2010 that the island would voluntarily surrender its tax-free status in return for a financial bailout from the federal government to cover significant debts. The introduction of income taxation came into effect on 1 July 2016. Prior to these reforms, residents of Norfolk Island were not entitled to social services. The reforms extend to private persons, companies and trustees.

=== Communications ===
As of 2004, 2532 telephone main lines were in use, a mix of analog (2500) and digital (32) circuits. Satellite communications services are planned. The island has two locally based radio stations (Radio Norfolk), a government run station broadcasting on both AM and FM frequencies and an independent station 87.6 FM owned by the Bounty Museum Trust. Norfolk Island doesn't have its own dedicated ABC Local Radio station but the island is covered by ABC Western Plains which broadcasts on 95.9 FM from its studios in Dubbo in mainland Australia. Television signals were first reportedly seen on the island's only television set on 21 November 1963, with distant reception of ABN-2 Sydney by ham radio technician Ray Hoare. Since then, reception not only of ABC but also NZBC TV was possible, with its apex in the summer months, as the signals were propagated through the ionosphere. There is also one television station, Norfolk TV, featuring local programming, plus transmitters for Australian channels ABC, SBS, Nine (through Imparja Television) and Seven. The Internet country code top-level domain (ccTLD) is .nf. A small GSM (2G) mobile network operates on the island across three towers, however no data transmission is available on this network. An eight-tower 4G/LTE 1800 MHz network was installed in November 2018, improving data service significantly on the island.

=== Transport ===
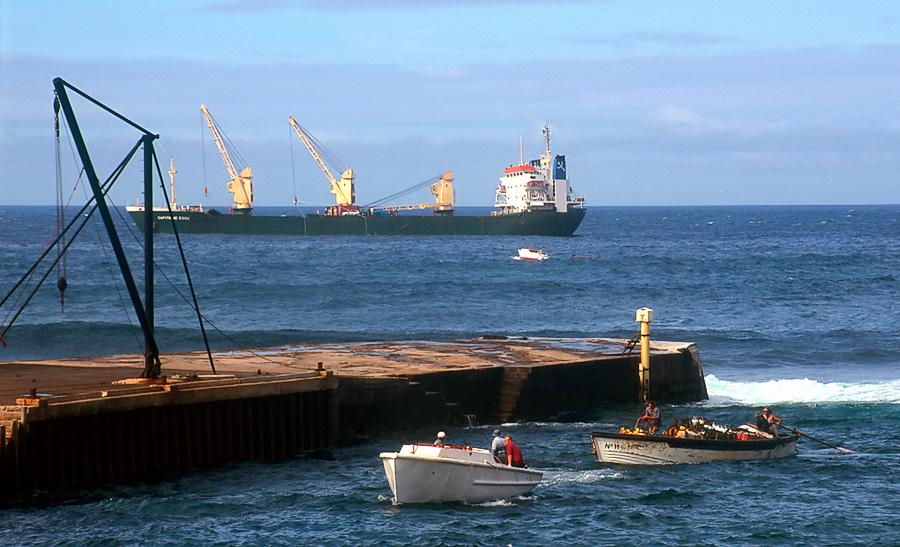
Jetty at Kingston, Norfolk Island

There are no railways, waterways, ports or harbours on the island. Loading jetties are located at Kingston and Cascade, but ships cannot get close to either of them. When a supply ship arrives, it is emptied by whaleboats towed by launches, five tonnes at a time. A mobile crane picks up the freight using nets and straps and lifts the freight onto the pier. Which jetty is used depends on the prevailing weather of the day; the jetty on the leeward side of the island is often used. If the wind changes significantly during unloading/loading, the ship will move around to the other side. Visitors often gather to watch the activity when a supply ship arrives. Norfolk Forwarding Services is the primary Freight Forwarding service for Norfolk Island handling both sea and airfreight. In 2017 Norfolk Forwarding Services shipped most of the freight for the Cascade Pier Project over a period of 18 months.

The island hosts 80 kilometres (50 mi) of roads, of which 53 km (33 mi) are paved and 27 km (17 mi) unpaved. As with the rest of Australia, driving is on the left side of the road. Uniquely, local law gives livestock right of way. Speed limits are lower than most mainland Australian roads; the general speed limit is 50 km/h (31 mph), reducing to 40 km/h (25 mph) in town and 30 km/h (19 mph) near schools. Drivers on the island wave to other passing vehicles, this tradition is nicknamed the "Norfolk wave".

There is one airport, Norfolk Island Airport. Qantas operates direct flights to Sydney and Brisbane, and Air Chathams flies to Auckland. A local airline, Norfolk Island Airlines, ran flights to Auckland and Brisbane until 2018. In mid 2018, Air Chathams announced it was looking to re-establish flights between Auckland and Norfolk Island. It began a weekly service between Auckland and Norfolk Island on 6 September 2019 using a Convair 580. Since the reopening of the Trans-Tasman bubble in 2021, the Air Chathams Auckland service operates on Thursdays using a 36-seater Saab 340 aircraft.

=== Electricity ===
Electricity is provided by diesel generators operated by Norfolk Island Electricity, a government organisation. Some electricity is also provided by privately owned rooftop solar panels.

== Sport ==
Norfolk Island competes at the Commonwealth Games, and has won three bronze medals, all in lawn bowls. The territory also competes in the Pacific Games and Pacific Mini Games and even hosted the sixth edition of the Mini Games in 2001.

The island supports national rugby league, cricket and netball teams. It is a member of World Athletics.

As of 2016, association football is not widely played on Norfolk Island, according to Norfolk Islands Amateur Sports & Commonwealth Games Association General Secretary Milton Bradley. In 2017, Athletics Norfolk Island general manager Geoff Gardner stated that the sport had been played on the island for many years, but is irregular and unstructured. Despite being popular with school students, the overall population is ageing and tends to prefer other sports. In a 1983, local Dem Tull newspaper described "soccer" as a new team sport on the island as a senior league was organized by Neil Hermes and Peter Wood. In total, eight clubs competed in the league's inaugural season: Deli Delights, All Stars, Veterans, Frogs, Tigers, Gold, Raiders, and Giants with all matches being played at the Kensington Oval in Kingston. Deli Delights were the eventual champions that season, defeating All Stars 1–0 in the grand final. Youth football was also organized by the local football association that year.

== See also ==
- Bibliography of Norfolk Island
- List of islands of Australia
- List of volcanoes in Australia
- Outline of Norfolk Island
