= Norfolk Islanders =

Inhabitants or citizens of Norfolk Island

Norfuk Aileners

Total population
- 347 or 15.9% claimed to be Norfolk Island-born out of a total population of 2,188 (2021 census) (usual resident pop) (Note: It is likely that the total is higher.)

Regions with significant populations
- Norfolk Island: Over 347
- Australia (mainland): 315
- New Zealand: 108 (2018)
- United States: 99
- California: 94
- United Kingdom: 89

Languages
- English; Norfuk / Norf'k; Fijian

Religion
- Christianity (68.5%): Anglican; Catholic; Uniting Church; Irreligion

Related ethnic groups
- Descendants of the Bounty mutineers; Pitcairn Islanders

Norfolk Islanders (Pitcairn-Norfolk: Norf'k Ailenas), also referred to as just Islanders, are the inhabitants or residents of Norfolk Island, an external territory of Australia. The Islanders have their own unique identity and are predominantly people of Pitcairn and English descent and to a lesser extent of Scottish and Irish.

The culture held in common by most native-born Norfolk Islanders is mainstream Norfolk culture, traditions primarily inherited from the 194 Pitcairn settlers in 1856. All of the people that claim Pitcairn ancestry are descended from the British HMS Bounty mutineers and their Tahitian companions.

In the 2021 census, there were 347 residents out of a total of 2,188 inhabiting the island who claimed they were born on Norfolk Island, a decrease over the 2016 census, though this is likely lower than the actual total. In the 2021 census, 25.1% of the island's population claimed Pitcairn heritage while 14.6% claimed "Norfolk Islander" heritage.

There is a Norfolk Islander diaspora in Australia, New Zealand and other nations due to people having relocated temporarily or migrated permanently.

== History ==
=== Discovery and name ===
Archaeological findings suggest that the island had previously been used as a settlement for seafaring Polynesians. The final fate of the early settlers remains a mystery.

The first European known to have sighted and landed on the island was Captain James Cook, on his second voyage on HMS Resolution. From New Caledonia to New Zealand Cook came across the island on 10 October 1774. Finding the island uninhabited, Cook claimed it for Britain and named it after English noblewoman Mary Howard, Duchess of Norfolk.

=== British settlement ===
In 1786 the British government included Norfolk Island as an auxiliary settlement, proposed by Sir John Call. When the First Fleet arrived at Port Jackson in January 1788, its commander, Captain Arthur Phillip, ordered Lieutenant Philip Gidley King to take control of the island and prepare for its commercial development. King arrived there on 6 March 1788 on board HMS Supply.

Norfolk King was born 8 January 1789 on Norfolk Island. He was the first child born on Norfolk Island. He left with his parents on aboard HMS Supply in March 1790, his name was recorded as "Norfolk King Inett" in the shipping muster. His parents were Lieutenant Phillip Gidley King and female convict Ann Inett. By 1814 the first penal settlement lay abandoned, until on 6 June 1825 a second penal settlement was established by Captain Richard Turton; it lasted until 1855. The town of New Norfolk, Tasmania was established with the evacuation of Norfolk Island in 1807–1808, named after their former home.

== Pitcairn settlers ==
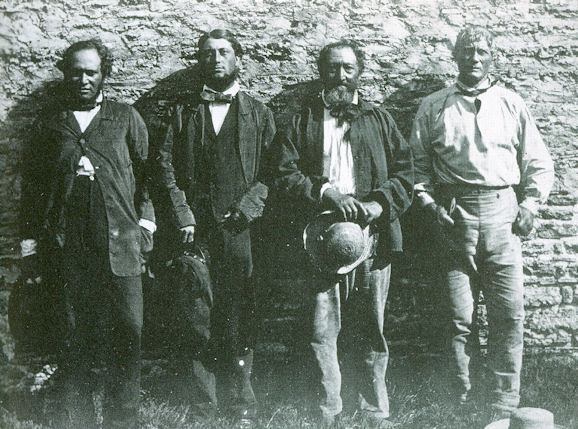
Pitcairn men of Norfolk Island 1861.

In 1855, the British Government offered by Queen Victoria gave another choice to the Pitcairn community. Norfolk Island's dreadful second penal settlement had been disbanded and the island was handed by an Imperial Order-In-Council of June 1856, to the people of Pitcairn as a permanent home. On 3 May 1856, the entire population of 193 (plus a baby (Reuben Denison Christian) born en route; making it 194) along with everything they owned began the five-week voyage aboard the Morayshire to Norfolk Island, arriving on 8 June 1856. These were the descendants of Tahitians and the HMS Bounty mutineers, resettled from the Pitcairn Islands, which had become too small for their growing population. The British government had permitted the transfer of the Pitcairners to Norfolk, which was thus established as a colony separate from New South Wales but under the administration of that colony's governor.

The Pitcairners occupied many of the buildings remaining from the penal settlements, and gradually established their traditional farming and whaling industries on the island. Although some families decided to return, with 17 members of the Young family to Pitcairn in 1858 and 1863, the island's population continued to slowly grow as the island accepted settlers, often arriving with whaling fleets.

=== Pitcairn descent ===
In the 2016 census, the question asked was – What is the person's ancestry?, different to previous censuses by the Norfolk Island government. Those who gave a response to the ancestry question showed that 29.6% of the 'usual residents' population had Pitcairn ancestry. When broken down as a total ancestry response, there were 484 or 20.0% of all ancestries reported identified as having Pitcairn ancestry. Out of the 53.7% of usual residents population who chose just a single ancestry, 14.8% identified as only 'Pitcairn' and 12.4% were part-Pitcairn plus another ancestry.

Distribution of 'Ordinarily Resident' population
Census	Percent
	33.2%
1986	66.2%
	0.6%
	38.4%
2011	60.8%
	0.8%
2016	29.6%
Yes, of Pitcairn Descent No, not of Pitcairn Descent; Not Stated, Pitcairn ancestry (2016)

An additional 120 people (7 percent of usual residents) chose 'Norfolk Island' ancestry with 30 identified as having Pitcairn descent. The 2011 census (Norfolk Island government) asked a question relating to Pitcairn descent with the questions – "yes, of Pitcairn descent" and "no, not of Pitcairn descent" only of the "Ordinarily Resident Population". People of Pitcairn descent may have relocated temporarily or migrated which is a possible factor in the increased number of persons of other descent. Norfolk's Pitcairn descendants are already at least 7th or 8th generation, and those in younger age groups are probably 9th generation.

==== Surnames ====
Among the Islanders, the descendants of the Pitcairners share only a few family names: Adams, Christian, McCoy, Quintal, and Young are the "Bounty mutineer names"; Buffett, Evans, and Nobbs are "Pitcairn names" – descended from the two Englishmen and one Welshman who married into the mutineer families on Pitcairn; and Blucher, Bataille, Robinson, Snell, Rossiter, and Bailey are among the "Norfolk names".

=== Transfer of territory ===
The Norfolk Island Act 1913 established Norfolk Island as a territory under the authority of the Commonwealth of Australia, transferring the territory from the British crown in July 1914.

== Demographics ==
=== Birthplace ===
In the 2016 census, native-born Norfolk Islanders were 22.1% of the total population. Table shows the most recent 2016 census data of the population by birthplace. Immigration flow from mainland Australia and New Zealand has been a substantial proportion of the population throughout the 20th century to the present-day. Those born in Norfolk Island have been in steady decline since the 1947 census where they formed a majority of 52% of the total population.

Birthplace	2016			
Birthplace	Males	Females	Persons	Percent
Norfolk Island			381	22.1%
Australia	–	–	685	39.7%
New Zealand	–	–	303	17.6%
Fiji	–	-	47	2.7%
England	–	-	45	2.6%
Philippines	–	–	40	2.3%
Total	818	930	1,748	100.0%

=== Age ===
2016 Census age distribution
Age range	Number	Percentage
0–4 years	84	4.8%
5–9 years	104	6.0%
10–14 years	106	6.1%
15–19 years	76	4.4%
20–24 years	31	1.8%
25–29 years	53	3.1%
30–34 years	68	3.9%
35–39 years	106	6.1%
40–44 years	116	6.7%
45–49 years	128	7.4%
50–54 years	143	8.2%
55–59 years	157	9.0%
60–64 years	151	8.7%
65–69 years	142	8.2%
70–74 years	107	6.2%
75–79 years	77	4.4%
80–84 years	43	2.5%
85 years and over	45	2.6%
Median age 49
Source: Bureau of Statistics

The median age of people in Norfolk Island (State Suburbs) was 49 years. Children aged 0–14 years made up 16.9% of the population and people aged 65 years and over made up 23.8% of the population.

== Language ==
English and Norfuk are the official languages. In 2004 an act of the Norfolk Island Assembly made Norfuk a co-official language of the island. In Norfolk Island (State Suburbs), 45.5% of people only spoke English, while 40.9% spoke Norf'k-Pitcairn at home originally introduced by Pitkern-speaking settlers.
2016 census:

- English (only spoken at home) 789 (45.5%)
- Norf'k-Pitcairn – 709 (40.9%)
- Fijian – 35 (2.0%)
- Filipino/Tagalog – 32 (1.8%)
- Mandarin – 12 (0.7%)

== Culture ==
Bounty Day is a national holiday primarily celebrated by islanders of Pitcairn heritage on 8 June, held in the World Heritage area of Kingston, the day that the descendants of the mutineers arrived on the island. The Islander's re-enact the landing of the Pitcairners on the island and is named for the ship HMS Bounty. Another celebration is Thanksgiving held on the last Wednesday of November, similar to the pre–World War II American observance on the last Thursday of the month. This means the Norfolk Island observance is the day before or six days after the United States' observance. The holiday was brought to the island by visiting American whaling ships.

=== Religion ===
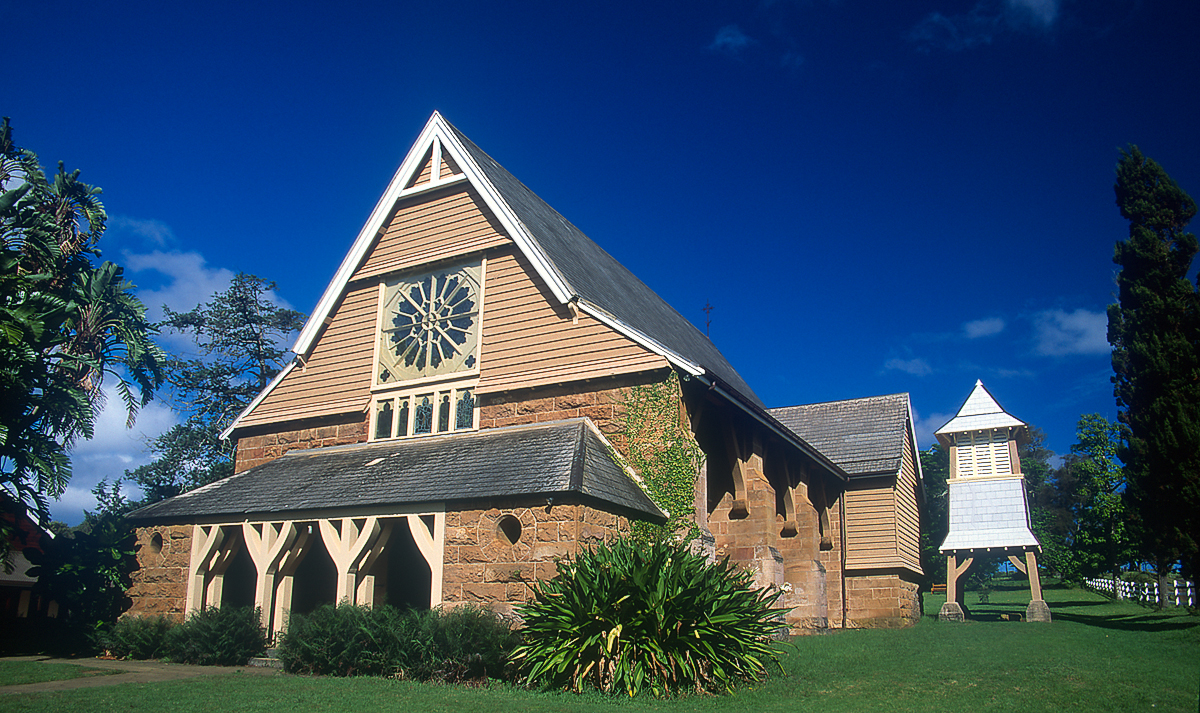
St. Barnabas Chapel: Church of England on Norfolk Island completed in 1880.

The most common religious affiliation in Norfolk Island (State Suburbs) were Anglican 29.5%, No Religion, so described 26.8%, Catholic 12.6%, Uniting Church 9.6% and Not stated 9.6%. In Norfolk Island (State Suburbs), Christianity was the largest religious group reported overall (68.5%) (this figure excludes not stated responses).

Religious affiliation	2016 census	
Religious affiliation	Number	Percentage
Christian		68.5%
Anglican	511	29.5%
Roman Catholic	218	12.6%
Uniting Church	167	9.6%
No Religion, so described	465	26.8%
Not stated	166	9.6%
Total	1,748	100.0%
Source: ABS

=== Sport ===
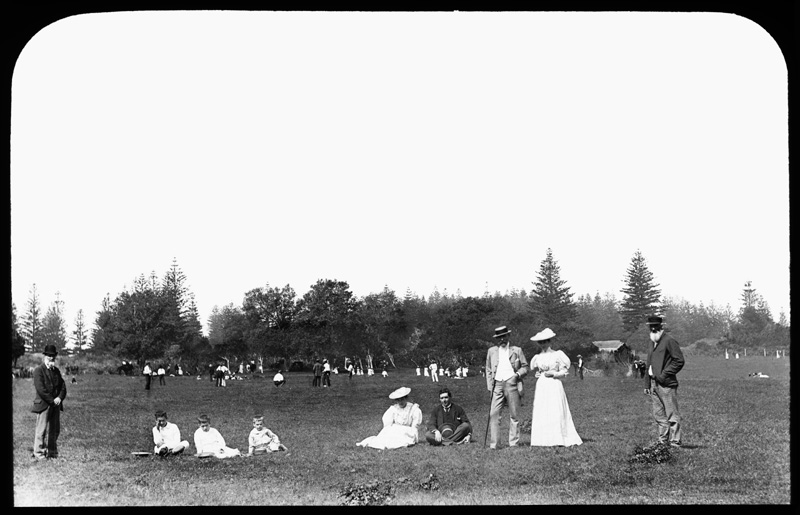
Norfolk Islanders gathering at a cricket match in November 1908.

Cricket is recorded as having been played on Norfolk Island, an external territory of Australia, as early as 1838, by soldiers stationed on the island. It continued to be played after the island was settled in 1856 by Pitcairn settlers.

=== Cuisine ===
The cuisine of Norfolk Island is very similar to that of the Pitcairn Islands, as Norfolk Islanders trace their origins to Pitcairn. The local cuisine is a blend of British cuisine and Tahitian cuisine.

Recipes from Norfolk Island of Pitcairn origin include mudda (green banana dumplings) and kumara pilhi. The islands cuisine also contains American influences not found in Pitcairn, such as chopped salads and fruit pies, due to the influences of American whalers.

=== Museums ===
Norfolk Island Museum is an organisation that runs five heritage sites on the island, which are situated in the Kingston and Arthur's Vale Historic Area, a world heritage site associated with the Australian Convict Sites listing. The Bounty Folk Museum is a private museum displaying memorobilia associated with the Bounty settlers.

== Diaspora ==
=== New Zealand ===
According to the 2013 census, 96 people listed their birthplace as Norfolk Island. This increased to 108 people (usually resident population) born in Norfolk Island in 2018.

== Historical demographics ==
=== Population by birthplace: 1933 ===
The results below show the total population of the Island in the 1933 census by their place of birth, with a slight majority being Norfolk Island-born. Native Norfolk Islanders were over 53% of the population, 30% were mainland Australians and New Zealanders, with around 12% born in Europe.

Birthplace		1933		
Birthplace		Males	Females	Persons
(Norfolk Island)	Norfolk Island	326	325	651
(Australia)	Australia	105	83	188
(New Zealand)	New Zealand	113	76	189
Europe
(England)	England	66	40	106
(Scotland)	Scotland	12	11	23
(Wales)	Wales	1	1	2
Ireland		7	4	11
Channel Islands		1	0	1
Total, British Isles		87	56	143
Other countries in Europe		6	4	10
Asia
(British Raj)	British India	7	2	9
Other countries in Asia		1	0	1
Africa		2	0	2
Americas		2	3	5
Polynesia		12	19	31
	Fiji	7	8	15
Other British Possessions		3	2	5
(New Hebrides)	New Hebrides	2	9	11
Not stated		1	1	2
Total		662	569	1,231

== Notable people ==
Notable people from, or associated with Norfolk Island include:

- Philip Parker King
- Malcolm Champion
- Margaret and Frederick Jowett

=== Gallery ===
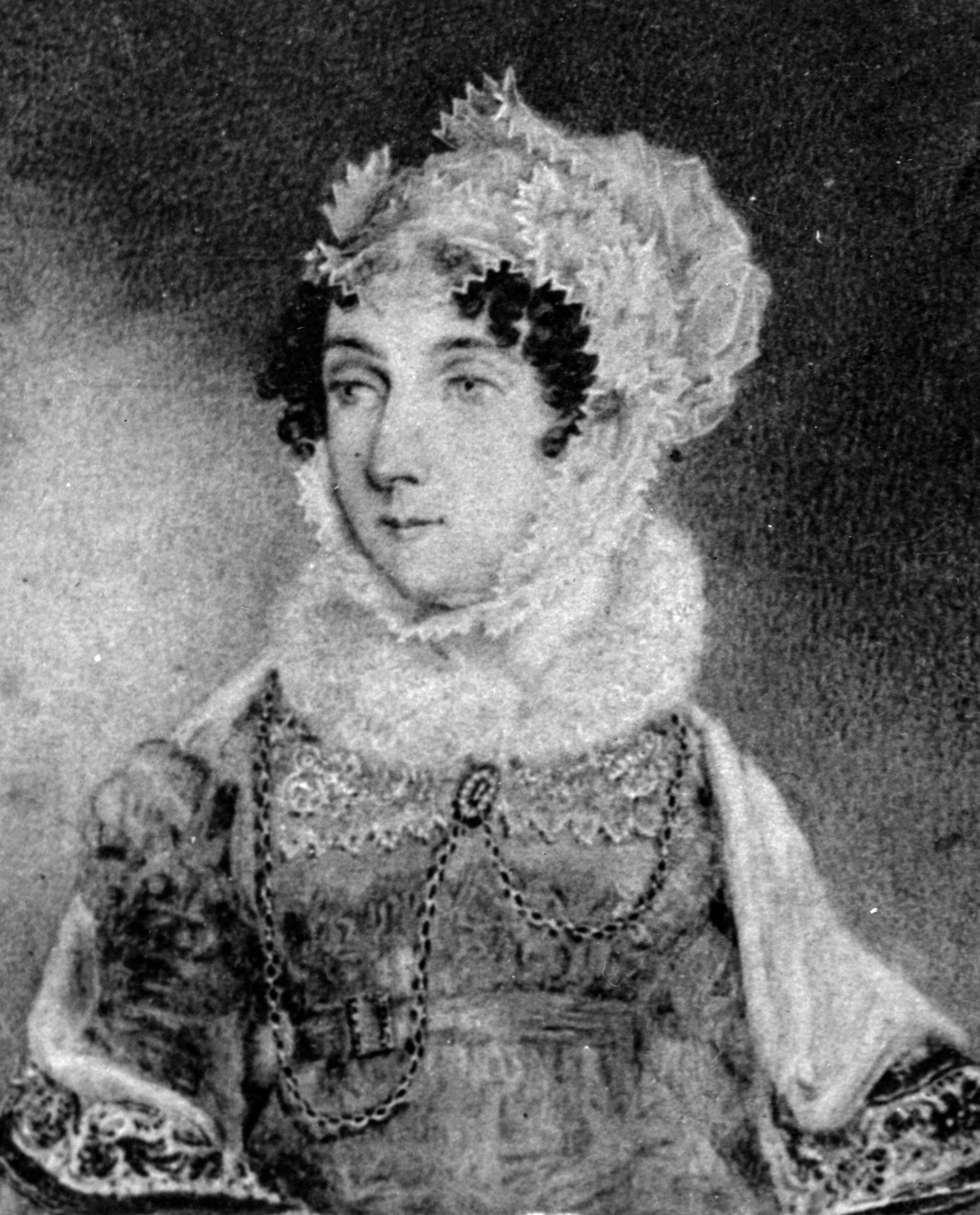
Anna Maria King, daughter of Philip Gidley King

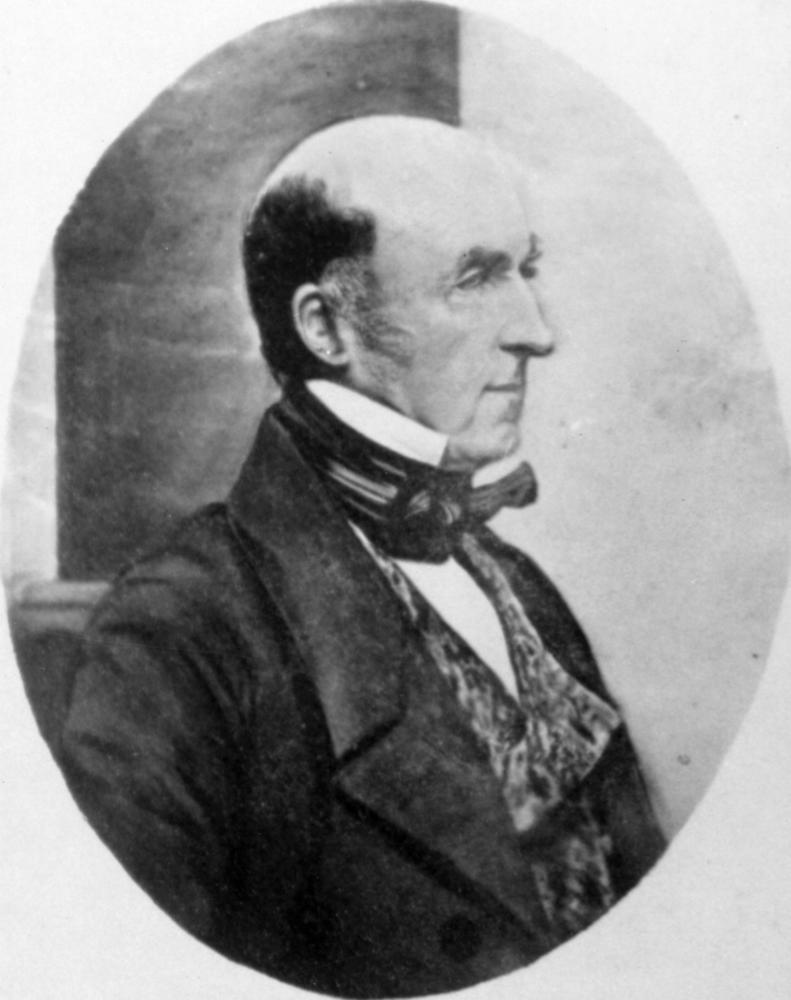
Phillip Parker King

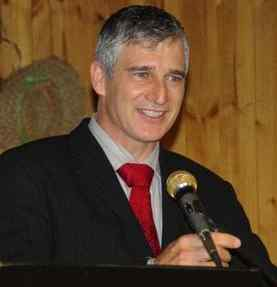
Andre Nobbs

== See also ==
- Descendants of the Bounty mutineers
- Europeans in Oceania
- List of Oceanian countries by population
- Pitcairn Islands
