= List of countries and dependencies and their capitals in native languages =

The following chart lists countries and dependencies along with their capital cities, in English and non-English official language(s).

- In bold: internationally recognized sovereign states
  - The 193 member states of the United Nations (UN)
  - Vatican City (administered by the Holy See, a UN observer state), which is generally recognized as a sovereign state
- In **bold italics**: states with limited recognition and associated states not members of the United Nations
  - De facto sovereign states with partial international recognition, such as Palestine, Kosovo and Taiwan
  - De facto sovereign states lacking general international recognition
  - Cook Islands and Niue, two associated states of New Zealand without UN membership
- In italics: non-sovereign territories that are recognized by the UN as part of some member state
  - Dependent territories
  - Special territories recognized by international treaty (such as the special administrative regions of China)
  - Other territories often regarded as separate geographical territories even though they are integral parts of their mother countries (such as the overseas departments of France)

== A ==
Country (exonym)	Capital (exonym)	Country (endonym)	Capital (endonym)	Official or native language(s) (alphabet/script)
**Afghanistan**	Kabul	**Afġānistān** افغانستان	**Kabul** كابل	Pashto/Dari (Arabic script)
**Albania**	Tirana	**Shqipëria**	**Tirana**	Albanian
**Algeria**	Algiers	**Dzayer** **ⴷⵣⴰⵢⴻⵔ**; **Al-Jazā'ir** الجزائر	**Dzayer** **ⴷⵣⴰⵢⴻⵔ**; **Al-Jazā'ir** الجزائر	Berber language (Tifinagh script); Arabic (Arabic script)
American Samoa	Pago Pago	**Amerika Sāmoa**; **American Samoa**	**Pago Pago**; **Pago Pago**	Samoan; English
**Andorra**	Andorra la Vella	**Andorra**	**Andorra la Vella**	Catalan
**Angola**	Luanda	**Angola**; **Ngola**	**Luanda**; **Lwanda**	Portuguese; Kongo
Anguilla	The Valley	**Anguilla**	**The Valley**	English
**Antigua and Barbuda**	Saint John's	**Aanteega an' Baabyuuda**; **Antigua and Barbuda**	**Sen Jaan**; **St. John's**	Antiguan and Barbudan Creole; English
**Argentina**	Buenos Aires	**Argentina**	**Buenos Aires**	Spanish
**Armenia**	Yerevan	**Hayastán**; Հայաստան	**Yerevan**; Երևան	Armenian (Armenian alphabet)
Aruba	Oranjestad	**Aruba**	**Oranjestad**	Dutch, Papiamento
**Australia**	Canberra	**Australia**	**Canberra**	English/Aboriginal languages
**Austria**	Vienna	**Österreich**	**Wien**	German
Åland	Mariehamn	**Åland**; **Ahvenanmaa**	**Mariehamn**; **Maarianhamina**	Swedish; Finnish
**Azerbaijan**	Baku	**Azərbaycan**	**Bakı**	Azerbaijani

== B ==
Country (exonym)	Capital (exonym)	Country (endonym)	Capital (endonym)	Official or native language(s) (alphabet/script)
**The Bahamas**	Nassau	**The Bahamas**	**Nassau**	English
**Bahrain**	Manama	**Al-Baḥrayn** البحرين	**Al-Manāmah** المنامة	Arabic (Arabic script)
**Bangladesh**	Dhaka	**Bānglādesh** বাংলাদেশ	**Dhākā** ঢাকা	Bengali (Bengali script)
**Barbados**	Bridgetown	**Barbados**	**Bridgetown**	English
**Belarus**	Minsk	**Bielaruś**; Беларусь; **Belarus**; Беларусь	**Minsk**; Мінск; **Minsk**; Минск	Belarusian (Cyrillic script); Russian (Cyrillic script)
**Belgium**	Brussels	**België**; **Belgique**; **Belgien**	**Brussel**; **Bruxelles**; **Brüssel**	Dutch; French; German
**Belize**	Belmopan	**Belize**	**Belmopan**	English
**Benin**	Porto-Novo	**Bénin**	**Porto-Novo**	French
Bermuda	Hamilton	**Bermuda**	**Hamilton**	English
**Bhutan**	Thimphu	**Druk Yul** འབྲུག་ཡུལ	**Thimphu** ཐིམ་ཕུ	Dzongkha (Tibetan alphabet)
**Bolivia**	La Paz	**Bolivia**; **Buliwya**; **Wuliwya**; **Volívia**	**La Paz**; **Chuqiyapu**; **Chuqiyapu**; **La Paz**	Spanish; Quechua; Aymara; Guaraní
Bonaire	Kralendijk	**Bonaire**	**Boneiru**	Dutch
**Bosnia and Herzegovina**	Sarajevo	**Bosna i Hercegovina**; Босна и Херцеговина	**Sarajevo**; Сарајево	Bosnian, Croatian (Latin script); Serbian (Cyrillic script)
**Botswana**	Gaborone	**Botswana**	**Gaborone**	English, Tswana
**Brazil**	Brasília	**Brasil**	**Brasília**	Portuguese
British Virgin Islands	Road Town	**British Virgin Islands**	**Road Town**	English
**Brunei**	Bandar Seri Begawan	**Brunei** بروني	**Bandar Seri Begawan** or **Bandar** باندر سري بڬاون	Malay (Jawi script)
**Bulgaria**	Sofia	**Bălgariya** or **Bălgarija**; България	**Sofiya** or **Sofija**; София	Bulgarian (Cyrillic script)
**Burkina Faso**	Ouagadougou	**Burkina Faso**	**Ouagadougou**	French
**Burundi**	Gitega	**Uburundi**; **Burundi**	**Gitega**; **Gitega**	Kirundi; French

== C ==
Country (exonym)	Capital (exonym)	Country (endonym)	Capital (endonym)	Official or native language(s) (alphabet/script)
**Cambodia**	Phnom Penh	**Kămpŭchéa** កម្ពុជា	**Phnum Pénh** ភ្នំពេញ	Khmer (Khmer script)
**Cameroon**	Yaoundé	**Cameroun**; **Cameroon**	**Yaoundé**; **Yaoundé**	French; English
**Canada**	Ottawa	**Canada**	**Ottawa**	English, French
**Cape Verde**	Praia	**Cabo Verde**	**Praia**	Portuguese
Cayman Islands	George Town	**Cayman Islands**	**George Town**	English
**Central African Republic**	Bangui	**Centrafrique**; **Bêafrîka**	**Bangui**; **Bangî**	French; Sango
**Chad**	N'Djamena	**Tchad**; **Tšād** تشاد	**Ndjamena**; **Nijāmīnā** نجامينا	French; Arabic (Arabic script)
**Chile**	Santiago	**Chile**	**Santiago**	Spanish
**China (People's Republic of)**	Beijing	**Zhōngguó** (Zhōnghuá Rénmín Gònghéguó) 中国 (中华人民共和国)	**Běijīng** 北京	Mandarin Chinese (Chinese characters)
Christmas Island	Flying Fish Cove	**Christmas Island**	**Flying Fish Cove**	English
Cocos Islands	West Island	**Cocos Islands**	**West Island**	English
**Colombia**	Bogotá	**Colombia**	**Bogotá**	Spanish
**Comoros**	Moroni	**Komori**; **Juzur al-Qumur** جزر القمر; **Comores**	**Moroni**; **Moroni** موروني; **Moroni**	Shikomor; Arabic (Arabic script); French
**Republic of the Congo**	Brazzaville	**République du Congo**; **Repubilika ya Kôngo**; **Republíki ya Kongó**	**Brazzaville**; **Balazavile**; **Brazzaville**	French; Kongo; Lingala
**Democratic Republic of the Congo**	Kinshasa	**République démocratique du Congo**; **Republíki ya Kongó Demokratíki**; **Repubilika ya Kôngo ya Dimokalasi**; **Jamhuri ya Kidemokrasia ya Kongo**	**Kinshasa**; **Kinsasa**; **Kinsásá**; **Kinshasa**	French; Kongo; Lingala; Swahili
**Cook Islands**	Avarua	**Cook Islands**; **Kūki 'Āirani**	**Avarua**; **Avarua**	English; Cook Islands Māori
**Costa Rica**	San José	**Costa Rica**	**San José**	Spanish
**Croatia**	Zagreb	**Hrvatska**	**Zagreb**	Croatian
**Cuba**	Havana	**Cuba**	**La Habana**	Spanish
Curaçao	Willemstad	**Curaçao**; **Kòrsou**; **Curaçao**	**Willemstad**; **Willemstad**; **Willemstad**	Dutch; Papiamento; English
**Cyprus**	Nicosia	**Kypros**; Κύπρος; **Kıbrıs**	**Lefkosia**; Λευκωσία; **Lefkoşa**	Greek (Greek alphabet); Turkish
**Czech Republic**	Prague	**Česká republika** **Česko**	**Praha**	Czech

== D ==
Country (exonym)	Capital (exonym)	Country (endonym)	Capital (endonym)	Official or native language(s) (alphabet/script)
**Denmark**	Copenhagen	**Danmark**	**København**	Danish
**Djibouti**	Djibouti	**Jībūtī** جيبوتي; **Djibouti**; **Jabuuti**; **Gabuuti**	**Jībūtī** جيبوتي; **Djibouti**; **Jabuuti**; **Gabuuti**	Arabic (Arabic script); French; Somali; Afar
**Dominica**	Roseau	**Dominica**	**Roseau**	English
**Dominican Republic**	Santo Domingo	**República Dominicana**	**Santo Domingo**	Spanish

== E ==
Country (exonym)	Capital (exonym)	Country (endonym)	Capital (endonym)	Official or native language(s) (alphabet/script)
**East Timor**	Díli	**Timor Lorosa'e**; **Timor-Leste**	**Díli**; **Díli**	Tetum; Portuguese
**Ecuador**	Quito	**Ecuador**	**Quito**	Spanish
**Egypt**	Cairo	**Misr** or **Masr** مصر	**Al-Qāhirah** القاهرة	Arabic (Arabic script)
**El Salvador**	San Salvador	**El Salvador**	**San Salvador**	Spanish
**Equatorial Guinea**	Malabo	**Guinea Ecuatorial**; **Guinée équatoriale** **Guiné Equatorial**	**Malabo**; **Malabo**; **Malabo**	Spanish; French; Portuguese
**Eritrea**	Asmara	**Iritriya** **إرتريا**; **Ertra** ኤርትራ	**Asmaraa** **أسمرا**; **Asmära** አሥመራ	Arabic (Arabic script); Tigrinya (Ge'ez script)
**Estonia**	Tallinn	**Eesti**	**Tallinn**	Estonian
**Eswatini** (formerly Swaziland)	Mbabane	**Eswatini** **eSwatini**	**Mbabane**; **Mbabane**	English; Swazi
**Ethiopia**	Addis Ababa	**Ityop'ia** ኢትዮጵያ	**Addis Abäba** አዲስ አበ	Amharic (Ge'ez script)

== F ==
Country (exonym)	Capital (exonym)	Country (endonym)	Capital (endonym)	Official or native language(s) (alphabet/script)
Falkland Islands	Stanley	**Falkland Islands**	**Stanley**	English
Faroe Islands	Tórshavn	**Føroyar**; **Færøerne**	**Tórshavn**; **Thorshavn**	Faroese; Danish
**Fiji**	Suva	**Fiji**; **Viti** **फ़िजी**	**Suva**; **Suva**; **Suva**	English; Fijian; Fiji Hindi
**Finland**	Helsinki	**Suomi**; **Finland**	**Helsinki**; **Helsingfors**	Finnish; Swedish
**France**	Paris	**France**	**Paris**	French
French Guiana	Cayenne	**Guyane**	**Cayenne**	French
French Polynesia	Papeete	**Polynésie française** **Pōrīnetia Farāni**	**Papeete**; **Papeʻete**	French; Tahitian

== G ==
Country (exonym)	Capital (exonym)	Country (endonym)	Capital (endonym)	Official or native language(s) (alphabet/script)
**Gabon**	Libreville	**Gabon**	**Libreville**	French
**The Gambia**	Banjul	**The Gambia**; **Kambiya** ߞߊߡߓߌߦߊ; **Gambi** 𞤘𞤢𞤥𞤦𞤭; **Gámbi**	**Banjul**; **Banjul** ߓߊ߲߬ߖߎߟ; **Bannjulu** 𞤄𞤢𞤲𞥆𞤶𞤵𞤤𞤵; **Banjul**	English; Mandinka; Pulaar; Wolof
**Georgia**	Tbilisi	**Sak'art'velo** საქართველო	**Tbilisi** თბილისი	Georgian (Georgian alphabet)
**Germany**	Berlin	**Deutschland**	**Berlin**	German
**Ghana**	Accra	**Ghana**; **Gaana**; **Gana**; **Gana**	**Accra**; **Nkran**; **Nkran**; **Accra**	English; Akan; Twi; Ewe
Gibraltar	Gibraltar	**Gibraltar**	**Gibraltar**	English
**Greece**	Athens	**Ellada**; Ελλάδα or **Hellas**; Ελλάς	**Athina**; Αθήνα or **Athinai**; Αθήναι	Greek (Greek alphabet)
Greenland	Nuuk	**Kalaallit Nunaat**; **Grønland**	**Nuuk**; **Godthåb**	Greenlandic; Danish
**Grenada**	St. George's	**Grenada**	**St. George's**	English
Guadeloupe	Basse-Terre	**Guadeloupe**	**Basse-Terre**	French
Guam	Hagåtña formerly Agaña	**Guam**; **Guåhån**	**Hagåtña**; **Hagåtña**	English; Chamorro
**Guatemala**	Guatemala City	**Guatemala**	**Ciudad de Guatemala**	Spanish
Guernsey	Saint Peter Port	**Guernsey**; **Guernési**	**Saint Peter Port**; **Saint Pierre Port**	English; Guernésiais
**Guinea**	Conakry	**Guinée**; **Gine** ߖߌ߬ߣߍ߫ **Gine** 𞤘𞤭𞤲𞤫	**Conakry**; **Kɔnakrí** ߞߐߣߊߞߙߌ߫ **Konaakiri** 𞤑𞤮𞤲𞤢𞥄𞤳𞤭𞤪𞤭	French; Maninka, Susu; Pular
**Guinea-Bissau**	Bissau	**Guiné-Bissau**; **Gine-Bisaawo** 𞤘𞤭𞤲𞤫 𞤄𞤭𞤧𞤢𞥄𞤱𞤮; **Gine-Bisawo** ߖߌ߬ߣߍ߫ ߓߌߛߊߥߏ߫	**Bissau**; **Bisaawo** 𞤄𞤭𞤧𞤢𞥄𞤱𞤮; **Bisawo** ߓߌߛߊߥߏ߫	Portuguese; Fula; Mandinka
**Guyana**	Georgetown	**Guyana**	**Georgetown**	English

== H ==
Country (exonym)	Capital (exonym)	Country (endonym)	Capital (endonym)	Official or native language(s) (alphabet/script)
**Haiti**	Port-au-Prince	**Haïti**; **Ayiti**	**Port-au-Prince**; **Pòtoprens**	French; Haitian Creole
**Honduras**	Tegucigalpa	**Honduras**	**Tegucigalpa**	Spanish
Hong Kong	Hong Kong	**Hong Kong**; **Heung Gong** 香港	**Hong Kong**; **Heung Gong** 香港	English; Cantonese (Traditional Chinese characters)
**Hungary**	Budapest	**Magyarország**	**Budapest**	Hungarian

== I ==
Country (exonym)	Capital (exonym)	Country (endonym)	Capital (endonym)	Official or native language(s) (alphabet/script)
**Iceland**	Reykjavík	**Ísland**	**Reykjavík**	Icelandic
**India**	New Delhi	**Bhārôt** ভাৰত; **Bhārôt** ভারত; **India**; **Bhārat** ભારત; **Bhārat** भारत; **Bhārata** ಭಾರತ; **Bhārat** भारत; **Bhāratam** ഭാരതം **Bhārat** भारत; **Bhārat** भारत; **Bhārata** ଭାରତ; **Bhārat** ਭਾਰਤ; **Bhāratam** भारतम् **Bāratam** பாரதம் **Bhāratadēśam** భారతదేశం	**Nôtun Dillī** নতুন দিল্লী **Nôtun Dillī** নতুন দিল্লী **New Delhi**; **Navī Dilhī** નવી દિલ્હી **Naī Dillī** नई दिल्ली **Navadehalī** ನವದೆಹಲಿ **Navī Dillī** नवी दिल्ली **Nyūḍalhi** ന്യൂഡല്ഹി **Navī Dillī** नवी दिल्ली **Nayã Dillī** नयाँ दिल्ली **Nūā Dillī** ନୂଆ ଦିଲ୍ଲୀ **Navĩ Dillī** ਨਵੀਂ ਦਿੱਲੀ **Navdillī** नवदिल्ली **Pududilli** புது தில்லி **Krottaḍhillī** క్రొత్తఢిల్లీ	Assamese (Assamese script); Bengali (Bengali script); English; Gujarati (Gujarati script); Hindi (Devanagari script); Kannada (Kannada script); Konkani (Devanagari script); Malayalam (Malayalam script); Marathi (Devanagari script); Nepali (Devanagari script); Odia (Odia script); Punjabi (Gurmukhi script); Sanskrit (Devanagari script); Tamil (Tamil script); Telugu (Telugu script)
**Indonesia**	Jakarta	**Indonesia**	**Jakarta**	Indonesian
**Iran**	Tehran	**Īrān** ایران	**Tehrān** تهران	Persian (Persian script)
**Iraq**	Baghdad	**Al-'Iraq** العراق; **Êraq** عێراق	**Baghdad** بغداد; **Bexda** بەغدا	Arabic (Arabic script); Kurdish
**Ireland**	Dublin	**Éire**; **Ireland**	**Baile Átha Cliath**; **Dublin**	Irish; English
Isle of Man	Douglas	**Isle of Man** or **Mann**; **Ellan Vannin** or **Mannin**	**Douglas**; **Doolish**	English; Manx
**Israel**	Jerusalem (declared) (Note: Jerusalem Law states that "Jerusalem, complete and united, is the capital of Israel", and the city serves as the seat of the government, home to the president's residence, government offices, supreme court, and parliament. United Nations Security Council Resolution 478 declared the Jerusalem Law "null and void" and called on member states to withdraw their diplomatic missions from Jerusalem. The United Nations and nearly all of its member states maintain their embassies in other cities such as Tel Aviv, Ramat Gan, and Herzliya, and do not recognise Jerusalem as the capital; however, in May 2018, the United States and Guatemala moved their official embassies to Jerusalem, and several other UN member states indicated that they were considering doing the same. Many countries officially adhere to the proposal that Jerusalem have international status, as called for in the Partition Plan of 1947. The Palestinian National Authority claims East Jerusalem as the capital of a future Palestinian state. See Positions on Jerusalem.)	**Yisra'el** ישראל; **Israʼiyl** إسرائيل	**Yerushalayim** ירושלים; **Al-Quds** القُدس	Hebrew (Hebrew script); Arabic (Arabic script)
**Italy**	Rome	**Italia**	**Roma**	Italian
**Ivory Coast**	Yamoussoukro	**Côte d'Ivoire**	**Yamoussoukro**	French

== J ==
Country (exonym)	Capital (exonym)	Country (endonym)	Capital (endonym)	Official or native language(s) (alphabet/script)
**Jamaica**	Kingston	**Jamaica**	**Kingston**	English
**Japan**	Tokyo	**Nihon**; **Nippon** 日本	**Tōkyō** 東京	Japanese (Japanese characters)
Jersey	St. Helier	**Jersey**; **Jersey**; **Jèrri**	**St. Helier**; **Saint Hélier**; **Saint Hélyi**	English; French; Jèrriais
**Jordan**	Amman	**Al-’Urdun** الأردن	**‘Ammān** عمان	Arabic (Arabic script)

== K ==
Country (exonym)	Capital (exonym)	Country (endonym)	Capital (endonym)	Official or native language(s) (alphabet/script)
Kazakhstan	Astana	**Qazaqstan**; Қазақстан; **Kazakhstán**; Казахстан	**Astana**; Астана; **Astana**; Астана	Kazakh (Cyrillic script); Russian (Cyrillic script)
Kenya	Nairobi	**Kenya**	**Nairobi**	English, Swahili
Kiribati	Tarawa	**Kiribati**	**Tarawa**	English, Gilbertese
North Korea	Pyongyang	**Chosŏn** as called in NK 조선 / 朝鮮; **Bukchosŏn** 북조선	**P'yŏngyang** 평양 / 平壌	Korean (Hangul/Hanja)
South Korea	Seoul	**Hanguk** as called in SK 한국 / 韓國; **Namhan** 남한	**Seoul** 서울	Korean (Hangul/Hanja)
Kosovo	Pristina	**Kosova**; **Kosovo**; **Косово**	**Prishtinë**; **Priština**; **Приштина**	Albanian; Serbian (Latin); Serbian (Cyrillic)
Kuwait	Kuwait City	**Dawlat ul-Kuwayt** دولة الكويت **il-ikwet** الكويت	**Madiinat ul-Kuwayt** مدينة الكويت **id-diira** الديرة	Arabic (Official) (Arabic script); Kuwaiti Gulf Arabic (native) (Arabic script)
Kyrgyzstan	Bishkek	**Kyrgyzstan**; Кыргызстан; **Kyrgyzstan**; Кыргызстан	**Bishkek**; Бишкек; **Bishkek**; Бишкек	Kyrgyz (Cyrillic script); Russian (Cyrillic script)

== L ==
Country (exonym)	Capital (exonym)	Country (endonym)	Capital (endonym)	Official or native language(s) (alphabet/script)
Laos	Vientiane	**Lao** ປະເທດລາວ	**Vientiane, Vieng Chan**, or **Wīang Chan** ວຽງຈັນ	Lao; Lao alphabet
Latvia	Riga	**Latvija**	**Rīga**	Latvian
Lebanon	Beirut	**Lubnān** لبنان; **Liban**	**Bayrūt** بيروت; **Beyrouth**	Arabic (Arabic script) French
Lesotho	Maseru	**Lesotho**	**Maseru**	Sesotho, English
Liberia	Monrovia	**Liberia**	**Monrovia**	English
Libya	Tripoli	**Libya** **ⵍⵉⴱⵢⴰ**; **Lībiyā** ليبيا	**Ṭrables** **ⵟⵔⴰⴱⵍⴻⵙ**; **Tarabulus** طرابلس	Berber language (Tifinagh script); Arabic (Arabic script)
Liechtenstein	Vaduz	**Liechtenstein**	**Vaduz**	German
Lithuania	Vilnius	**Lietuva**	**Vilnius**	Lithuanian
Luxembourg	Luxembourg	**Lëtzebuerg**; **Luxemburg**; **Luxembourg**	**Lëtzebuerg**; **Luxemburg**; **Luxembourg**	Luxembourgish; German; French

== M ==
Country (exonym)	Capital (exonym)	Country (endonym)	Capital (endonym)	Official or native language(s) (alphabet/script)
Macau	Macau	**Oumún** **澳門**; **Macau**	**Oumún** **澳門**; **Macau**	Cantonese (Traditional Chinese characters); Portuguese
**Madagascar**	Antananarivo	**Madagasikara**; **Madagascar**	**Antananarivo**; **Antananarivo/Tananarive**	Malagasy; French
**Malawi**	Lilongwe	**Malawi**; **Malaŵi**	**Lilongwe**; **Lilongwe**	English; Chichewa
**Malaysia**	Kuala Lumpur	**Malaysia**	**Kuala Lumpur**	Malay
**Maldives**	Malé	**Dhivehi Raajje** ދިވެހިރާއްޖެ	**Malé** މާލެ	Dhivehi (Thaana script)
**Mali**	Bamako	**Mali** ߡߊ߬ߟߌ; **Maali** 𞤃𞤢𞥄𞤤𞤭	**Bamakɔ** ߓߡߊ߬ߞߐ߬ **Bamako** 𞤄𞤢𞤥𞤢𞤳𞤮	Bambara; Fula
**Malta**	Valletta	**Malta**; **Malta**	**Valletta** or **Il-Belt Valletta**; **Valletta**	Maltese; English
**Marshall Islands**	Majuro	**Aorōkin Ṃajeḷ**; **Marshall Islands**	**Mājro**; **Majuro**	Marshallese; English
Martinique	Fort-de-France	**Martinique**	**Fort-de-France**	French
**Mauritania**	Nouakchott	**Muritan / Agawec** **ⵎⵓⵔⵉⵜⴰⵏ / ⴰⴳⴰⵡⵛ**; **Mūrītānyā** موريتانيا	**Nwakcuṭ / anu ukcuḍ** **ⵏⵡⴰⴽⵛⵓⵟ / ⴰⵏⵓ ⵓⴽⵛⵓⴹ** **nwakšūṭ** نواكشوط / أنو ؤكشوض	Berber language (Tifinagh script); Arabic (Arabic script)
**Mauritius**	Port Louis	**Mauritius**; **Maurice**; **Moris**	**Port Louis**; **Port-Louis**; **Porlwi**	English; French; Mauritian Creole
Mayotte	Mamoudzou	**Mayotte**; **Maore**	**Mamoudzou**; **Momoju**	French; Shimaore
**Mexico**	Mexico City	**México**; **Mēxihco**	**Ciudad de México**; **Āltepētl Mēxihco**	Spanish; Nahuatl
**Federated States of Micronesia**	Palikir	**Federated States of Micronesia**	**Palikir**	English
**Moldova**	Chișinău	**Moldova**	**Chișinău**	Romanian
**Monaco**	Monaco	**Monaco**; **Múnegu**	**Monaco**; **Múnegu**	French; Monégasque
**Mongolia**	Ulaanbaatar	**Mongol Uls**; Монгол Улс ᠮᠤᠩᠭᠤᠯ ᠤᠯᠤᠰ	**Ulaanbaatar**; Улаанбаатар ᠤᠯᠠᠭᠠᠨᠪᠠᠭᠠᠲᠤᠷ	Mongolian (Cyrillic script) (Mongol script)
**Montenegro**	Podgorica	**Crna Gora**; Црна Гора	**Podgorica**; Подгорица	Montenegrin
Montserrat	Brades Estate	**Montserrat**	**Brades Estate**	English
**Morocco**	Rabat	**Amerruk / Elmeɣrib** ⴰⵎⵔⵔⵓⴽ / ⵍⵎⵖⵔⵉⴱ; **Al-maɣréb** المغرب	**Errbaṭ** ⵔⵔⴱⴰⵟ; **Ar-ribaaṭ** الرباط	Berber language (Tifinagh script); Arabic (Arabic script)
**Mozambique**	Maputo	**Moçambique**; **Muzambhiki**	**Maputo**; **Maputo**	Portuguese; Tsonga
**Myanmar** (or Burma)	Naypyidaw	**Myanma** မြန်မာ	**Nay Pyi Taw** နေပြည်တော်	Burmese (Burmese alphabet)

== N ==
Country (exonym)	Capital (exonym)	Country (endonym)	Capital (endonym)	Official or native language(s) (alphabet/script)
**Namibia**	Windhoek	**Namibia**; **Namibia**; **Namibië**; **Namibia**; **Namibia**	**Windhoek**; **Windhuk**; **Windhoek** **/Ae-//Gams**; **Otjomuise**	English; German; Afrikaans; Damara/Nama; Herero
**Nauru**	Yaren (de facto)	**Nauru**; **Naoero**	**Yaren**; **Yaren**	English; Nauruan
**Nepal**	Kathmandu	**Nepāl** नेपाल	**Kāṭhamāṇḍaũ** काठमाडौँ	Nepali (Devanagari script)
**Netherlands**	Amsterdam	**Nederland**; **Nederlân**	**Amsterdam**; **Amsterdam**	Dutch; West Frisian
New Caledonia	Nouméa	**Nouvelle-Calédonie**	**Nouméa**	French
**New Zealand**	Wellington	**New Zealand**; **Aotearoa**	**Wellington**; **Poneke/Te Whanganui-a-Tara**	English; Māori
**Nicaragua**	Managua	**Nicaragua**	**Managua**	Spanish
**Niger**	Niamey	**Niger**; **Nijar**	**Niamey**; **Yamai**	French; Hausa
**Nigeria**	Abuja	**Nigeria**; **Nijeriya**; **Naìjíríyà**; **Nàìjíríà**	**Abuja**; **Abuja**; **Abuja**; **Àbújá**	English; Hausa; Igbo; Yoruba
**Niue**	Alofi	**Niuē**; **Niue**	**Alofi**; **Alofi**	Niuean; English
Norfolk Island	Kingston	**Norfolk Island**; **Norf'k Ailen**	**Kingston**; **Kingston**	English; Norfuk
**North Macedonia**	Skopje	**Severna Makedonija**; **Северна Македонија**; **Maqedonia e Veriut**	**Skopje**; **Скопје**; **Shkup**	Macedonian (Cyrillic script); Albanian
Northern Mariana Islands	Saipan	**Northern Mariana Islands**; **Notte Mariånas**	**Saipan**; **Saipan**	English; Chamorro
**Norway**	Oslo	**Norge**; **Noreg**; **Norga**; **Vuodna**; **Nöörje**	**Oslo**; **Oslo**; **Oslo**; **Oslo**; **Oslo**	Norwegian Bokmål; Norwegian Nynorsk; Northern Sámi; Lule Sámi; Southern Sámi

== O ==
Country (exonym)	Capital (exonym)	Country (endonym)	Capital (endonym)	Official or native language(s) (alphabet/script)
**Oman**	Muscat	**‘Umān** عُمان	**Masqaṭ** مسقط	Arabic (Arabic script)

== P ==
Country (exonym)	Capital (exonym)	Country (endonym)	Capital (endonym)	Official or native language(s) (alphabet/script)
**Pakistan**	Islamabad	**Pakistan**; **Pākistān** پاکستان	**Islamabad**; **Islāmabād** اسلام‌اباد	English; Urdu (Arabic script [Nastaʿlīq hand])
**Palau**	Ngerulmud	**Belau**; **Palau**	**Ngerulmud**; **Ngerulmud**	Palauan; English
**Palestine**	East Jerusalem (declared); Ramallah (administrative capital) (Note: The State of Palestine claims the territories occupied by Israel since the Six-Day War in 1967, with East Jerusalem as its capital. The proclaimed state is currently occupied by Israel and has no effective control over the territories it claims. Administration is based in Ramallah and Gaza, rather than Jerusalem. Most members of the United Nations regard East Jerusalem as occupied territory, and the Organisation of Islamic Cooperation, the Arab League and the Non-Aligned Movement recognise it as the capital of a future Palestinian state. See the following: Organisation of the Islamic Conference (13–16 March 1989). "Resolutions on Political, Legal and Information Affairs". The Eighteenth Islamic Conference of Foreign Ministers (Session of Islamic Fraternity and Solidarity). Archived from the original on 24 September 2015.; Agence France-Presse (6 September 2011). "Non-Aligned movement confirms support for Palestinian statehood bid". Al Arabiya.; Council of the European Union, 17218/09 (Presse 371). "Press release, 2985th Council meeting on Foreign Affairs" (PDF). Press Office. Archived from the original (PDF) on 2009-12-22. See Positions on Jerusalem.)	**Filasṭīn** فلسطين	**Al-Quds Al-Sharqit** القدس الشرقية; **Rāmallāh** رام الله	Arabic (Arabic script)
**Panama**	Panama City	**Panamá**	**Ciudad de Panamá**	Spanish
**Papua New Guinea**	Port Moresby	**Papua New Guinea**; **Papua Niugini**; **Papua Niu Gini**	**Port Moresby**; **Pot Mosbi**; **Pot Mosbi**	English; Tok Pisin; Hiri Motu
**Paraguay**	Asunción	**Paraguay**; **Paraguái**	**Asunción**; **Paraguay**	Spanish; Guaraní
**Peru**	Lima	**Perú**; **Piruw**	**Lima**; **Lima**	Spanish; Quechua/Aymara
**Philippines**	Manila	**Pilipinas**; **Philippines**	**Maynila**; **Manila**	Filipino; English
Pitcairn Islands	Adamstown	**Pitcairn Islands**; **Pitkern Ailen**	**Adamstown**; **Adamstown**	English Pitcairnese
**Poland**	Warsaw	**Polska**	**Warszawa**	Polish
**Portugal**	Lisbon	**Portugal**	**Lisboa**	Portuguese
Puerto Rico	San Juan	**Puerto Rico**	**San Juan**	English, Spanish

== Q ==
Country (exonym)	Capital (exonym)	Country (endonym)	Capital (endonym)	Official or native language(s) (alphabet/script)
**Qatar**	Doha	**Qaṭar** قطر	**Ad-Dawḥah** الدوحة	Arabic (Arabic script)

== R ==
Country (exonym)	Capital (exonym)	Country (endonym)	Capital (endonym)	Official or native language(s) (alphabet/script)
Réunion	Saint-Denis	**La Réunion**	**Saint-Denis**	French
**Romania**	Bucharest	**România**	**București**	Romanian
**Russia**	Moscow	**Rossiya** or **Rossiâ**; Россия	**Moskva**; Москва	Russian (Cyrillic script)
**Rwanda**	Kigali	**Rwanda**	**Kigali**	French, Kinyarwanda, Swahili, English

== S ==
Country (exonym)	Capital (exonym)	Country (endonym)	Capital (endonym)	Official or native language(s) (alphabet/script)
Saba	The Bottom	**Saba**	The Bottom	Dutch
**Sahrawi Arab Democratic Republic**	Laayoune	**Al-Jumhūrīyah al-‘Arabīyah aṣ-Ṣaḥrāwīyah ad-Dīmuqrāṭīyah** الجمهورية العربية الصحراوية الديمقراطية **República Árabe Saharaui Democrática**	**Al-ʿAyyūn** لعيون **El Aaiún**	Arabic (Arabic script); Spanish
Saint Barthélemy	Gustavia	**Saint-Barthélemy**	**Gustavia**	French
Saint Helena, Ascension and Tristan da Cunha	Jamestown	**Saint Helena, Ascension and Tristan da Cunha**	**Jamestown**	English
**Saint Kitts and Nevis**	Basseterre	**Saint Kitts and Nevis**	**Basseterre**	English
Saint Martin	Marigot	**Saint-Martin**	**Marigot**	French
**Saint Lucia**	Castries	**Saint Lucia**	**Castries**	English
Saint Pierre and Miquelon	Saint-Pierre	**Saint-Pierre et Miquelon**	**Saint-Pierre**	French
**Saint Vincent and the Grenadines**	Kingstown	**Saint Vincent and the Grenadines**	**Kingstown**	English
**Samoa**	Apia	**Samoa**; **Sāmoa**	**Apia**; **Apia**	English; Samoan
**San Marino**	San Marino	**San Marino**	**San Marino**	Italian
**São Tomé and Príncipe**	São Tomé	**São Tomé e Príncipe**	**São Tomé**	Portuguese
**Saudi Arabia**	Riyadh	**Al-Mamlaka Al-‘Arabiyyah as Sa‘ūdiyyah** المملكة العربية السعودية	**Ar-Riyāḍ** الرياض	Arabic (Arabic script)
**Senegal**	Dakar	**Sénégal**; **Senegaal**	**Dakar**; **Ndakaaru**	French; Wolof
**Serbia**	Belgrade	**Srbija**; **Србија**	**Beograd**; **Београд**	Serbian (Cyrillic script)
**Seychelles**	Victoria	**Sesel**; **Seychelles**; **Seychelles**	**Victoria** or **Port Victoria**	Seychellois Creole; French; English
**Sierra Leone**	Freetown	**Sierra Leone**	**Freetown**	English
**Singapore**	Singapore	**Singapura**; **Singapore**; **Xīnjiāpō** 新加坡; **Singapur** சிங்கப்பூர்	**Singapura**; **Singapore**; **Xīnjiāpō** 新加坡; **Singapur** சிங்கப்பூர்	Malay; English; Mandarin Chinese (Simplified Chinese characters); Tamil (Tamil script)
Sint Maarten	Philipsburg	**Sint Maarten**; **Sint Maarten**	**Philipsburg**; **Philipsburg**	Dutch; English
**Slovakia**	Bratislava	**Slovensko**	**Bratislava**	Slovak
**Slovenia**	Ljubljana	**Slovenija**	**Ljubljana**	Slovene
**Solomon Islands**	Honiara	**Solomon Islands**; **Solomon Aelan**	**Honiara**; **Honiala**	English; Neo-Solomonic
**Somalia**	Mogadishu	**Soomaaliya** **aş-Şūmāl** الصومال	**Muqdisho**; **Maqadīshū** مقديشو	Somali; Arabic (Arabic script)
**South Africa**	Pretoria (administrative capital), Cape Town (legislative capital), Bloemfontein, (judicial capital)	**South Africa**; **Suid-Afrika** **iNingizimu Afrika** **uMzantsi Afrika**; **Afrika-Borwa**; **Afrika Borwa**; **Aforika Borwa**; **Afurika Tshipembe**; **Afrika Dzonga** **iNingizimu Afrika** **iSewula Afrika**	**Pretoria**, **Cape Town**; **Pretoria, Kaapstad** **iPitoli, iKapa** **iPitoli, iKapa**; **Pretoria**; **Pretoria**; **Pretoria**; **Pretoria**; **Pitori** **iPitoli** **iPitori**	English; Afrikaans isiZulu isiXhosa; Pedi; Sotho; Tswana; Venda; Tsonga; Swazi; Ndebele
**South Sudan**	Juba	**South Sudan**; **Paguot Thudän**; Sudan Kusini	**Juba**; **Juba**; **Juba**	English; Dinka; Swahili
**Spain**	Madrid	**España**; **Espanya**; **Espainia**; **Espanha**	**Madrid**; **Madrid**; **Madril**; **Madrid**	Spanish, Galician; Catalan; Basque; Aranese, Galician (R)
**Sri Lanka**	Sri Jayawardenapura Kotte	**Sri Lankā** ශ්‍රී ලංකාව இலங்கை	**Sri Jayawardenapura Kotte** ශ්‍රී ජයවර්ධනපුර කෝට්ටේ ஶ்ரீ ஜெயவர்த்தனபுரம் கோட்டை	Sinhala; Tamil
Sint Eustatius	Oranjestad	**Sint Eustatius**; **Statia**	**Oranjestad**; **Oranjestad**	Dutch; English
**Sudan**	Khartoum	**As-Sudan** السودان	**Al-Khartûm** الخرطوم	Arabic (Arabic script)
**Suriname**	Paramaribo	**Suriname**	**Paramaribo**	Dutch
Svalbard	Longyearbyen	**Svalbard**	**Longyearbyen**	Norwegian
**Sweden**	Stockholm	**Sverige**	**Stockholm**	Swedish
**Switzerland**	Bern (de facto)	**Schweiz**; **Suisse**; **Svizzera**; **Svizra**	**Bern**; **Berne**; **Berna**; **Berna**	German; French; Italian; Romansh
**Syria**	Damascus	**Suriyah** سورية	**Dimashq / Ash-Sham** الشام / دمشق	Arabic (Arabic script)

== T ==
Country (exonym)	Capital (exonym)	Country (endonym)	Capital (endonym)	Official or native language(s) (alphabet/script)
**Taiwan (Republic of China)**	Taipei	**Zhōnghuá Mínguó** or **Táiwān** 中華民國 or 臺灣/台灣	**Táiběi** 臺北/台北	Chinese (Traditional Chinese characters)
**Tajikistan**	Dushanbe	**Tojikiston**; Тоҷикистон	**Dushanbe**; Душанбе	Tajiki-Persian (Cyrillic)
**Tanzania**	Dodoma	**Tanzania**	**Dodoma**	English, Swahili
**Thailand**	Bangkok	**Thai, Prathet Thai, Ratcha-anachak Thai** ไทย, ประเทศไทย, ราชอาณาจักรไทย	**Krung Thep, Krung Thep Maha Nakhon** กรุงเทพฯ, กรุงเทพมหานคร	Thai (Thai script)
**Togo**	Lomé	**Togo**; **Togo**; **Togo**	**Lomé**; **Lome**; **Loma**	French; Ewe; Kabiye
Tokelau		**Tokelau**		English, Tokelauan
**Tonga**	Nukuʻalofa	**Tonga**	**Nukuʻalofa**	Tongan, English
**Trinidad and Tobago**	Port of Spain	**Trinidad and Tobago**	**Port of Spain**	English
**Tunisia**	Tunis	**Tunes** ⵜⵓⵏⵙ; **Tūns** تونس	**Tunes** ⵜⵓⵏⵙ; **Tūns** تونس	Berber language (Tifinagh script); Arabic (Arabic script)
**Turkey**	Ankara	**Türkiye**	**Ankara**	Turkish
**Turkmenistan**	Ashgabat	**Türkmenistan**	**Aşgabat**	Turkmen
Turks and Caicos Islands	Cockburn Town	**Turks and Caicos Islands**	**Cockburn Town**	English
**Tuvalu**	Fongafale (in Funafuti)	**Tuvalu**	**Fongafale**	English, Tuvaluan

== U ==
Country (exonym)	Capital (exonym)	Country (endonym)	Capital (endonym)	Official or native language(s) (alphabet/script)
**Uganda**	Kampala	**Uganda**	**Kampala**	English, Swahili
**Ukraine**	Kyiv	**Ukrajina**; Україна	**Kyjiv**; Київ	Ukrainian (Cyrillic script)
**United Arab Emirates**	Abu Dhabi	**Al-’Imārat Al-‘Arabiyyah Al-Muttaḥidah** الإمارات العربيّة المتّحدة	**‘Abū ẓabī** أبوظبي	Arabic (Arabic script)
**United Kingdom**	London	**United Kingdom** or **Britain**; **Y Deyrnas Unedig**; **Unitit Kinrick**; **Rìoghachd Aonaichte**; **Ríocht Aontaithe**; **An Rywvaneth Unys**	**London**; **Llundain**; **Lunnon**; **Lunnainn**; **Londain**; **Loundres**	English; Welsh; Scots; Scots Gaelic; Irish; Cornish
**United States**	Washington, D.C.	**United States** or **America**; **Estados Unidos**; **États-Unis** (multiple names) **‘Amelika Hui Pū ‘ia**	**Washington, D.C.**, **Washington**, or **D.C.** **Washington D.C.** **Washington, D.C.** (multiple names); **Wakinekona**/**Wasinetona**	English; Spanish; Cajun French; Indigenous; Hawaiian
United States Virgin Islands	Charlotte Amalie	**United States Virgin Islands**	**Charlotte Amalie**	English
**Uruguay**	Montevideo	**Uruguay**	**Montevideo**	Spanish
**Uzbekistan**	Tashkent	**O‘zbekiston**; Ўзбекистон	**Toshkent**; Тошкент	Uzbek (Cyrillic script)

== V ==
Country (exonym)	Capital (exonym)	Country (endonym)	Capital (endonym)	Official or native language(s) (alphabet/script)
**Vanuatu**	Port Vila	**Vanuatu**	**Port-Vila**	French
**Vatican City**	Vatican City	**Civitas Vaticana**; **Città del Vaticano**	**Civitas Vaticana**; **Città del Vaticano**	Latin; Italian
**Venezuela**	Caracas	**Venezuela**	**Caracas**	Spanish
**Vietnam**	Hanoi	**Việt Nam**	**Hà Nội**	Vietnamese

== W ==
Country (exonym)	Capital (exonym)	Country (endonym)	Capital (endonym)	Official or native language(s) (alphabet/script)
Wallis and Futuna	Mata Utu	**Wallis-et-Futuna** **ʻUvea mo Futuna**	**Mata Utu**; **Matāʻutu**	French; Wallisian; Futunan

== Y ==
Country (exonym)	Capital (exonym)	Country (endonym)	Capital (endonym)	Official or native language(s) (alphabet/script)
**Yemen**	Sanaa	**Al-Yaman** اليمن	**Ṣan‘ā’** ﺻﻨﻌﺎﺀ	Arabic (Arabic script)

== Z ==
Country (exonym)	Capital (exonym)	Country (endonym)	Capital (endonym)	Official or native language(s) (alphabet/script)
**Zambia**	Lusaka	**Zambia**	**Lusaka**	English, Bemba, Chewa
**Zimbabwe**	Harare	**Zimbabwe**	**Harare**	English, Shona

== Notes ==
By ISO 639-3 code
Enter an ISO code to find the corresponding language article.
