= List of museums in Norfolk Island =

Norfolk Island has two museum organisations:

- The Norfolk Island Museum which is spread across five locations, including:
  - No. 10 Quality Row - a Georgian period house
  - Pier Store - museum of the Bounty Mutineers and Pitcairn Island
  - Sirius Museum - maritime museum dedicated to HMS Sirius
  - Commissariat Store - archaeological displays
  - Norfolk Island Research Centre - archive
- Bounty Folk Museum
