= Languages of Norfolk Island =

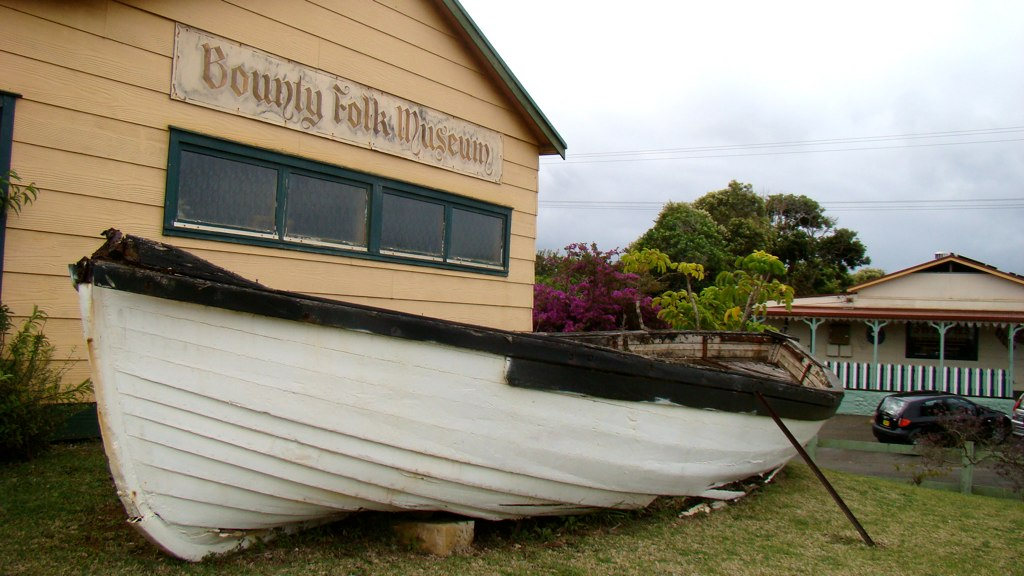
- The Bounty Folk Museum with signage in English
- Official: English, Norfuk
- Immigrant: Fijian, Mandarin, Tagalog
- Keyboard layout: QWERTY

There are two official languages of Norfolk Island, English and Norfuk. English, due to the influence of the United Kingdom and Australia, the two colonial powers who administered Norfolk Island, is the dominant language of the pair.

== Official languages ==
=== English ===
The 2021 Norfolk Island census reported that 1,146 households (52.4%) spoke only English at home.

=== Norfuk ===
Norfuk, a creole language based on English and Tahitian and brought to the island by the descendants of the Bounty mutineers from Pitcairn Island was spoken by 580 people according to the 1989 census. It is closely related to Pitkern spoken on Pitcairn Island.

In the 1970s, use of the Norfuk language was declining, prompting discussions about how to implement Norfolk into the school system. The Society of the Descendants of Pitcairn Islanders, founded in 1977, was a driving force behind the campaign to include Norfuk language as a teachable subject in schools.

In 2004, the Norfolk Island Language (Norf’k or Norfuk) was proclaimed an official language of Norfolk Island via the Norfolk Island Language (Norf’k) Act 2004. A 2005 article by the Telegraph stated that around half of Norfolk Island's 2,000 current inhabitants speak Norfuk and that the language was being taught to the island's 400 school children.

The 2021 Norfolk Island census reported that 667 households (30.5%) spoke Norf'k-Pitcairn at home.

== Other spoken languages ==
The 2021 Norfolk Island census reported that 27 households (1.2%) spoke Fijian, 18 households (0.8%) spoke Tagalog, 11 (0.5%) spoke Filipino, and 10 (0.5%) spoke Mandarin.

== See also ==
- Australian English
- Norfuk language
