= Merval Hoare =

New Zealand-born historian

- Born: 17 June 1914; Wellington, New Zealand
- Died: 8 December 2001 (aged 87); Lismore, New South Wales, Australia
- Occupations: poet, writer and historian
- Notable work: Norfolk Island: An Outline of Its History 1774-1987

Merval Hoare (17 June 1914 – 8 December 2001) was a New Zealand-born poet, writer, and historian. She was a resident of Norfolk Island and wrote about its history.

== Biography ==
Merval Hoare was born Merval Connelly in Wellington, New Zealand on 17 June 1914, and after marrying Percy Raymond Hoare (Ray) in 1949, moved to Norfolk Island with him. Her early schooling developed interests in music, prose, poetry and politics. Merval was a correspondent for the Pacific Islands Monthly (PIM) magazine for many years and researched Norfolk Island's history in Australian and New Zealand institutions and libraries. In 1963 while researching the Bishop Selwyn Papers in the Auckland Institute and Museum, she found the 'Freemantle Document' which clarifies the terms on which the Pitcairn Islanders were settled on Norfolk Island. She was awarded the MBE in 1983 for services to Norfolk Island historical literature. She wrote her book, Norfolk Island An Outline of Its History, 1774 - 1968, which was published by the University of Queensland Press in 1969. The book has 5 editions, most recent being published in 1998. Her book provided a lot of information about Norfolk Island in the 20th century. The Norfolk Island Museum described the book as authoritative account and definite work, a result of her deep interest in the Island and its history.

== Death ==
Merval Hoare died Lismore, New South Wales, Australia. She is survived by her daughter Ann, son-in-law Ken Burke, 3 granddaughters and 4 great granddaughters.

Her Publications include:

Twelve Poems published in 1944

Twenty-eight Poems published in 1951

Norfolk Island A Brief Background, illustrated by Gordon McAuslan published 1951

A Rambler's Guide to Norfolk Island published first published in 1965

Norfolk Island An Outline of Its History, 1774–1968, first published in 1969 which has 5 editions, most recent being published and updated in 1998

The Discovery of Norfolk Island published in 1974

Norfolk Island A history through illustration 1774–1974 published in 1979

Elizabeth Robertson's Diary Edited by Merval Hoare published in 1988

The Winds of Change: Norfolk Island 1950–1982 published in 1983

Thomas Samuel Stewart's Journal, Waiting for the Pitcairn Islanders, edited by Leanne Chambers and Merval Hoare published in 1992

Norfolk Island in the 1930s Administrator Pinney's Term published in 1996

Nelson Bear and the Yellow Umbrella illustrated by Tracey Yager published in 2014

- Norfolk Island: An Outline of Its History 1774-1987 (1988)
- Ramblers' Guide to Norfolk Island (1982)
- Norfolk Island: An outline of its history 1774-1977 (1978)
- Nelson Bear and the Yellow Umbrella (1955)
