= Alice Buffett =

Norfolk Islander politician and linguist

Alice Inez Buffett OAM (6 March 1931 – 29 April 2017) was a political figure and linguist from the Australian territory of Norfolk Island.

== Political role ==
In 1981 Alice Buffett stood for and was elected to serve as a member of the Norfolk Island Legislative Assembly.

Buffett was awarded the Medal of the Order of Australian in the 1998 Australia Day Honours for "service to the Norfolk Island community, particularly as a member of the Legislative Assembly advocating initiatives to improve health care facilities and social infrastructure".

== Linguist ==
Alice Buffett is also a noted linguist. She is the author of "Speak Norfuk Today", widely recognised as the most complete resource on the Norfuk language in existence; this work was prepared with the collaboration of the late Dr. Donald Laycock of the Australian National University.

== See also ==
- Pitkern
