= Eve Semple =

Norfolk Islander politician, activist and curator

Eve Semple (born 1976) is a social justice, women's rights activist and curator from Norfolk Island, who is a member of the Norfolk Island Advisory Council and of Women’s Advocacy Group Norfolk Island.

== Biography ==
Semple was born in 1976 and she attended university in Australia. In 2013 she was Chairperson of the Social Welfare Advisory Committee of Norfolk Island and spoke out about the poverty that many islanders faced after the financial crash of 2007. She is also the convenor of Women’s Advocacy Group Norfolk Island (WAGNI), who received a grant from the Australian government in 2018 to improve women's financial literacy on the island.

In 2015 she was appointed to the Norfolk Island Advisory Council. In the aftermath of the transition of Norfolk Island to Australian governance, Semple welcomed the introduction of Medicare and changes to domestic violence laws for women on the island.

Semple is a museum curator and has held the role of Director of the Norfolk Island Museum. In 2005, Semple and colleagues received a grant from the Australian Research Council, in order to promote and facilitate revival of the Norfolk Island language.
