= Norfolk Island Museum =

Australian heritage organisation

- Location: Kingston, Norfolk Island
- Coordinates: 29.055°S 167.961°E
- Key holdings: Objects relating the HMS Sirius, HMS Bounty
- Collections: Archaeology, Social History
- Website: norfolkislandmuseum.com.au

Norfolk Island Museum is a museum organisation on Norfolk Island, an external territory of Australia in the southern Pacific Ocean. The museum comprises five sites and collections that include archaeological, archival and social history objects that reflect subsequent waves of forced migration to the island.

== Sites ==
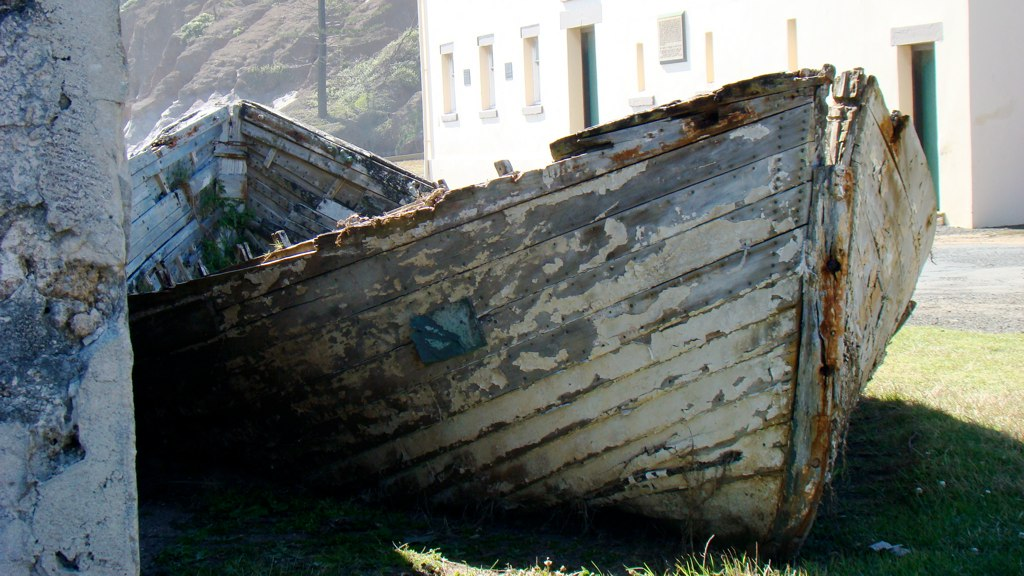
Norfolk Island Lighter Boat, with Pier Store in background

Norfolk Island Museum consists of five sites: No. 10 Quality Row - a Georgian period house; Pier Store - a museum of the Bounty Mutineers and Pitcairn Island; Sirius Museum - a maritime museum dedicated to HMS Sirius; Commissariat Store - housing archaeological displays; Norfolk Island Research Centre - the archive. The museums lie within the Kingston and Arthur's Vale Historic Area, a World Heritage Site also linked to the Australian Convict Sites.

== Collections ==
Collections held by Norfolk Island Museum include material excavated from the HMS Sirius during a research programme led by Graham Henderson in the 1980s. This consists of over 6000 objects. The collection also includes material from archaeological excavations on the island, both prehistoric and historic, including material excavated during the Norfolk Island Prehistory Project. Objects include yolla stones, which are a kind of grater.

The archaeological collections are extensively catalogued. The collection include objects relating to the social history of the islands, for example buildings such as the Paradise Hotel. There are also 14,000 objects relating to the history of the penal colonies. The collections also include objects acquired by the Norfolk Island Historical Society, such as the Bounty Ring.

Archival collections include the diaries of missionary Julia Coleridge Farr, who kept diaries during her stay on the island in the 1890s. The physical copies of these have been digitised. The holdings also include early maps of the island.

=== Overseas collections ===
Objects relating to the history of Norfolk Island are held in overseas collections, including: Powerhouse Museum in Sydney, Museum of Archaeology and Anthropology in Cambridge, Naturalis Biodiversity Centre in Leiden, Muséum national d'Histoire naturelle in Paris, amongst others.

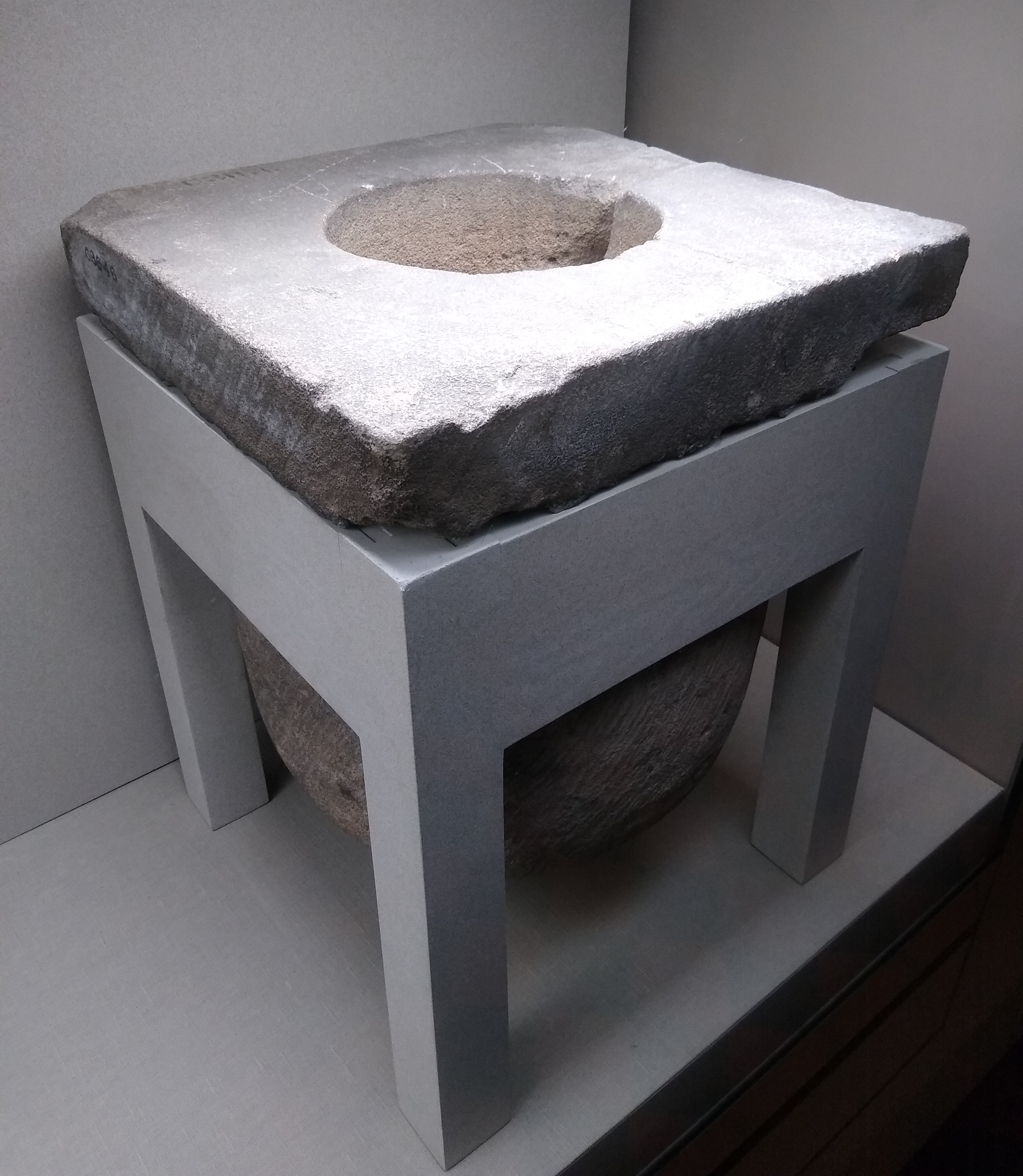
Water drip filter, Powerhouse Museum

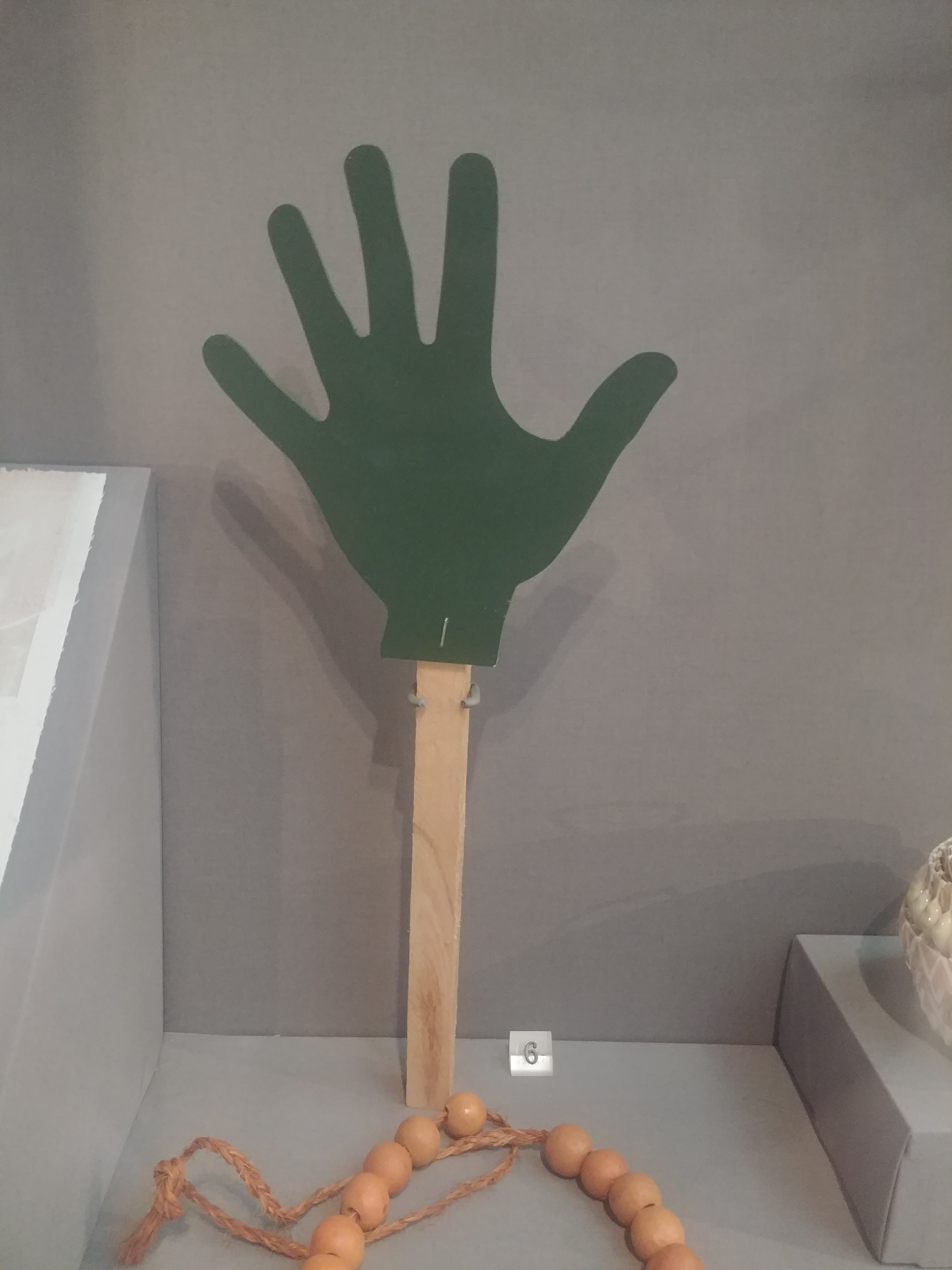
Protest hand, Museum of Archaeology and Anthropology

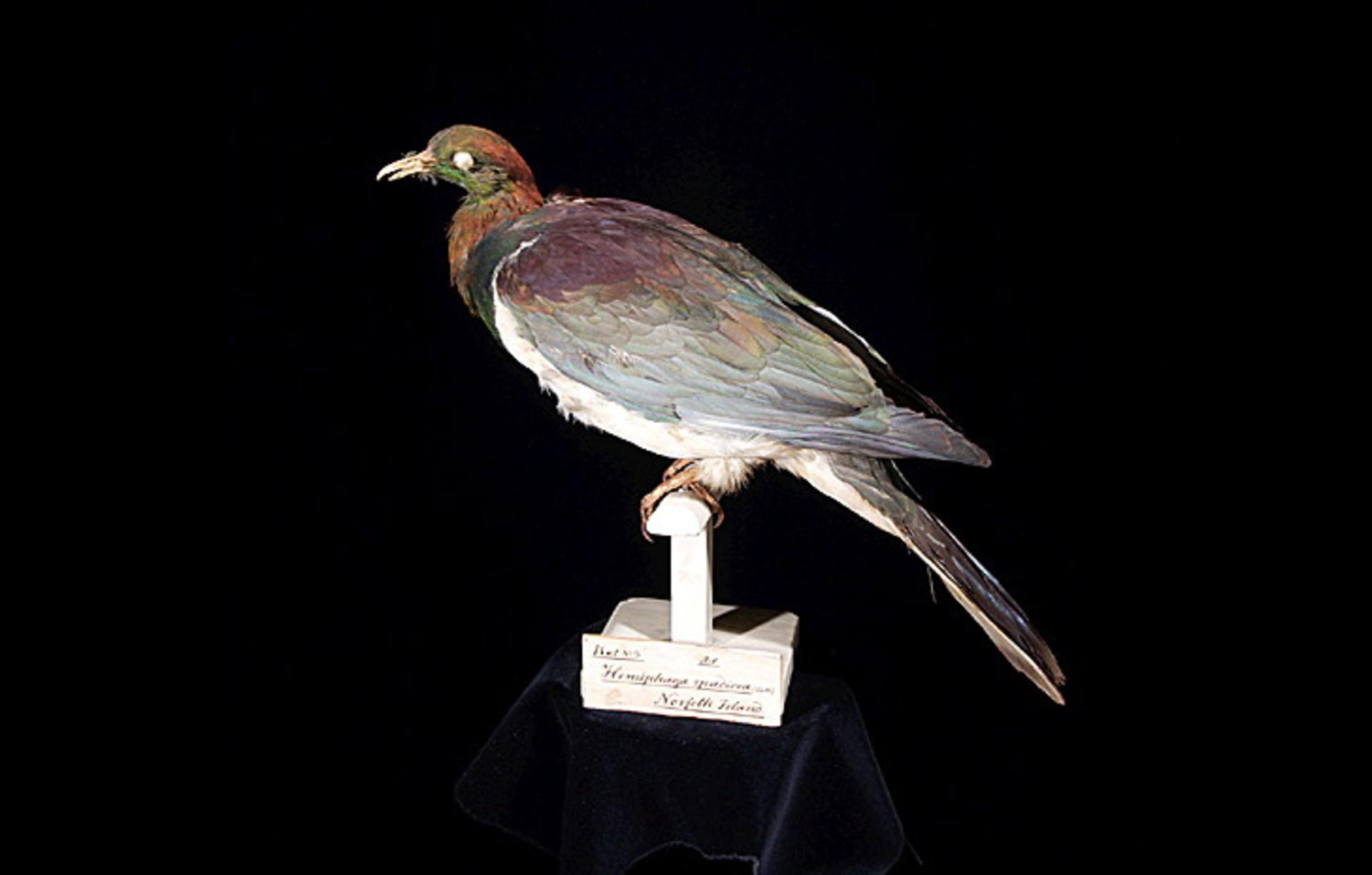
Norfolk pigeon, Naturalis Biodiversity Centre

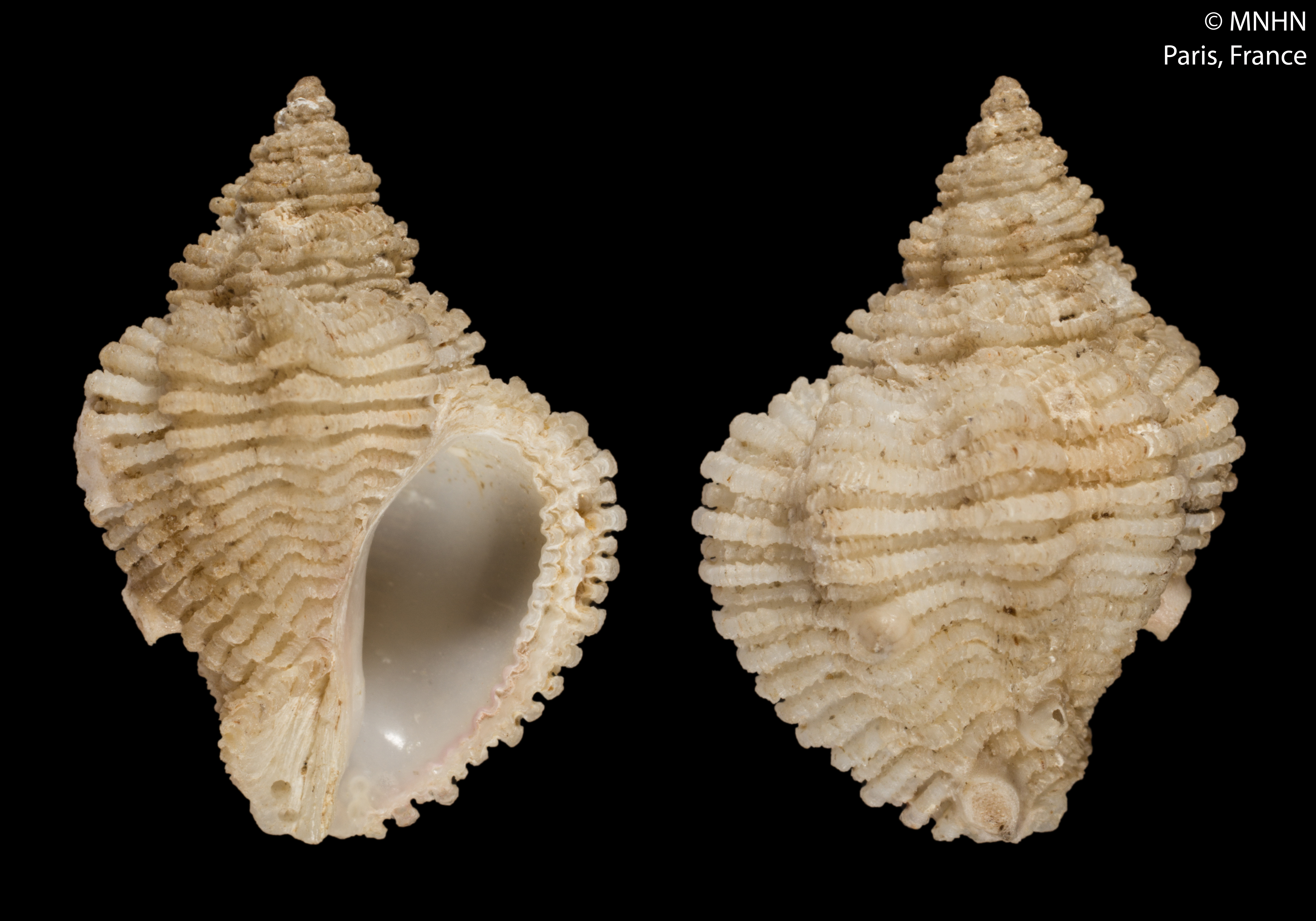
Coralliophila norfolk in Muséum national d'Histoire naturelle

== Directors ==
- Eve Semple
- Lisa Richards (c.2018)
- Nigel Erskine (2000–2003)
- Nina Stanton

== See also ==
- Bounty Museum
- Pitcairn Island Museum
