= Pitcairn Island Museum =

History museum in Pitcairn Island

Coordinates: 25°3′58.66″S 130°6′1.73″W

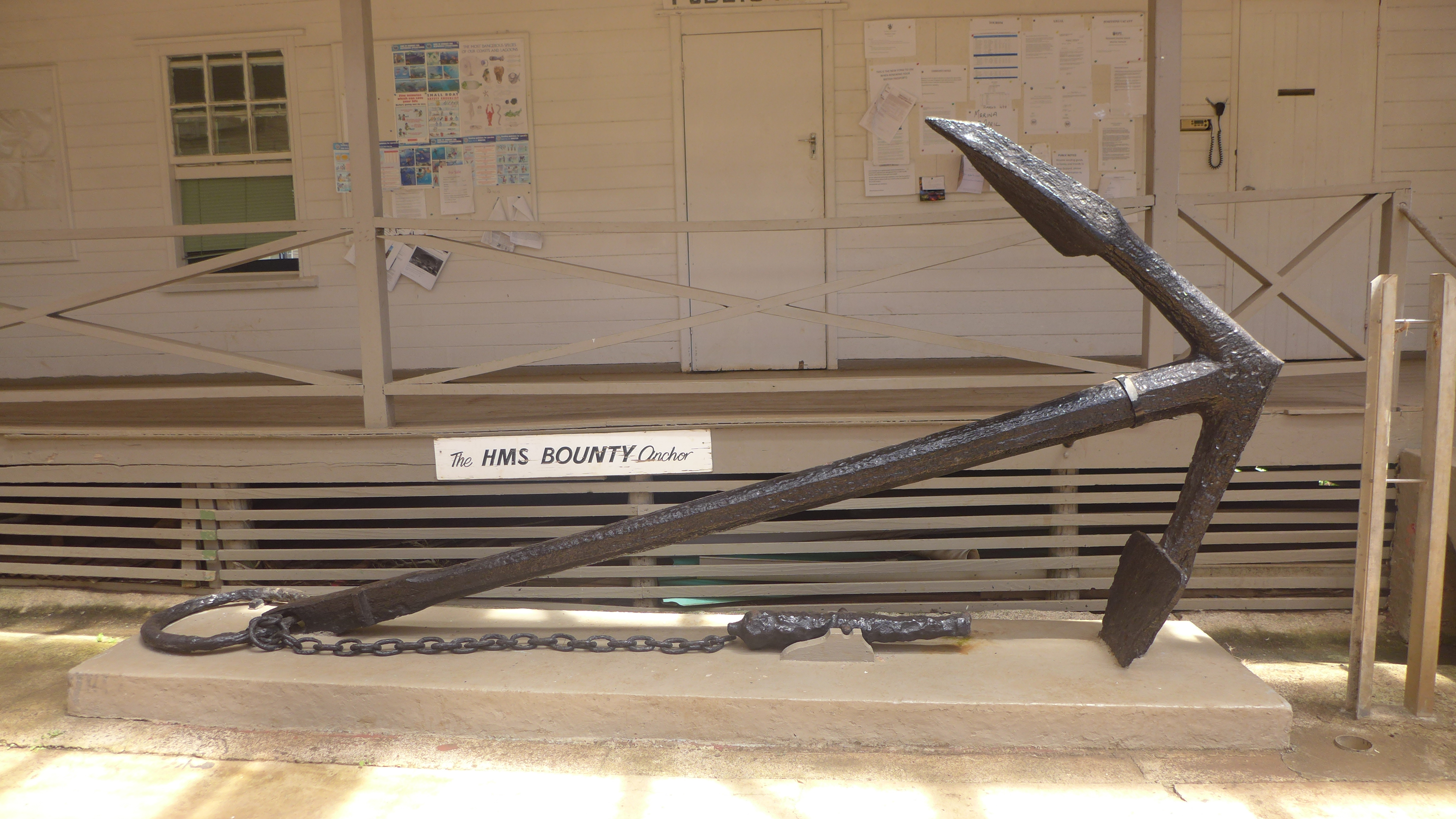
- Established: 2005
- Location: Pitcairn Island
- Type: History and archaeology
- Website: https://www.government.pn/museum.html

Pitcairn Island Museum is a museum in Pitcairn Island, a British Overseas Territory in the southern Pacific Ocean. Established in 2005, the museum's collection includes archaeological material from the earliest Polynesian settlers, as well as artefacts from HMS Bounty.

== Background ==
The museum collection was first located within the school; it transferred to a new building in 2005. The new building was funded by the British government. According to researcher Maria Amoamo, during the year 2008 to 2009 the museum only opened once. As of 2015, the museum charged tourists an entry fee of $5.

== Collections ==
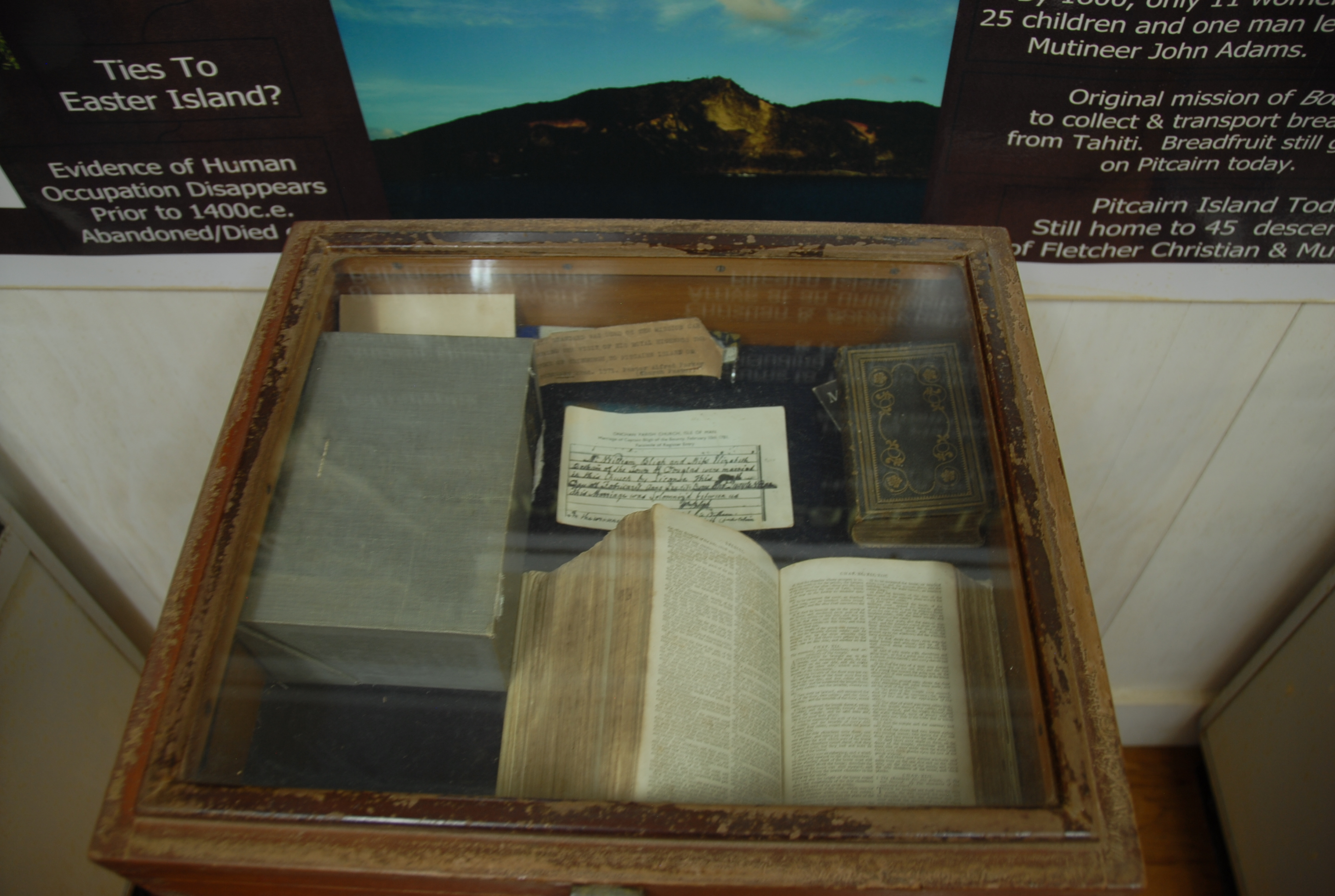
"Bounty" Bible

The museum contains ancient artefacts such as stone tools, which were made by Polynesians who lived on the island prior to the arrival of the mutineers. In 1998 archaeologists from James Cook University excavated the wreck of HMS Bounty. Artefacts from the wreck, such as the cannon were conserved at the Queensland Museum before returning to Pitcairn for display. The collection includes other objects, including a wheelbarrow, a Bible thought to be from the Bounty, and various books and articles about the history of Pitcairn Island. The collection also includes archival items, such as letters written to family members on Pitcairn from those living on Norfolk Island. Archival research on Pitcairn demonstrated that there had been dispute over ownership of artefacts in the museum, as well as whether they should be in a "museum".

=== Objects held in overseas collections ===
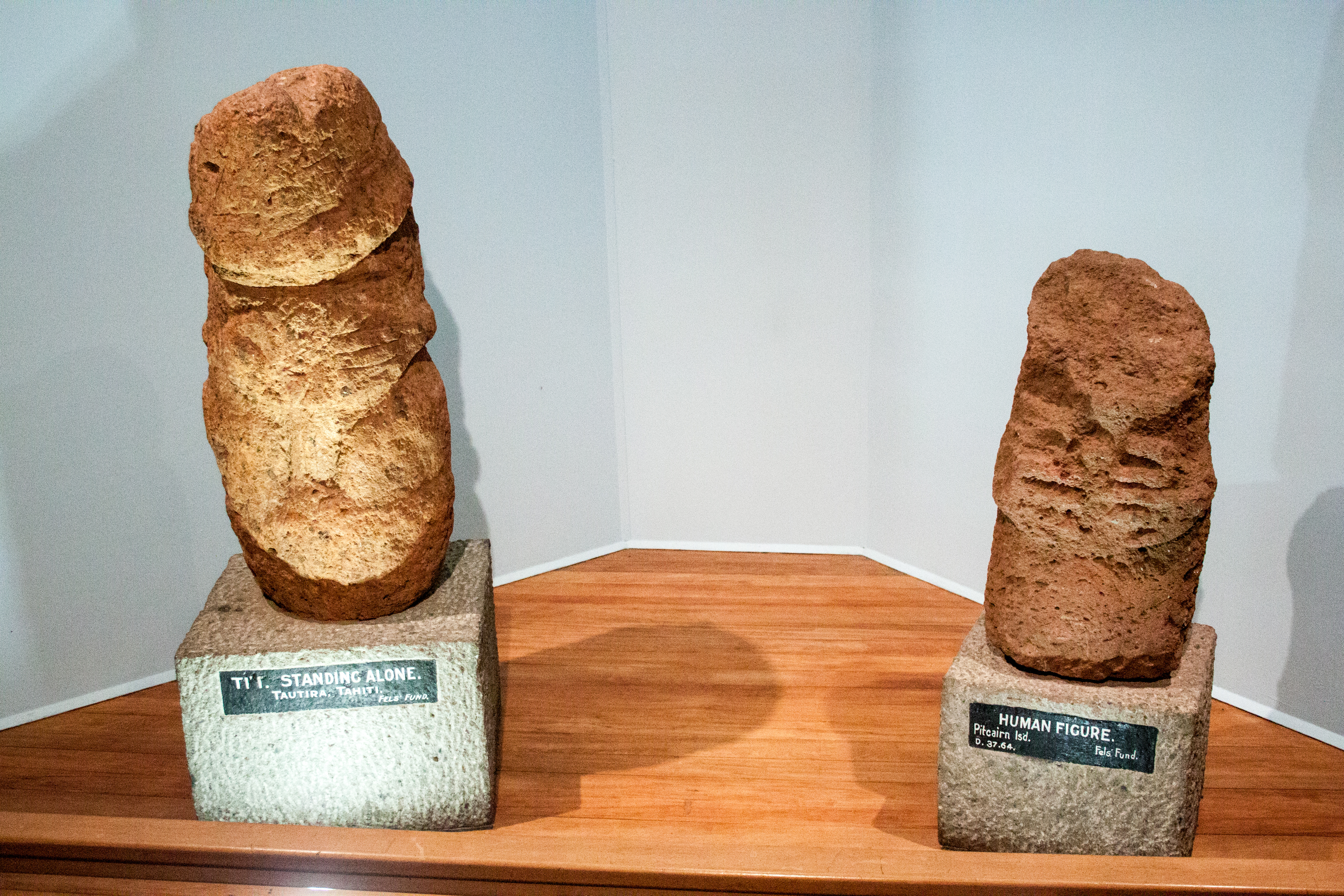
Stone sculptures from Tahiti and Pitcairn Island, Otago Museum, 2016

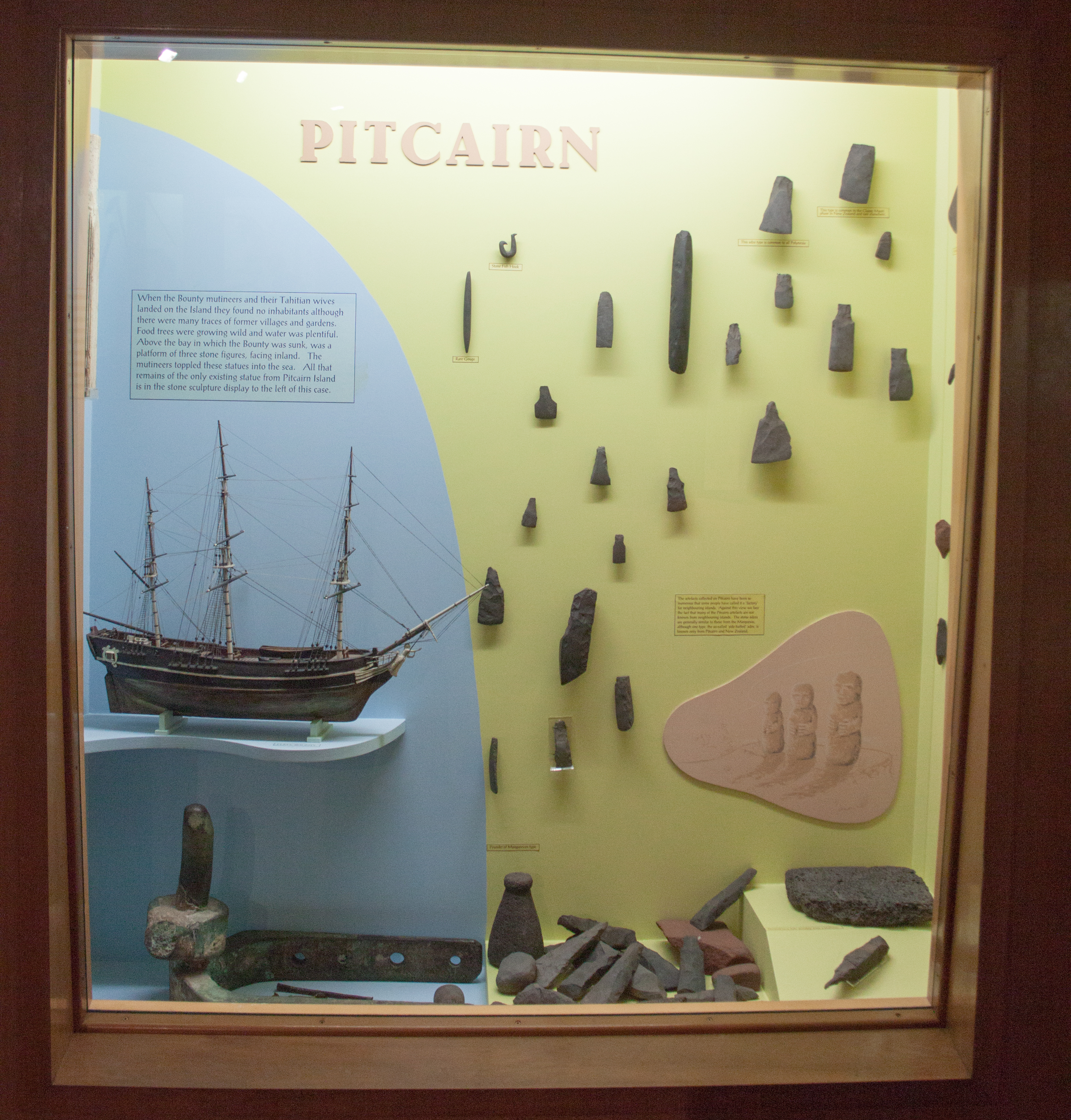
Display of objects from the Pitcairn Island, Otago Museum, 2016

There is a long history of artefacts from Pitcairn Island being traded for goods such as flour, sugar and other essential items. This trade included pre-Mutiny artefacts as well as objects from HMS Bounty. The only surviving example of pre-Mutiny stone sculpture from Pitcairn is a statue held in Otago Museum. The Auckland War Memorial Museum has an extensive collection of stone tools from Pitcairn, including adzes collected by descendants of the mutineers in the 1940s to 1960s.

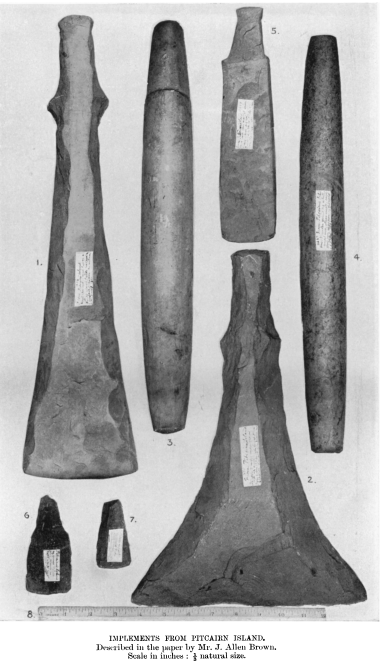
Stone tools from Pitcairn Island

The Pitt Rivers Museum in Oxford also has 93 stone tools from Pitcairn in its collection. The earliest object collected is and adze brought back by William Gunn who was Surgeon General of HMS Curacao. The collection also includes material purchased at auction, that had been published by archaeologist John Allen Brown, whose nephew Lieutenant Gerald Pike had collected objects in November 1897 while he was serving on HMS Comus.

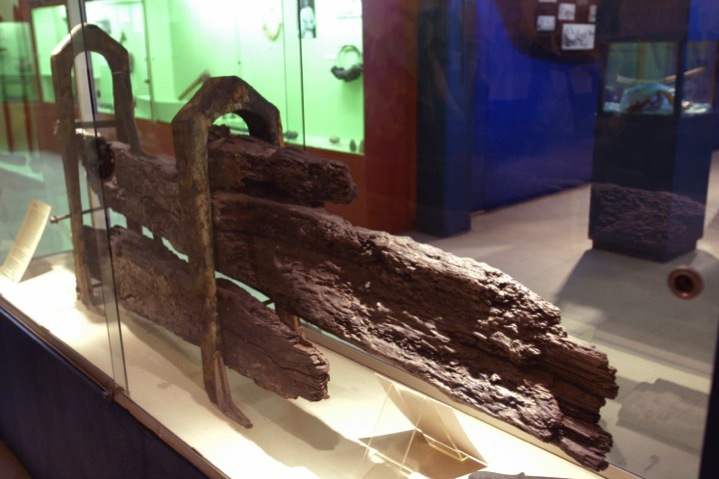
Bounty rudder from the Fiji Museum. Suva, Fiji Islands

The hammer and anvil from HMS Bounty are held in the collection of the Mariners' Museum and Park in Virginia. Examples of tapa cloth are held in the British Museum and at Kew Gardens, in particular those made by original settlers Mauatua and Teraura. The remains of the Bounty rudder are held in the Fiji Museum.

A rare example of a Laughing Gull found on Pitcairn was deposited at Te Papa in New Zealand.

== See also ==
- Bounty Museum
