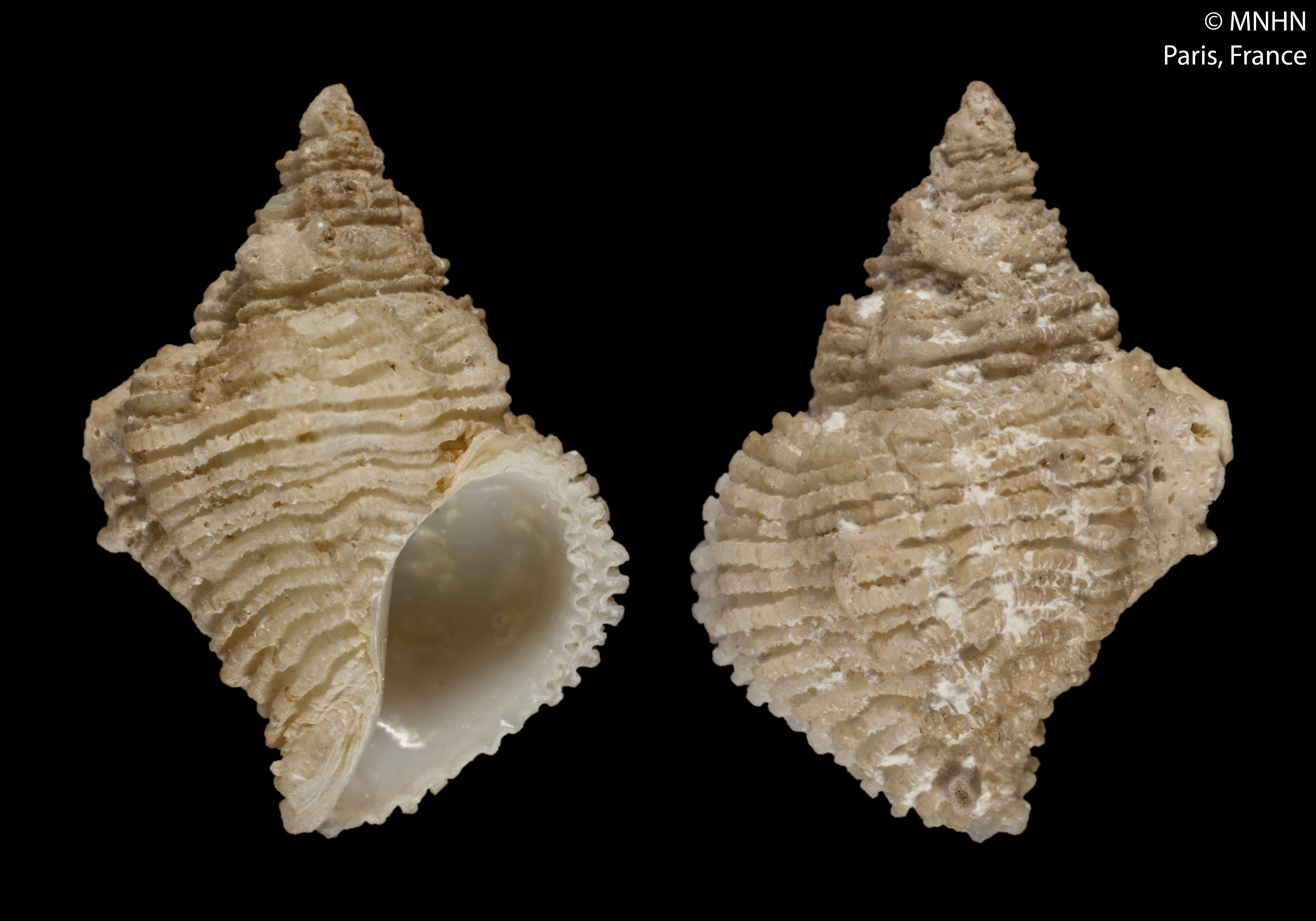
- Shell of Coralliophila norfolk (paratype at MNHN, Paris)

Scientific classification
- Kingdom: Animalia
- Phylum: Mollusca
- Class: Gastropoda
- Subclass: Caenogastropoda
- Order: Neogastropoda
- Family: Muricidae
- Genus: Coralliophila
- Species: C. norfolk

Binomial name
- Coralliophila norfolk Oliverio, 2008

= Coralliophila norfolk =

Species of gastropod

Coralliophila norfolk is a species of sea snail, a marine gastropod mollusc in the family Muricidae, the murex snails or rock snails.

== Distribution ==
This marine species was found on the Norfolk Ridge, New Caledonia.
