= Margaret and Frederick Jowett =

Australian entomologists

Margaret Rosemary Jowett (known as 'Maurge,' née Ferguson, 1930–2023) and Frederick William Jowett (known as 'Freddie' 1922–1986), often referred to professionally as Mr. and Mrs. F. Jowett, were an Australian couple who lived and worked on Norfolk Island and were known for recording the insect species of the Island.

The Jowetts moved to Norfolk Island in 1963 so that Frederick could become the Island's communications engineer and operate an ionospheric station. Frederick also served as a magistrate. Margaret trained and worked as a nurse, particularly for older people. Frederick Jowett died on 1 October 1986. In 2002 Margaret Jowett was awarded the Order of Australia for her community work and ecological work. Margaret died on 27 September 2023.

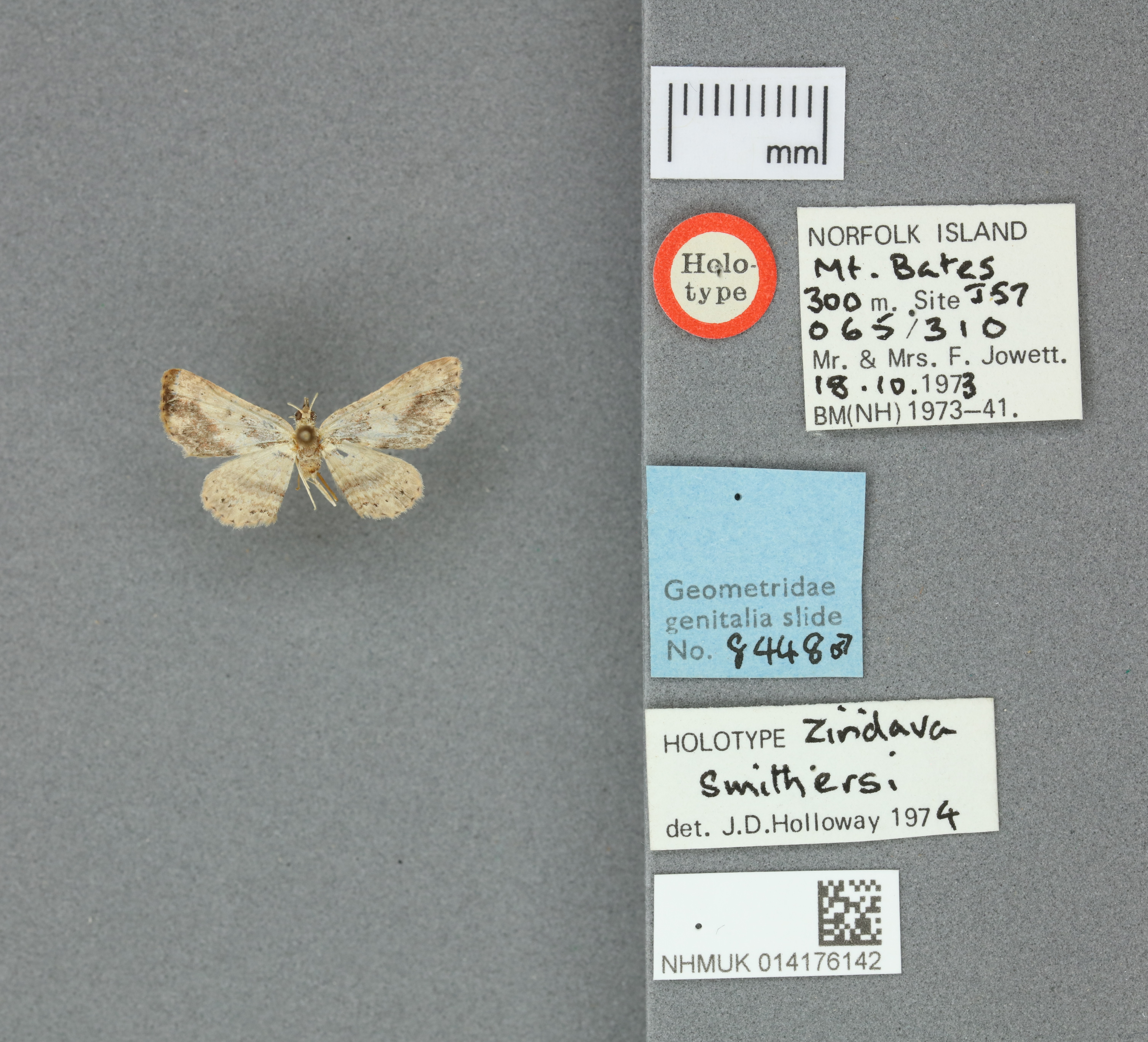
Holotype specimen of Ziridava smithersi, now known as Gymnoscelis smithersi (Holloway, 1977), collected by Frederick and Margaret Jowett on Norfolk Island in 1973 (NHMUK014176142)

== Entomology ==
From 1971 to 1984 the Jowetts supported the work of British research entomologist Jeremy Holloway, including contributing species occurrence records to the book The Lepidoptera of Norfolk Island: Their Biogeography and Ecology (1977). In 1973, the Jowetts collected the Holotype specimen of the Norfolk Island moth Gymnoscelis smithersi (Holloway, 1977).

Some insect specimens collected by the Jowetts are in the collection of the Natural History Museum, London.

Margaret Jowett would sometimes give entomologists who visited Norfolk Island research space at her home. In March 1985 M. Christian and M. Sexton collected a species of the mite family Malaconothridae in Margaret's garden at Red Road, which in 2013 was named in Margaret's honour as the new species Malaconothrus jowettae Colloff & Cameron, 2013. The Type specimens of Malaconothrus jowettae are part of the Australian National Insect Collection, at CSIRO in Canberra.
