= Bounty Museum =

Museum on Norfolk Island

Coordinates: 29.0416°S 167.9650°E

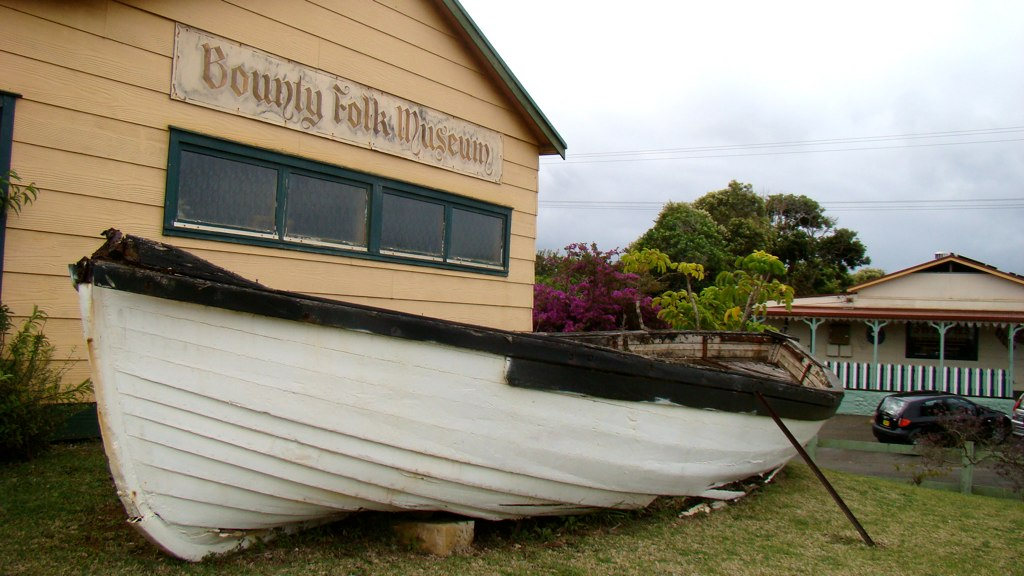
- Former name: Bounty Folk Museum
- Location: Norfolk Island
- Type: Folk museum
- Key holdings: Memorabilia relating to the Bounty mutineers
- Website: Bounty Museum

Bounty Museum, also Bounty Folk Museum, is the original museum on Norfolk Island, an Australian external territory in the South Pacific located 1400 km east of Byron Bay, NSW, Australia.

== Collection ==
Its collection includes archival photographs, HMAV Bounty memorabilia, Norfolk Island artifacts, stamps, paintings, convict items and medical instruments. Interpretation focuses on what life was like for the early settlers from Pitcairn Island.

The exhibition “Captain Bligh, Myth, Man & Mutiny” also forms part of the Museum. This exhibition tells the story of Captain Bligh, challenging the Hollywood depiction of the famous mutiny on HMS Bounty. It features relics from the voyage and a specially built reproduction of the Bounty launch built to scale by the Maritime Museum in the UK using the original plans from the Bounty.

== Radio Station ==
87.6 FM - Watawieh FM is a South Pacific Island radio station owned by the Bounty Museum Trust broadcasting from Norfolk Island. The station is a member of ACMA (Australian Communication and Media Authority) and APRA AMCOS (Australasian Performing Right Association and Australasian Mechanical Copyright Owners Society).

== Legacy ==
The presence of the museum has also been cited as part of a movement on the island to consolidate and emphasise its unique identity.

The book Dark Paradise by Robert Macklin published in July 2013 was written in the Bounty Museum.

== See also ==
- Norfolk Island Museum
- Pitcairn Island Museum
