= Norfuk language =

Official language of Norfolk Island

Norfolk
- Norfuk, Norf'k
- Pronunciation: [nɔːfuk]
- Region: Norfolk Island and Lord Howe Island
- Native speakers: 2,000 (2002–2017); 6 on Lord Howe Island
- Language family: English–Tahitian creole: Pitkern–Norfuk; Norfolk
- Writing system: Latin (Norfolk/Pitcairnese alphabet)

Official status
- Official language in: Norfolk Island

Language codes
- ISO 639-3: pih Pitcairn-Norfolk
- Glottolog: pitc1234 Pitcairn-Norfolk
- Linguasphere: 52-ABB-dd
- IETF: pih-NF
- Percentage of people in each Australian Bureau of Statistics (ABS) statistical area 1 (SA1) of Norfolk Island who reported speaking Norfuk/Pitkern at home in the 2021 census. 20-25% 25-30% 30-35% 35-40% Over 70% (Norfolk Island Airport only) Uninhabited

- Norfolk is classified as Definitely Endangered by the UNESCO Atlas of the World's Languages in Danger.

Norfuk (Pitcairn-Norfolk: Norfuk) (increasingly spelt Norfolk) or Norf'k is the language spoken on Norfolk Island (in the Pacific Ocean) by the local residents. It is a blend of 18th-century English and Tahitian, originally introduced by Pitkern-speaking settlers from the Pitcairn Islands. Along with English, it is the co-official language of Norfolk Island.

Norfuk has always been a linguistic cant. As travel to and from Norfolk Island becomes more common, Norfuk is falling into disuse. However, efforts are being made in recent years to restore the language to more common usage, such as the education of children, the publication of English–Norfuk dictionaries, the use of the language in signage, and the renaming of some tourist attractions – most notably the rainforest walk "A Trip Ina Stik" – to their Norfuk equivalents. In 2007, the United Nations added Norfuk to its list of endangered languages.

== History ==
In the 1970s, the Norfolk community and specialists from mainland Australia noted that the Norfuk language was falling into decline, prompting discussions about how to implement Norfolk into the school system. At this point in time, Norfuk did not have a standardized writing system, as it was mostly an oral language. The Society of the Descendants of Pitcairn Islanders, founded in 1977, was a driving force behind the campaign to include Norfuk language as a teachable subject in schools. Faye Bataille was one of the first to teach Norfolk classes in public schools, in the 1980s.

The first Norfolk dictionary was compiled in 1986 by Beryl Nobbs-Palmer. It was titled A Dictionary of Norfolk words and usages and contained examples of words in the Norfuk language and how to use them.

The book Speak Norfuk Today was written by Alice Buffett and Dr Donald Laycock. It is an encyclopedia incorporating a large majority of the information about the Norfuk language and was one of the first instances in which the orthography of Norfuk was documented.

Norfuk became a language of Norfolk Island in 2004 by virtue of the Norfolk Island Language (Norf'k) Act 2004 passed by the island's legislative assembly.

In 2018, Eve Semple and colleagues received a grant from the Australian Research Council, in order to promote and facilitate revival.

== Relationship to Pitkern ==
Norfuk is descended predominantly from the Pitkern (Pitcairnese or Pi'kern) spoken by settlers from the Pitcairn Islands. The relative ease of travel from English-speaking countries such as Australia and New Zealand to Norfolk Island, particularly when compared with that of travel to the Pitcairn Islands, has meant that Norfuk has been exposed to much greater contact with English relative to Pitkern. The difficulties in accessing the Pitcairn population have meant that a serious comparison of the two languages for mutual intelligibility has proven difficult.

== Classification ==
Norfuk has been classified as an Atlantic Creole language, despite the island's location in the Pacific Ocean, because of the heavy influence of Ned Young, a Saint Kitts Creole–speaker, and his role as a "linguistic socializer" among the first generation of children born on Pitcairn.

The language is closely related to Pitkern but has no other close relatives other than its parent tongues of English and Tahitian. It is generally considered that English has had more of an influence upon the language than Tahitian, with words of Tahitian extraction being confined largely to taboo subjects, negative characterisations, and adjectives indicating that something is undesirable.

Many expressions which are not commonly used in contemporary English carry on in Pitkern. These expressions include words from British maritime culture in the age of sailing ships. The influence of Seventh-day Adventist missionaries and the King James Version of the Bible are also notable.

In the mid-19th century, the people of Pitcairn resettled on Norfolk Island; later, some moved back. Most speakers of Pitkern today are the descendants of those who stayed. Pitkern and Norfuk dialects are mutually intelligible, but differ significantly in vocabulary and grammar.

The Norfolk language uses the subject–verb–object (SVO) basic word order.

== Phonology ==
Vowels
One target sounds		Two target sounds
group 1	group 2	Two target sounds
i	e	ʌʊ
ɪ	o	ɑɪ
ɛ		ɔɪ
æ		
ɑ		
ɒ		
ɔ		
ʊ		
u		
ɜ		
ʌ		

== Orthography ==
The language is largely a spoken rather than written language, and there is a lack of standardisation. However, a number of attempts have been made at developing an orthography for the language. Early attempts either attempted to enforce English spelling onto the Norfuk words, or used diacritical marks to represent sounds distinct to the language.

Alice Buffett, a Norfolk Island parliamentarian and Australian-trained linguist, developed a codified grammar and orthography for the language in the 1980s, assisted by Dr Donald Laycock, an Australian National University academic. Their book, Speak Norfuk Today, was published in 1988. This orthography has won the endorsement of the Norfolk Island government, and its use is becoming prevalent.

== Vocabulary ==
The language itself does not have words to express some concepts, particularly those having to do with science and technology. Some Islanders believe that the only solution is to create a committee charged with creating new words in Norfuk rather than simply adopting English words for new technological advances. For example, Norfuk recently adopted the word kompyuuta, a Norfuk-ised version of computer. Processes similar to this exist in relation to other languages around the world, such as the Māori language in New Zealand and the Faroese and Icelandic languages. Some languages already have official bodies, such as New Zealand's Māori Language Commission or France's Académie française, for creating new words.

Norfuk vocabulary has been heavily influenced by the history of Norfolk Island. Many words were created for specific animals or plants on the island and the way in which these things are named is unique to the island. For example, many fish that are indigenous to the island were named either by the people who caught them or by whoever received them after dividing the catch. One such instance is the naming of the fish Sandford which received its name by a man named Sandford Warren after receiving the fish as his share. Another example is the local Norfuk word for the sacred kingfisher, which is called by locals on Norfolk Island Nuffka, deriving from the Pitcairn word for Norfolker.

== Personal pronouns ==
Norfuk pronouns
	Subject	Object	Possessive	Predicate
1SG	ai	mii	mais	main
2SG	yu	yuu	yus	yoen
3SG.MASC	hi	hem	his	
3SG.FEM	shi	her		hers
1DU.EXCL.MASC	miienhem		auwas	miienhis
1DU.EXCL.FEM	miienher		auwas	miienhers
1DU.INCL	himii		himiis	
2DU	yutuu		yutuus	
3DU	demtuu		demtuus	
1PL	wi	aklan	auwas	
2PL	yorlyi		yorlyis	
3PL	dem		dems	

There is also et for 'it' in its object form.

== See also ==
- Languages of Norfolk Island
