= Pitkern =

Language spoken on Pitcairn Islands

- Pitkern–Norfolk; Pitcairn–Norfolk
- Native to: Norfolk Island, Pitcairn Islands, New Zealand
- Ethnicity: Pitcairn Islanders
- Native speakers: c. 400 Pitcairn-Norfolk (2008); 36 on Pitcairn (2002)
- Language family: English–Tahitian creole: Pitkern–Norfuk; Pitkern
- Dialects: Norfuk
- Writing system: Latin (Norfolk/Pitcairnese alphabet)

Official status
- Official language in: Pitcairn Islands

Language codes
- ISO 639-3: pih Pitcairn-Norfolk
- Glottolog: pitc1234 Pitcairn-Norfolk
- ELP: Pitcairn-Norfolk
- Linguasphere: 52-ABB-dd
- IETF: pih-PN
- Pitcairn is classified as Vulnerable by the UNESCO Atlas of the World's Languages in Danger.

Pitkern, also known as Pitcairn-Norfolk or Pitcairnese, is a creole spoken on Pitcairn and Norfolk islands. It is a mixture of English and Tahitian, and has been given many classifications by scholars, including cant, patois, and Atlantic creole. Although spoken on Pacific Ocean islands, it has been described as an Atlantic or semi-Atlantic creole due to the lack of connections with other English-based creoles of the Pacific. There are fewer than 50 speakers on Pitcairn Island, a number which has been steadily decreasing since 1971.

== History ==
Following the Mutiny on the Bounty on 28 April 1789, the British mutineers stopped at Tahiti and took 18 Polynesians captive, mostly women, to remote Pitcairn Island and settled there. A pidgin was formed based on English and Tahitian so that the English mutineers could communicate with the Tahitian women they brought to the previously uninhabited Pitcairn Island. The Pitkern language was influenced by the diverse English dialects and accents of the crew. Geographically, the mutineers were drawn from as far as the West Indies, with one mutineer being described as speaking a forerunner of a Caribbean patois (Saint Kitts Creole). One was a Scot from the Isle of Lewis. At least one, the leader Fletcher Christian, was a well-educated man, which at the time made a major difference in speech. Both Geordie and West Country dialects have obvious links to some Pitkern phrases and words, such as whettles, meaning food, from victuals.

The first children born on Pitcairn Island mainly spoke a mixture of non-standard varieties of English and the contact language. In the 1830s, Pitkern's local prestige increased, and the language started to be used in church and school. In 1856, 194 residents of Pitcairn Island moved to Norfolk Island, where many residents continued to use Pitkern in their households.

After 1914, the Australian government tried to end the use of Pitkern/Norf'k by restricting its use in public spaces.

== Relationship to Norf'k ==
Norf'k is descended predominantly from Pitkern. When the residents of Pitcairn Island moved to Norfolk Island, they brought the language with them. The language developed and changed over time. The relative ease of travel from English-speaking countries such as Australia, New Zealand or Papua New Guinea to Norfolk Island, particularly when compared with that of travel to the Pitcairn Islands, has meant that Norf'k has been exposed to much greater contact with English relative to Pitkern. The difficulties in accessing the Pitcairn population have meant that a serious comparison of the two languages for mutual intelligibility has proven difficult.

The exact relationship between these two languages is a point of contention for scholars. Some believe that the difference between Pitkern and Norf'k is negligible, while others believe that Standard English is more present in Norf'k than it is in Pitkern.

== Common phrases ==
Pronouns included aklen, commonly spelled uklun 'we/us' (or just 'us', with wi for 'we'); hami 'you and I' / 'you and us', and yoli 'you (plural)'.

Pitkern	English
Wut a way ye?	How are you?
About ye gwen?	Where are you going?
You gwen whihi up suppa?	Are you going to cook supper?
I nor believe.	I don't think so.
Ye like-a sum whettles?	Would you like some food?
Do' mine.	It doesn't matter. I don't mind.
Wa sing yourley doing?	What are you doing? What are you up to?
I se gwen ah big shep.	I'm going to the ship.
Humuch shep corl ya?	How often do ships come here?
Cum yorley sulluns!	Come on all you kids!
I se gwen ah nahweh.	I'm going swimming.
Lebbe!	Let it be!
Gude!	Good!
You same as tingi!	You beggar!
What-thing that?/Wasing daa?	What is that?
Blue as a pai-pai	Very homesick

Note: Pitkern spelling is not standardised.

== Excerpts from a transcription of Pitkern ==
The sentences below are excerpted from a longer dialogue held in 1951 between a teenage speaker of Pitkern and A.W. Moverley, a foreigner who worked as a schoolteacher on Pitcairn during the mid-20th century. The dialogue was recorded by Moverley and later transcribed in the International Phonetic Alphabet by A.C. Gimson, with translations to English provided by Moverley.

Pitkern transcription	wɒtəwɛi	ju
English cognates	what way	you
Translation	"How are	you (sg.)?"

Pitkern transcription	ai	filen	sɪkɪ
English cognates	I	feeling	sick
Translation	"I’m	feeling	sick."

Pitkern transcription	ai	bɪn	sɔ	sɪns	jɛstəde	ha	ʔʌdəwʌn	ha	ʔʌdəwʌn
English cognates	I	been	sore	since	yesterday	the	other one	the	other one
Translation	"I’ve	been	ill	for the past three days."

Pitkern transcription	aɪ	sə	brɪŋ	wʌn	a	wækl	lʊŋfə	mi
English cognates	I		bring	one	of	victuals	along for	me
Translation	"I’ve	brought		some		food	for myself with me."

Pitkern transcription	aɪ	bɪn	teʔk	wʌn	aɪ	teɪtə	pilʌ	ɪn	a	plʌnz	lif
English cognates	I	been	take	one	I	tater	[Tahitian: "type of pudding"]	in	a	plantain's	leaf
Translation	"I’ve	brought		myself some		potato	pie	in	a	banana	leaf."

Pitkern transcription	jɔːle	maːmuː
English cognates	you all you	[Tahitian: "silence"]
Translation	"You (pl.)	be quiet!"

Pitkern transcription	dʌnə	maːlou
English cognates	do not	[Tahitian: "obstinate"]
Translation	"Don't	argue!"

Pitkern transcription	jɔːlə	paɪl	e	pipl	kaː	wosiŋ	jɔle	toːkm	əbæʊʔt
English cognates	you all you	pile	of	people	can't	what thing	you all you	talking	about
Translation	"You (pl.)	lot			don't know	what	you're	talking	about."

Pitkern transcription	jɔːle	dʌnə	toːk
English cognates	you all you	do not	talk
Translation	"You (pl.)	stop	talking!"

Pitkern transcription	jus	ə	get	aʊ	flaʊə	ʔaʊʔt	ʃɛʔp
English cognates	us		get	our	flour	out	ship
Translation	"We		get	our	bags of flour	from	ships."

== Poetry in Pitkern ==
Some poetry exists in Pitkern. The poems of Meralda Warren are of particular note.

== See also ==
- Australian English
- Norfolk Island
- Pitcairn Islands
- Norfuk language
