= Prime Air =

Prime Air may refer to:

- Amazon Air, a US cargo airline based in Cincinnati, Ohio, operating under the callsign "Prime Air"
- Amazon Prime Air, Amazon's drone delivery service
- Prime Airlines, a defunct British airline
