= OzJet =

Airline of Australia (2005–2012)

IATA	ICAO	Call sign
O7	OZJ	AUSJET
- Founded: 2005
- Ceased operations: 2012
- Hubs: Perth Airport
- Fleet size: 4
- Destinations: 2
- Parent company: Strategic Group
- Headquarters: Melbourne, Victoria, Australia
- Key people: Michael James (Executive Director)
- Website: www.ozjet.com.au

Ozjet Airlines Pty Ltd was a scheduled and charter airline with its head office in Tullamarine, Melbourne, Australia operating within Australasia from Melbourne Airport, Sydney Airport and Perth Airport. In 2008 the airline was sold to HeavyLift Cargo Airlines, and on 20 May 2009 it suspended its last remaining operations from Perth. In June 2009, OzJet was purchased by the Strategic Group. With the insolvency of Strategic Airlines on 17 February 2012 also OzJet ceased all operations.

== History ==
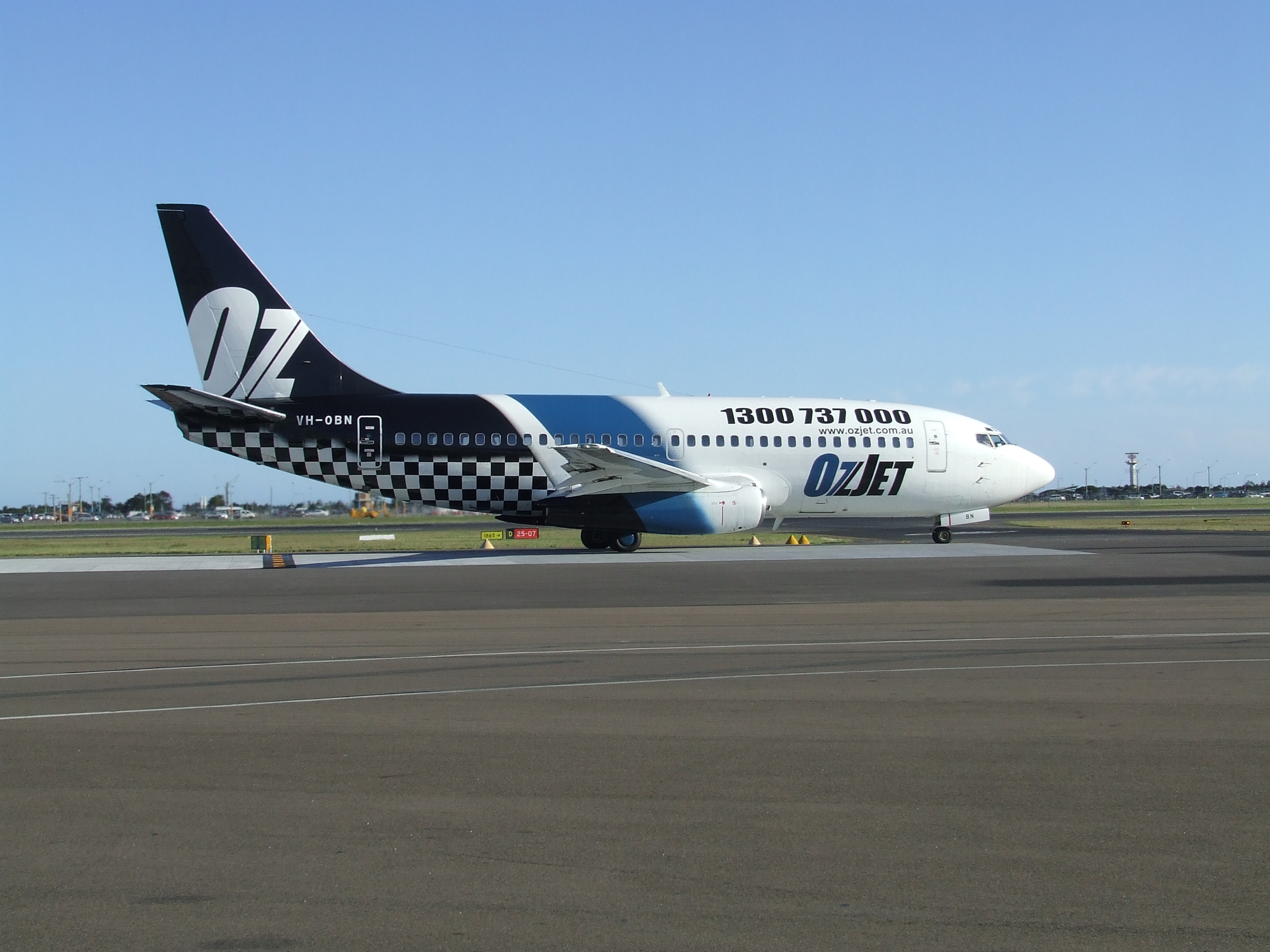
OzJet Boeing 737-200 at Sydney Airport.

Ozjet was first registered as a trademark to Peter Schott, a Metroliner pilot from New South Wales studying for his Master of Business Administration at Swinburne University in Melbourne in 2002. When the Paul Stoddart announced the idea of a low-cost domestic regional airline, Ausjet Airlines Pty Ltd was formed. Schott and Stoddart realised the potential of adopting the Ozjet name and did so. In 2004 the original Ozjet Airlines Pty Ltd was deregistered and Ausjet Airlines Pty Ltd became Ozjet Airlines Pty Ltd. Peter Schott was initially the chief operating officer, then replaced by David Blake in late 2005.

Following its pre-application meeting on 10 June 2005, Ozjet was granted an airworthiness certificate for its first jet on 28 October 2005. After a number of delays Ozjet was granted an Air Operator's Certificate by the Civil Aviation Safety Authority on 11 November 2005. On 29 November 2005 OzJet commenced operations, flying eight scheduled return services per day between Melbourne and Sydney using Boeing 737-200 aircraft transferred from Paul Stoddart's European Aviation in business class configuration of 60 seats. OzJet intended to expand its fleet with up to seven further Boeing 737s and four British Aerospace 146s to expand its network to include Brisbane, Canberra, Adelaide and Perth. Ozjet's motto was "You're in Business", reflecting its marketing and product focus on business travellers. OzJet wanted to attain a market share of no more than 10% of the business market from competitors Qantas, Virgin Blue and Jetstar.

Initially the airline offered its business class seats in its three aircraft at fares similar to those of fully flexible economy class seats of its competitors. Faced with poor loads on its services (due in part to not commencing operations until just before the start of the Christmas holiday period in Australia), it had to soon resort to discounting, including "two seats-for-the-price-of-one" offers. On many of the carrier's flights, there were more flight attendants than actual passengers. The low patronage problems continued and in December 2005 the airline commenced offering charter flights.

In March 2006, OzJet chairman Paul Stoddart announced that OzJet would cease all scheduled operations. All stranded passengers were given flights with Qantas (economy) and all other booked fares were given full refunds, and an opportunity to book a matching flight with Qantas at the same price.

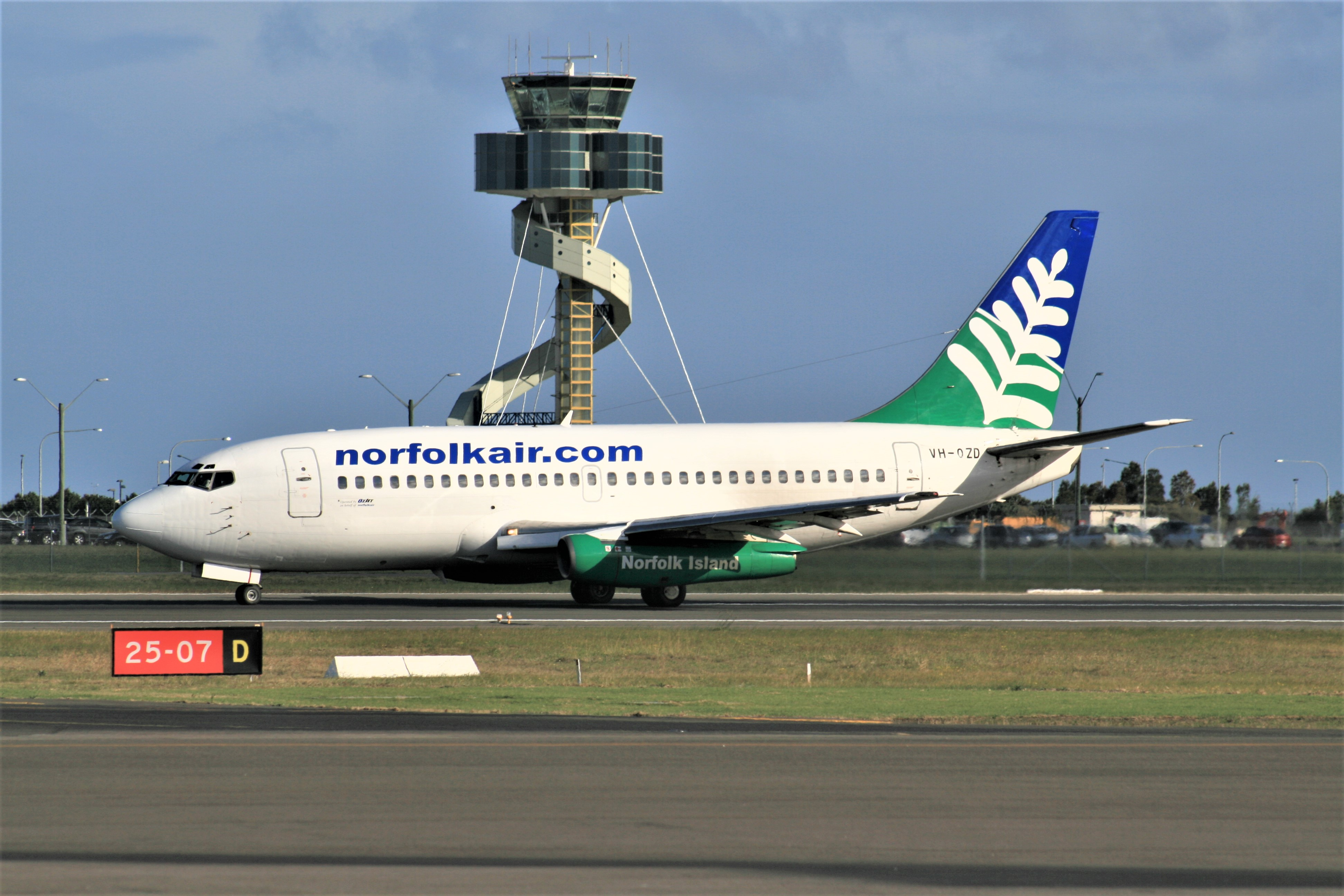
Ex OzJet Boeing 737-200 in Norfolk Air livery at Sydney Airport

On 16 May 2006, OzJet was announced as taking over operating the regular service from Australia to Norfolk Island, replacing Air Nauru from 24 May 2006. The main aircraft used on this service was configured for 108 seats (8 of which were "Bounty Class") and ticketed by Qantas and Norfolk Air. The services operated several days a week operating from the Norfolk Island base to Sydney, Melbourne, Brisbane and Newcastle for Norfolk Air.

On 21 August 2006 the airline began scheduled operations on behalf of Airlines PNG between Brisbane and Port Moresby. As of November 2007 these services were operating three times a week, originating in Brisbane each operating day.

In February 2007 OzJet recommenced scheduled flights, operating between Perth and Derby, Western Australia three times each week. In September the same year Ozjet commenced charter flights from Perth to Bali, Indonesia, operating on behalf of travel agency IndoJet, initially twice each week, subsequently increasing to four times per week. In October 2007 Ozjet announced that subject to regulatory approval it would commence regular services connecting Palmerston North in New Zealand with the Australian ports of Melbourne, Sydney and Brisbane; but decided in March 2008, just four days before the first scheduled flights, that the service would not go ahead, leaving hundreds of travellers in limbo without any information or official contact from OzJet.

In May 2008, Paul Stoddart sold his 97.4% stake in OzJet to HeavyLift Cargo Airlines. The new chairman of OzJet, HeavyLift's Nick Leach, was reported as saying that the Boeing 737-200s would be replaced with newer and more fuel efficient 737-300 and 737-400s.

In October 2008 the Manawatu Standard reported that Ozjet was in talks with Palmerston North Airport; to discuss Ozjet commencing the services from Australia to Palmerston North that had been abandoned at the time of the HeavyLift sale. In late 2008 Ozjet's services to Port Moresby on behalf of Airlines PNG ceased when Pacific Blue Airlines commenced code-share flights on 3 November.

On 29 April 2009 Norfolk Air CEO Jeff Murdoch announced that, following a decision by Ozjet to immediately end charter services to the island, Our Airline would be taking over all charter services on behalf of Norfolk Air. Following the grounding of OzJet's fleet, air services between Perth and Derby were restored with Fokker 100 aircraft chartered from Alliance Airlines. On 21 May 2009 OzJet was placed in administration and sold to Strategic Airlines. With the insolvency of Strategic Airlines on 17 February 2012 also OzJet ceased all operations.

From 3 February 2011 to 7 February 2011, flights on Strategic Airlines' website for Townsville to Denpasar (Bali) from 9 April 2011 showed as flight number O7 228. This used Ozjet Airlines IATA airline designator prefix of O7 instead of Strategic Airlines' own VC.

== Destinations ==
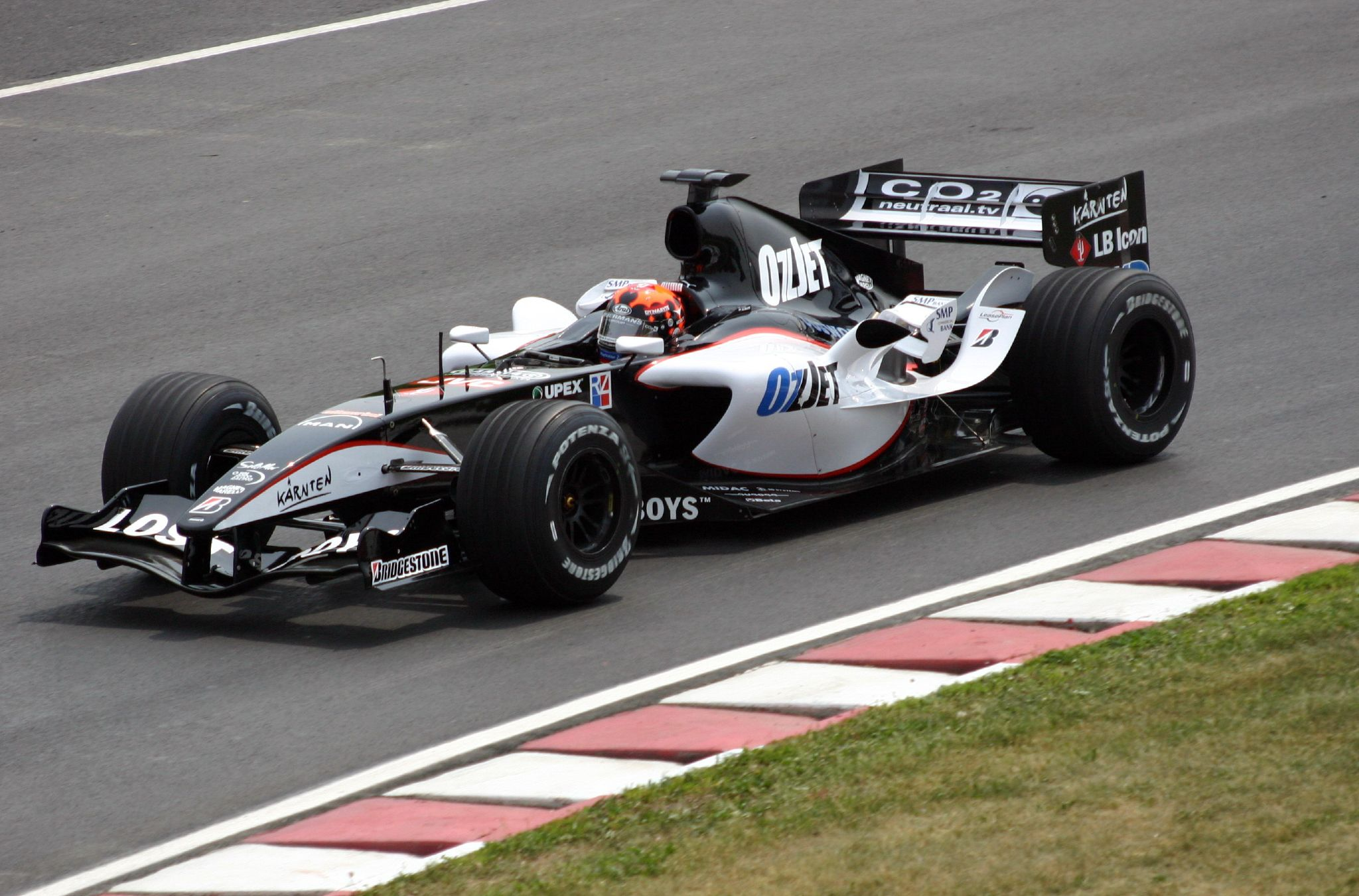
A Minardi Formula One car running with OzJet sponsorship in 2005

In November 2009, Ozjet's services reduced to just one route, with services flown by Alliance Airlines:

- Perth to Derby

=== Former services ===
- Ozjet previously operated its own scheduled domestic services between Melbourne and Sydney. It also operated services on behalf of other airlines and travel companies:
- On behalf of Airlines PNG
  - Brisbane to Port Moresby, Papua New Guinea
- On behalf of IndoJet
  - Perth to Denpasar, Indonesia
- On behalf of AIOTA
  - Perth to Christmas Island
- On behalf of Norfolk Air
  - Brisbane to Norfolk Island
  - Melbourne to Norfolk Island
  - Newcastle to Norfolk Island
  - Sydney to Norfolk Island
