= Norfolk Air =

Airline of Norfolk Island, Australia (2006–2012)

IATA	ICAO	Call sign
N5	NFK	NORFIK AIR
- Founded: May 2006
- Ceased operations: 26 February 2012
- Hubs: Norfolk Island Airport
- Alliance: Codeshare with Qantas Airways (Oneworld)
- Parent company: Norfolk Island Government
- Key people: Jeff Murdoch (CEO)
- Website: www.norfolkair.com

Norfolk Air was an airline based on Norfolk Island, an external territory of Australia. It was owned by the Administration of Norfolk Island, with flights operated by Our Airline.

The airline provided services between Norfolk Island Airport and Sydney, Brisbane, Newcastle and Melbourne. As Norfolk Island was outside of the Australian migration zone, flights were required to depart from international terminals at each airport and passengers were required to carry a document of identity or passport.

== History ==
The airline began operations in May 2006, initially operating services between Norfolk Island and Brisbane and Sydney, with flights subsequently added on a weekly basis from Newcastle in May 2007 and from Melbourne in November 2007. All services were operated by OzJet until May 2009 when Our Airline commenced flying on Norfolk Air's behalf using Boeing 737-300 aircraft. One was painted in Norfolk Air's livery. Our Airline provided the aircraft and technical crew for the operations, while Norfolk Air provided the cabin crew, with all cabin crew being residents of Norfolk Island.

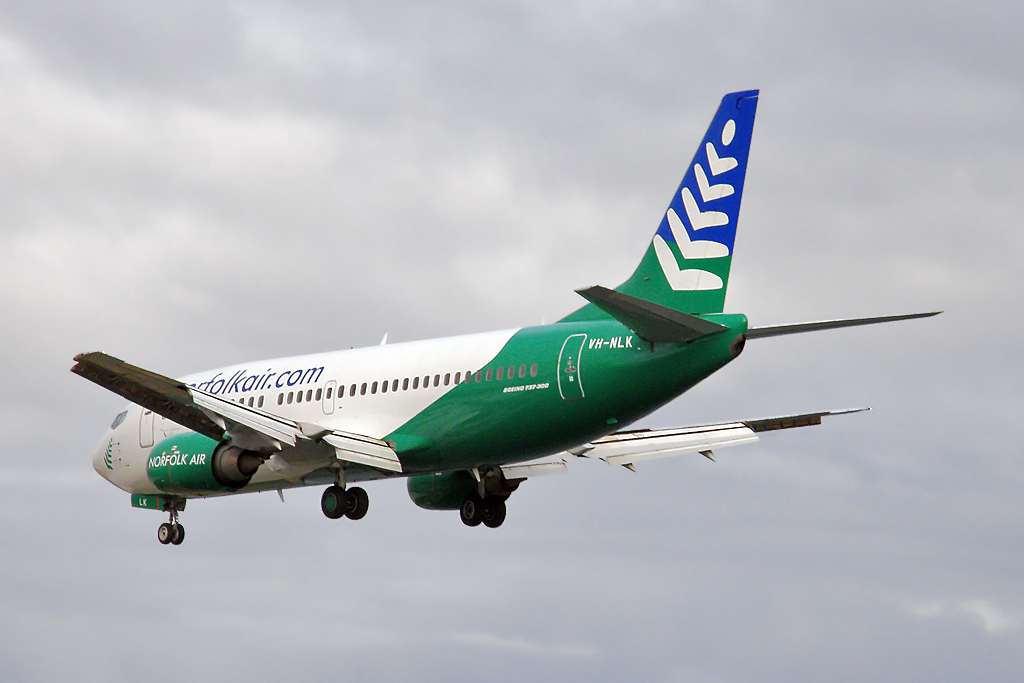
Norfolk Air Boeing 737-300 landing at Sydney Airport from Norfolk Island

In April 2009 OzJet announced its decision to terminate charter services on behalf of Norfolk Air with immediate effect. Subsequently, Norfolk Air announced that Our Airline would begin operating all Norfolk Air services ahead of the changeover already planned for May 2009.

On 24 December 2011 the Norfolk Island Government decided to withdraw services, with the final flight operating on 26 February 2012. Air New Zealand took over services between the Australian mainland and Norfolk Island on 6 March 2012, operating from Sydney and Brisbane using Airbus A320 aircraft.

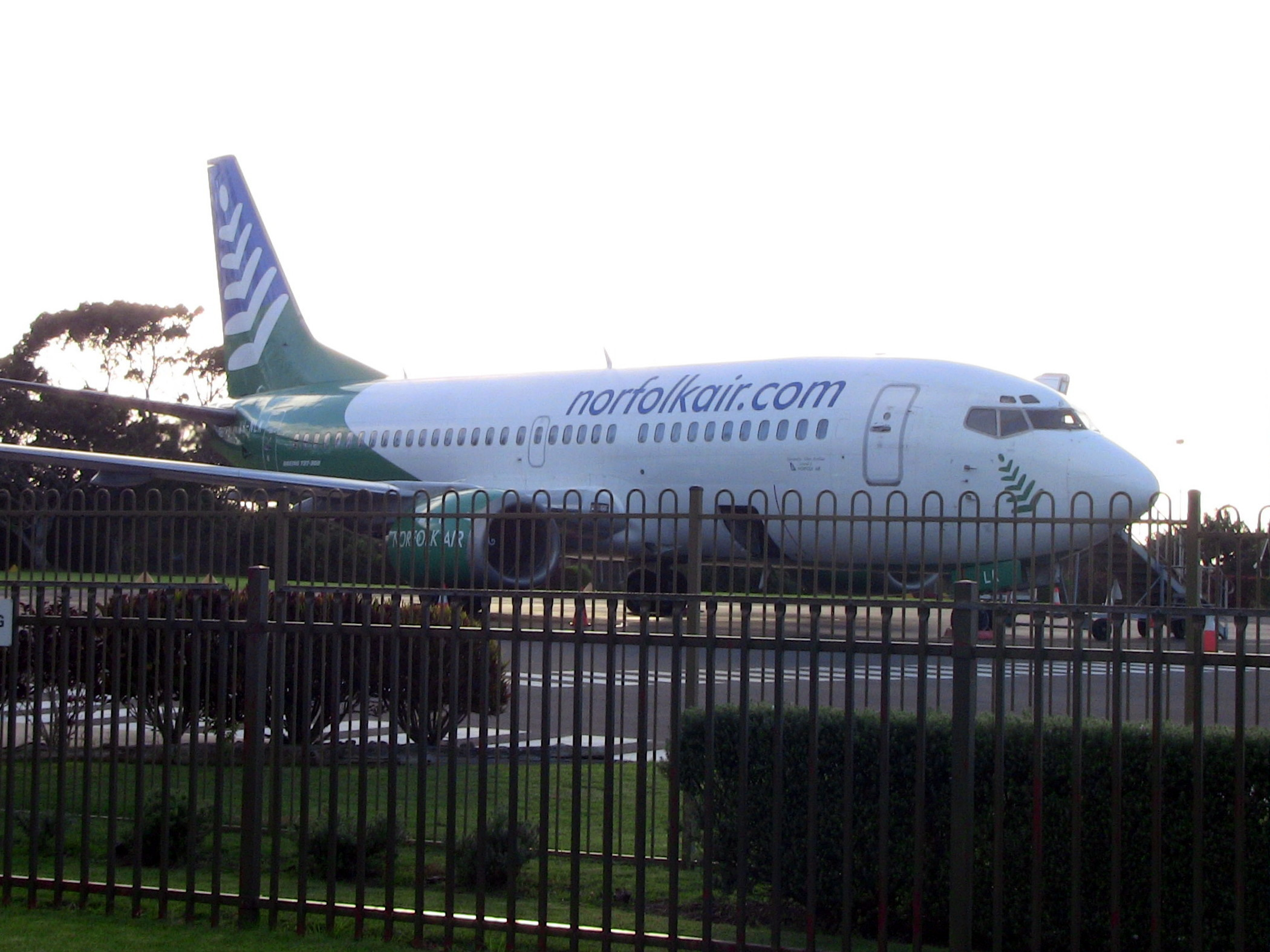
Norfolk Air Boeing 737-300 at Norfolk Island Airport, prior to departure for Brisbane in January 2012.

== Destinations ==
Norfolk Air operated from its base at Norfolk Island Airport to Brisbane, Melbourne, Newcastle and Sydney.

== Fleet ==
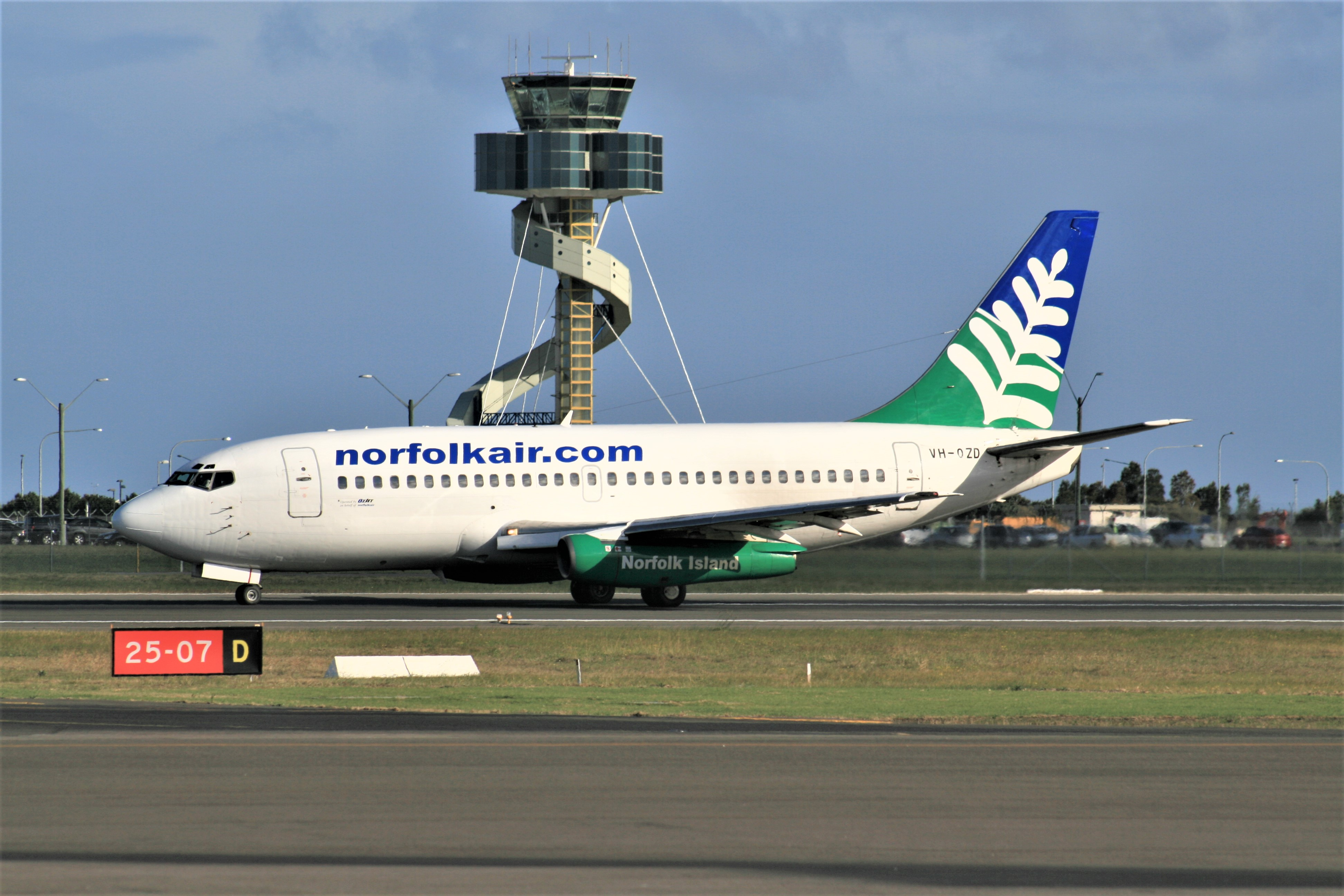
Norfolk Air Boeing 737-200 at Sydney Airport

Norfolk Air operated a Boeing 737-200 from the beginning until February 2009, when Our Airline retired the 737-200. Norfolk Air then operated a 737-300. As of May 2009, the Norfolk Air fleet included:

Aircraft	In service	Orders	Passengers	Notes
Boeing 737-300	1	—	149	Operated by Our Airline
Total	1	—		

== See also ==
- List of defunct airlines of Australia
- Aviation in Australia
