= Short Belfast =

Heavy lift turboprop freighter

Belfast
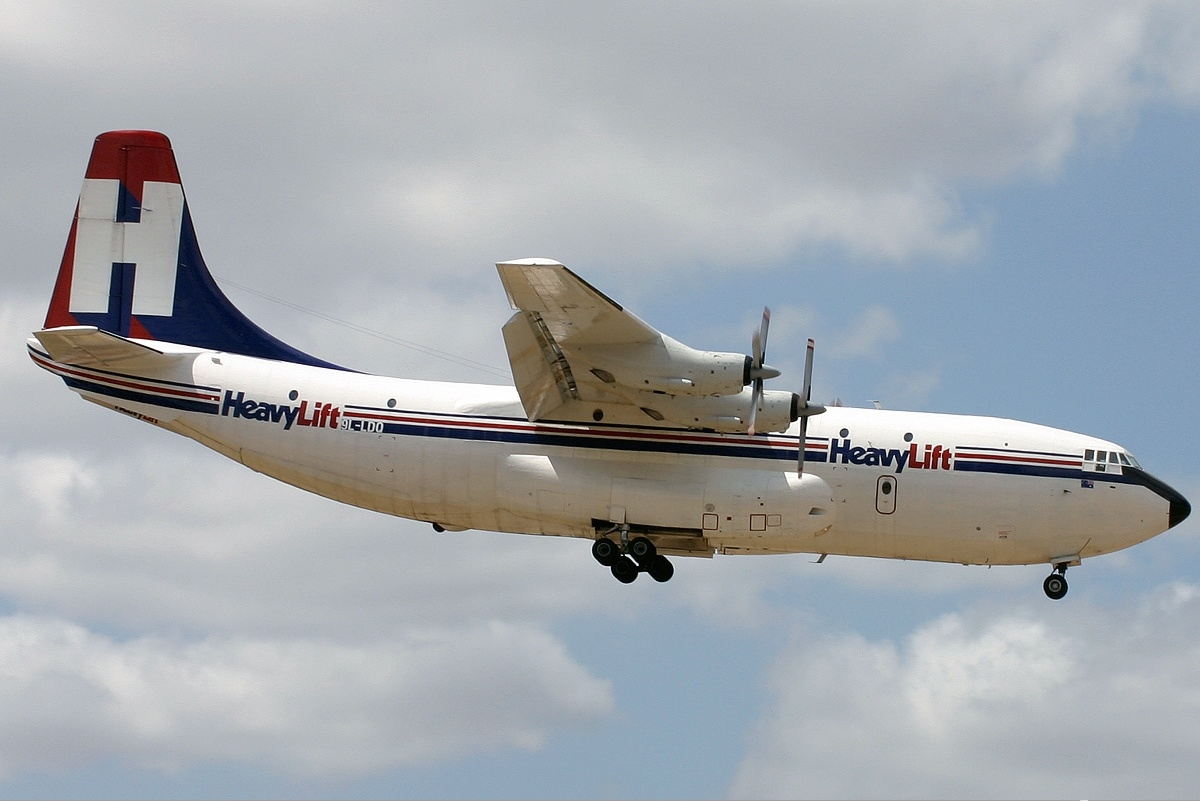
- Belfast of HeavyLift Cargo Airlines lands at Perth Airport (2004)

General information
- Type: Heavy airfreighter
- Manufacturer: Short Brothers
- Status: Retired
- Primary users: Royal Air Force HeavyLift Cargo Airlines
- Number built: 10

History
- Manufactured: 1964–1968
- Introduction date: 20 January 1966
- First flight: 5 January 1964
- Retired: from RAF service 1976

The Short Belfast (or Shorts Belfast) is a retired heavy lift turboprop freighter that was built by British manufacturer Short Brothers at Belfast. Only 10 aircraft were constructed, all of which entered service with the Royal Air Force (RAF), who operated it under the designation Short Belfast C.1.

Upon its entry into service, the Belfast was the largest aircraft that the British military had ever operated up to that time. It was also notable for being the first aircraft to be designed from the outset to be equipped with full 'blind landing' automatic landing system equipment. Following the formation of RAF Strike Command and a reorganisation of transport assets, the RAF decided to retire all of its Belfast transports by the end of 1976.

Shortly after the type had been retired by the RAF, five Belfasts were sold and entered civilian service with the cargo airline HeavyLift. HeavyLift used the aircraft for charter transport, including flights for the RAF. One Belfast is on display at the Royal Air Force Museum Midlands.

== Development ==
=== Origins ===
The Belfast has its origins in studies conducted by aircraft manufacturer Short Brothers into the possibility for matching an arrangement of four Bristol Orion turboprop engines with an airframe that had been optimised for the purpose of transporting various military stores during the mid-1950s. It was decided to continue these studies as part of the firm's management believed that it was highly likely that there would likely be an Operational Requirement issued for the Royal Air Force (RAF) seeking such an aircraft in the near future, although Sir Matthew Slattery, chairman of Shorts, expressed his doubt of the practicality of such an aircraft. Slattery believed that developing such an aircraft from scratch would lack sufficient market prospects and instead encouraged the use of as many components and systems from the existing Bristol Britannia transport aircraft as would be reasonably possible, a measure that was seen as logical and practical, acting to reduce development time and cost while improving reliability, with the downside of lesser performance.

In March 1957, Shorts submitted its first brochure on their proposed transport aircraft, designated as the PD.18 and given the name Britannic to reflect its Britannia ancestry. The PD.18 only differed from the Britannia in terms of its fuselage and high-mounting of its wings; the wings themselves, along with the tail unit, engines, and major portions of the landing gear and various other systems were common to both types. The new circular cross-section fuselage was very large for the era, capable of accommodating a 12-ft-square load for the carriage of bulky loads such as radar units and the Blue Streak medium-range ballistic missile (MRBM); it also allows for troops to be carried across two separate decks.

During 1957, it became clear that there was a definite need within the RAF for a heavy freighter. Accordingly, the issuing of Operational Requirement ASR.371 soon occurred, which sought the procurement freighter capable of carrying a wide range of military payloads over long ranges. The envisioned aircraft was to be operated by Transport Command of the RAF. The military loads envisaged included artillery, more than 200 troops, helicopters, and guided missiles. In particular, the RAF issued an increased payload/range demand of 30,000 lb being carried over a distance of 3,600 n.m, greater than the Service had originally been considering.

To meet with the stated requirements, Shorts proceeded to develop their original proposal for the Britannic, which was basically stretched into the Britannic III A. As the design of the proposed aircraft was repeatedly revised, it had less and less in common with the earlier Britannia, incorporating a greater proportion of all-new components, sections, and systems. Amongst the changes made were a new centre section to the wing which added around 16 ft 6 in (5.03 m) to the span and the adoption of the Rolls-Royce Tyne engine. In January 1959, the Ministry announced its selection of Short's design to meet the requirement. Accordingly, in February 1959, work on the Short's project formally commenced, known by the internal designation SC.5/10. On 21 December 1960, a contract for a total of 10 freighters, designated Belfast C.1, was signed.

On 5 January 1964, the prototype Belfast had its maiden flight from Sydenham Airport, Belfast; chief test pilot Denis Taylor and a crew of six flew for 55 minutes. Following that flight, Taylor stated "It was the easiest ride I have had for a very long time... The aircraft was an absolute joy to fly. She's a beauty." The first two aircraft produced were equipped with dedicated flight-test instrumentation and were used to complete development trials, which totalled roughly 850 flight hours; certification was conducted to both RAF and Air Registration Board (ARB) requirements. The first autolanding was performed after only 120 hours' test flying, less than originally estimated.

On 5 October 1964, the first of three flying Belfasts departed Northern Ireland for Torrejón de Ardoz, the Community of Madrid, Spain, to participate in two weeks of performance trials; this was the first flight abroad performed by the type. According to Shorts Brothers Chairman, C. E Wrangham, the Belfast had a forecast break-even point of 30 aircraft. Despite the order for only ten aircraft, the decision had been made to assemble the aircraft using production jigs.

=== Proposed derivatives ===
Multiple derivatives of the Belfast were proposed by Short. Two principal civil versions of the aircraft, designated as SC5/10A and SC5/31, were mooted during the early 1960s. The SC5/10A was to have been a commercial freighter derived directly from the Belfast C.1, retaining much of its design such as its large rear loading doors for access to the main freight hold. The payload was to be increased to 85,000 lb (39 t); reportedly, up to 150 passengers could be seated on a single deck while up to 288 people could be seated across a double-deck configuration.

The second civil variant to be offered, the SC5/31, was to have featured a swinging nose arrangement for loading purposes in place of the rear door layout used upon the RAF model of the aircraft. It was claimed that both the payload and maximum takeoff weight would be considerably elevated above its predecessor. One proposed configuration for the SC5/31 was as a transatlantic airliner, carrying a maximum of 138 passengers on the top deck and up to 55,000 lb of palletised cargo on the lower deck; it was projected that it would be capable of flying a payload of 100,000 lb on the London-New York City route. During 1964, Short revealed that it had approached British European Airways (BEA) with its proposal for a large double-deck short-haul passenger version of the Belfast.

Additional military versions of the Belfast were proposed. The SC5/35 model was intended to be a strategic freighter capable of conducting very long range missions, while the SC5/15 was an envisioned tactical transport configuration, the latter of which was claimed to have required very little modification from the existing aircraft. A more advanced tactical airlifter, designated as SC5/21, was formulated to conform with the requirements of Operational Requirement OR.351, which was to have STOL (short takeoff/landing) capabilities. It was intended to harness a boundary layer control system, to have been powered by a removable pack of three Rolls-Royce Limited turbocompressors installed in a hump above the fuselage, which would have discharged high pressure air over the flaps and control surfaces of the tail and wings.

Perhaps one of the most extensive proposed modifications of the basic Belfast design, designated as SC.5/40, was to be done in partnership with the American aerospace firm Lockheed Corporation. For this variant, the fuselage of the Belfast would have been paired with the wing of the Lockheed C-141 Starlifter, which would have readily enabled the adoption of turbojet engines in place of the turboprops. Speculated engines to power this variant included the Pratt & Whitney JT3D-3 (18,000 1b thrust) or JT3D-8 (21,000 1b), Rolls-Royce Conway 550 (21,825 1b) or Bristol Siddeley BS.100 (27,000 1b approximately). A broadly similar but improved proposal, designated as SC.5/45, was heavily promoted by Shorts for Operational Requirement ASR.364, partly on the basis that it would also enable a near-identical civil-orientated model to be produced for home and export use, designated as SC.5/41. Detailed presentations on the SC.5/41 and SC.5/45 proposals were made to British Overseas Airways Corporation (BOAC) and RAF respectively, but no military order was forthcoming.

== Design ==
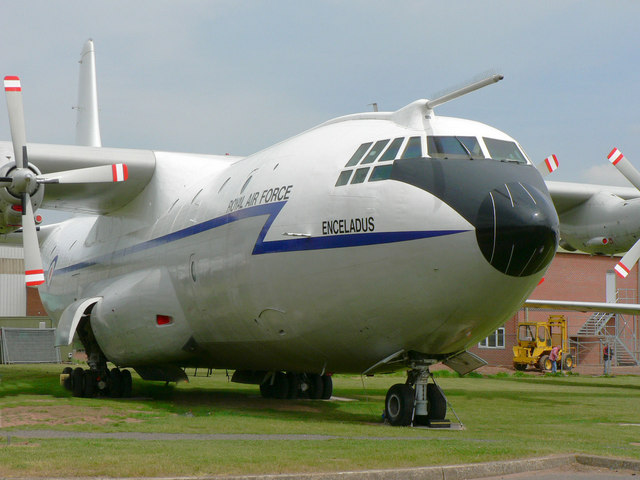
Belfast C.1 XR371 Enceladus preserved at Royal Air Force Museum Midlands

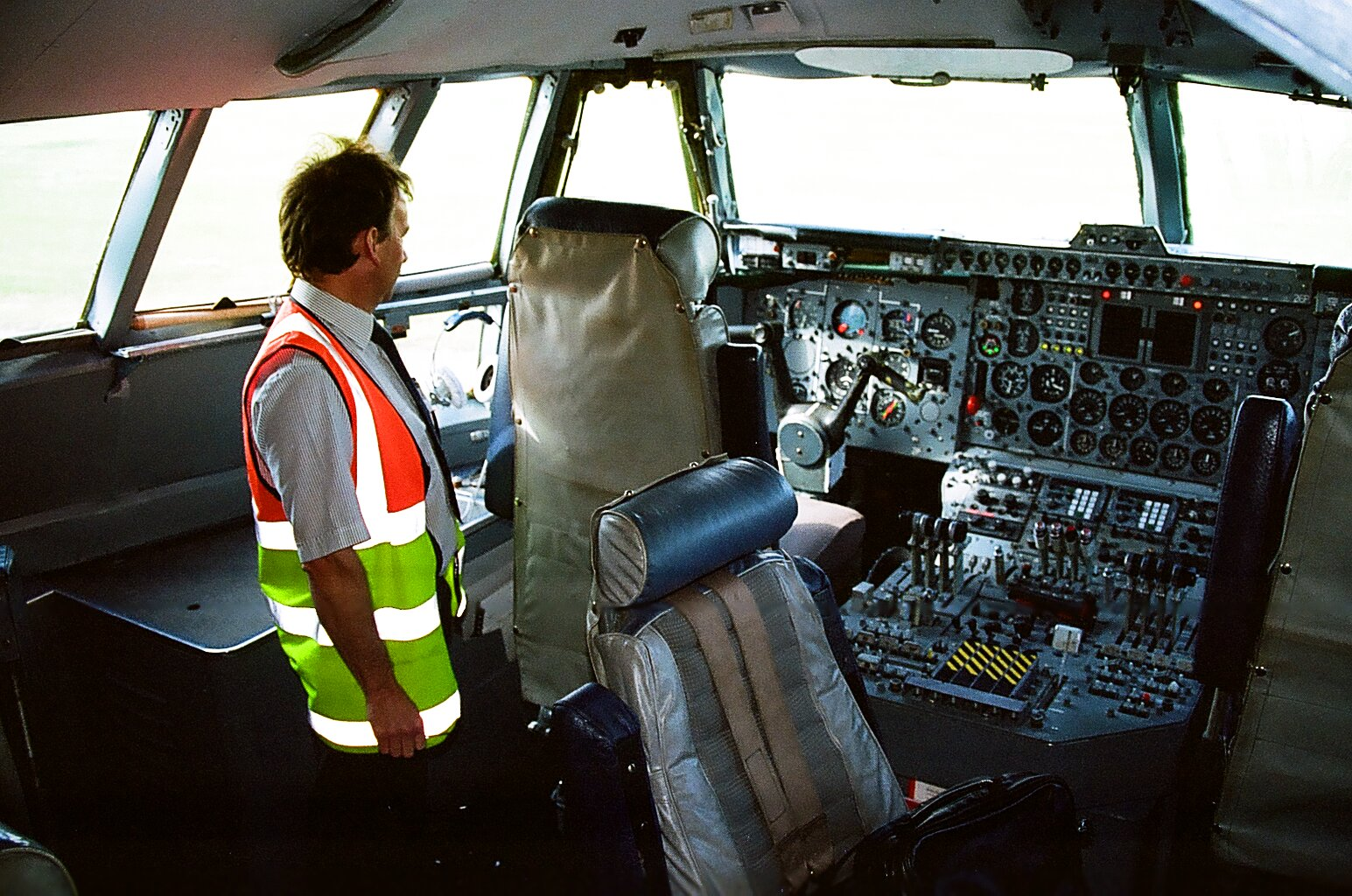
The spacious cockpit of the Short Belfast

The Short Belfast was a large heavy-lift strategic transport aircraft. It featured a high-mounted wing, which carried four Rolls-Royce Tyne turboprop engines. According to aerospace publication Flight International, the design of the assemblies of the surfaces of both the tail and wing of the Belfast had been derived from the Bristol Britannia. One of the major changes to the wing was its conversion to a wet wing, which was performed by Canadair. There are few other common elements between the Belfast and the Britannia, although there had been a much greater proportion intended during initial designs for the aircraft.

The fuselage of the Belfast was a relatively conservatively stressed cylinder of a conventional design. It was developed with a target safe-life of 15,000 pressure cycles, which was fatigued tested using a complete fuselage immersed in a water tank. Fail-safe principles were used in the design of the large side door, rear ramp and door. Rolled Z-sections were used throughout the majority of the fuselage frames and stringers, while box beams are used where the exertion of heavier-than-average loads had been typically anticipated; the structure lacks any use of forgings or machined members.

The flying controls of the Belfast incorporated numerous features developed by Bristol and Canadair, in addition to Shorts; all three companies had heavily collaborated on its development. It used the same manual servo-tab system as used on the Britannia, but had some advancements, especially in terms of lateral control via a simpler spoiler configuration. Other advancements include the linking of the port aileron to the rudder to counteract adverse rolling due to rudder deflection, and the elevator is linked to the flaps to cancel out trim changes caused by flap operations. The Belfast was equipped with a full automatic landing system, produced by Smiths Aerospace, the first aircraft in the world to be designed to feature such capability from the onset of development. The autopilot and flight control system, known as the ASR 518, was triplex in the roll and pitch channels, with duplex or emergency simplex ability. The instrument landing system comprised many functions, such as an autothrottle, a head-up display, and radio altimeter.

The cargo deck, 84 ft long (26 m) in a circular-section pressurized fuselage over 16 ft in diameter (4.9 m) (roomy enough for two single-deck buses), was reached through a "beaver tail" with rear loading doors and integral ramp. It was large enough that forklift trucks could work within the cargo hold. The main undercarriage was two eight-wheel bogies and a two-wheel nose. The Belfast was capable of a maximum takeoff weight (MTOW) of over 220,500 lb (100 tonnes) – less than the contemporaneous 250-tonne Antonov An-22 and the 128-tonne Douglas C-133 Cargomaster, but more than the Lockheed C-130 Hercules. It could carry 150 troops with full equipment or various vehicles, such as a single Chieftain tank, or up to three Alvis Saladin armoured cars, or a pair of Westland Wessex helicopters, or up to four Westland Whirlwind helicopters, or up to six Westland Wasp or Westland Scout helicopters, or a pair of Polaris submarine-launched ballistic missiles.

== Operational history ==
=== RAF service ===
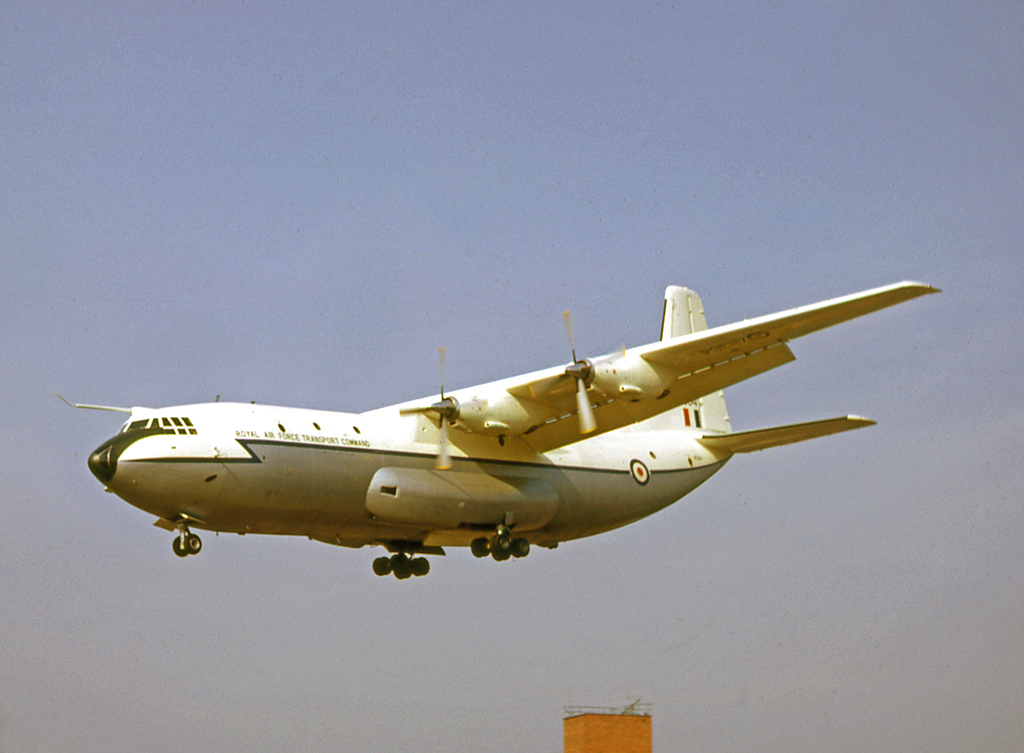
Belfast C.1 XR364 "Pallas" in service with No. 53 Squadron RAF Transport Command

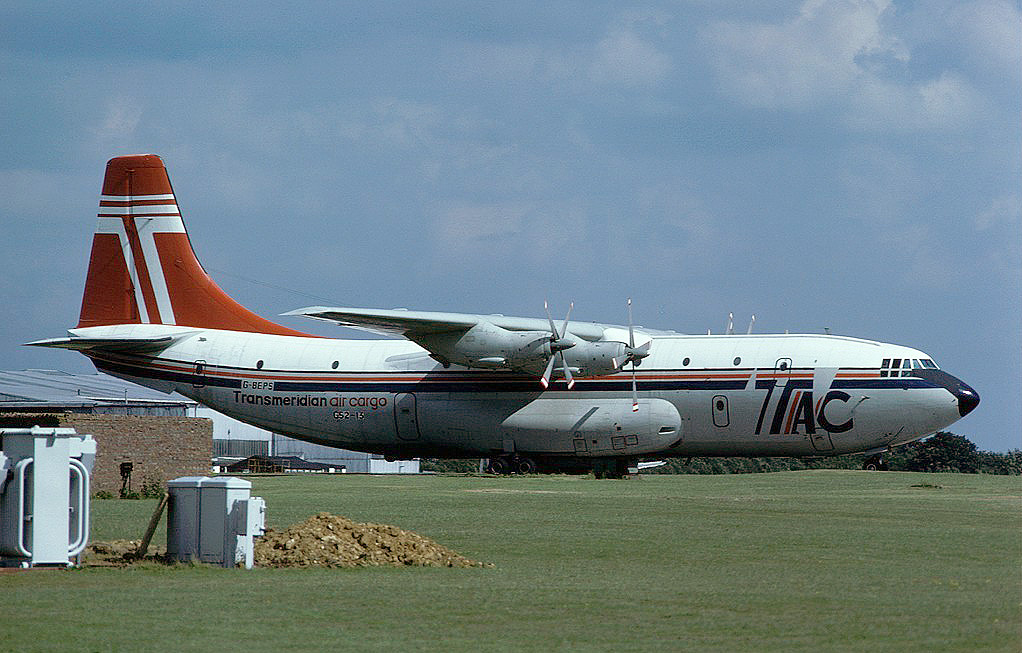
Short Belfast of Transmeridian Air Cargo at Stansted in 1979

On 20 January 1966, the Belfast C.1 entered service with No. 53 Squadron when XR367 (the sixth production aircraft) was delivered to RAF Brize Norton in Oxfordshire. Four months later, No. 53 Squadron was relocated to RAF Fairford, Gloucestershire, to make way for upgrades being performed at Brize Norton; they returned to RAF Brize Norton in 1967. Unusually for service aircraft, all the Belfasts were given names (Note: the aircraft were named after Samson, Spartacus, Theseus, Heracles, Goliath, Hector, Enceladus, Pallas, Atlas, Ajax) Following the type's entry into RAF service, it became apparent that a major drag problem was preventing the initial five aircraft from attaining Short's desired performance. Modifications and testing were subsequently carried out, particularly on aircraft SH1818 (which was at the time perfecting the RAF's requirement for CAT 3 automated landings at RAE Bedford), and a new rear fairing was developed, which had the result of raising the fleet's cruising speed by 40 mph.

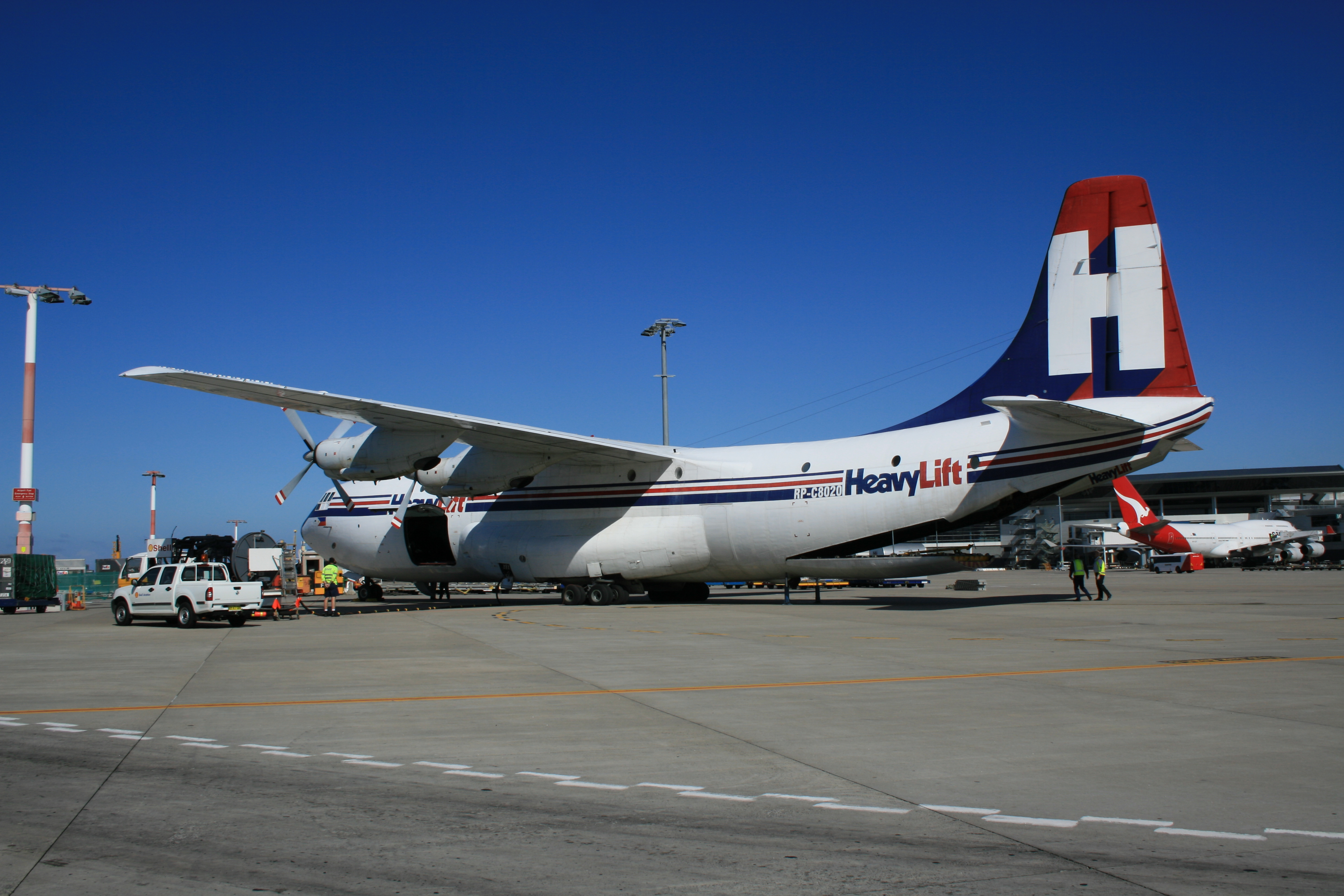
The Belfast is quite a large aircraft, as can be seen in this photo when it is compared to the vehicles and personnel near it.

The reorganisation of the new RAF Strike Command was to have repercussions on the RAF's Belfast fleet and ushered in the retirement of a number of aircraft types, including the Bristol Britannia and de Havilland Comet in 1975. By the end of 1976, the Belfast fleet had been retired and flown to RAF Kemble, Gloucestershire for long-term storage.

=== Civilian operations ===
TAC HeavyLift purchased five Belfasts for commercial use in 1977 and operated three of them from 1980 after being reworked to receive commercial certification. Ironically, some of them were later chartered during the Falklands War, with some sources suggesting that this cost more than keeping all the aircraft in RAF service until the 1990s. HeavyLift's Belfasts were again contracted to support the RAF during the first Gulf War, transporting vehicles and helicopters too large to be carried by the Hercules fleet.

After being retired from TAC HeavyLift service, several were parked at Southend Airport for a number of years.

One aircraft was refurbished and flown to Australia in 2003, operated by HeavyLift Cargo Airlines. This aircraft is no longer flying; it was often visible parked on the General Aviation side of Cairns International Airport in Queensland, in company with one or two of the company's Boeing 727s. Now registered RP-C8020, it was moved to the general aviation (western) side of the Cairns airport on 19 August 2011, after spending the best part of a year sitting on the Cairns International apron where it had been moved prior to the scrapping of the remaining company Boeing 727 (RP-C8016) at the end of September 2010. The HeavyLift titles were painted over on 28 August 2011, but the registration RP-C8020 was still visible. The aircraft was photographed intact, but with no registration visible, at Cairns Airport on 7 August 2017. Following registration with the FAA as N1819S, the Cairns Belfast was apparently undergoing restoration to flight and return to service. However, many aircraft at Cairns were flooded by Cyclone Jasper in December 2023.

A second Belfast, G-BEPS (SH1822), was to have joined her in Australia following refurbishment at Southend Airport, but was instead scrapped in October 2008. The last production Belfast (Enceladus, XR371) is preserved at the RAF Museum Midlands. This aircraft was repainted before being displayed under cover at the National Cold War Exhibition.

== Operators ==
=== Military operators ===
United Kingdom

- Royal Air Force
  - No. 53 Squadron RAF

=== Civil operators ===
Australia

- HeavyLift Cargo Airlines

United Kingdom

- TAC HeavyLift
- Transmeridian Air Cargo

== Specifications (Belfast C Mk.1) ==
Data from Jane's All The World's Aircraft 1969–70

General characteristics

- Crew: 5 (two pilots, engineer, navigator and loadmaster)
- Capacity: 150 troops (250 with removable upper floor installed) / 78,000 lb (35,380 kg) payload
- Length: 136 ft 5 in (41.58 m)
- Wingspan: 158 ft 9.5 in (48.400 m)
- Height: 47 ft 0 in (14.33 m)
- Wing area: 2,466 sq ft (229.1 m^{2})
- Aspect ratio: 10.22
- Airfoil: root: NACA 25017; tip: NACA 4413
- Empty weight: 127,000 lb (57,606 kg)
- Max takeoff weight: 230,000 lb (104,326 kg)
- Powerplant: 4 × Rolls-Royce R.Ty.12 Tyne Mk.101 turboprop engines, 5,730 shp (4,270 kW) each equivalent
- Propellers: 4-bladed Hawker Siddeley Dynamics 4/7000/6, 16 ft (4.9 m) diameter constant-speed fully feathering propellers

Performance

- Maximum speed: 352 mph (567 km/h, 306 kn)
- Cruise speed: 336 mph (541 km/h, 292 kn) at 24,000 ft (7,315 m)
- Stall speed: 112 mph (180 km/h, 97 kn)
- Range: 1,000 mi (1,610 km, 870 nmi) with maximum payload
- Ferry range: 6,100 mi (9,800 km, 5,300 nmi)
- Service ceiling: 30,000 ft (9,100 m)
- Rate of climb: 1,060 ft/min (5.4 m/s)

Avionics

- EKCO E190 weather radar

== See also ==
Aircraft of comparable role, configuration, and era

- Antonov An-22 – Soviet heavy military transport aircraft
- Douglas C-133 Cargomaster – US heavy lift four engine turboprop military aircraft, 1956
- Douglas C-124 Globemaster II – American heavy lift military aircraft with 4 piston engines, 1946
- Lockheed C-130 Hercules – American military transport aircraft
- Antonov An-12 – Soviet medium-range transport aircraft
- Shaanxi Y-8 – Chinese medium military transport aircraft

Related lists

- List of aircraft of the Royal Air Force
