= HeavyLift Cargo Airlines =

Australian cargo airline headquartered in Los Angeles, USA

IATA	ICAO	Call sign
HN	HVY	HEAVY CARGO
- Founded: 31 July 2002
- Commenced operations: 13 September 2002
- Ceased operations: March 21 2014
- Fleet size: 5
- Headquarters: Los Angeles, United States
- Key people: Nicholas Leach, Edin Corhodzic PNG

HeavyLift Cargo Airlines Pty Ltd was a cargo airline based in Los Angeles, United States. Founded in Sydney, Australia, it started operations in 2004 and operates scheduled and charter cargo services. HeavyLift took over passenger airline OzJet in 2008. HeavyLift sold Ozjet and its passenger aircraft to Air Australia in 2009. Heavylift transferred its business to the United States after the Australian Government banned operations of B727/737 stage III aircraft.

== Destinations ==
Heavylift operated worldwide charter cargo services.

== Fleet ==
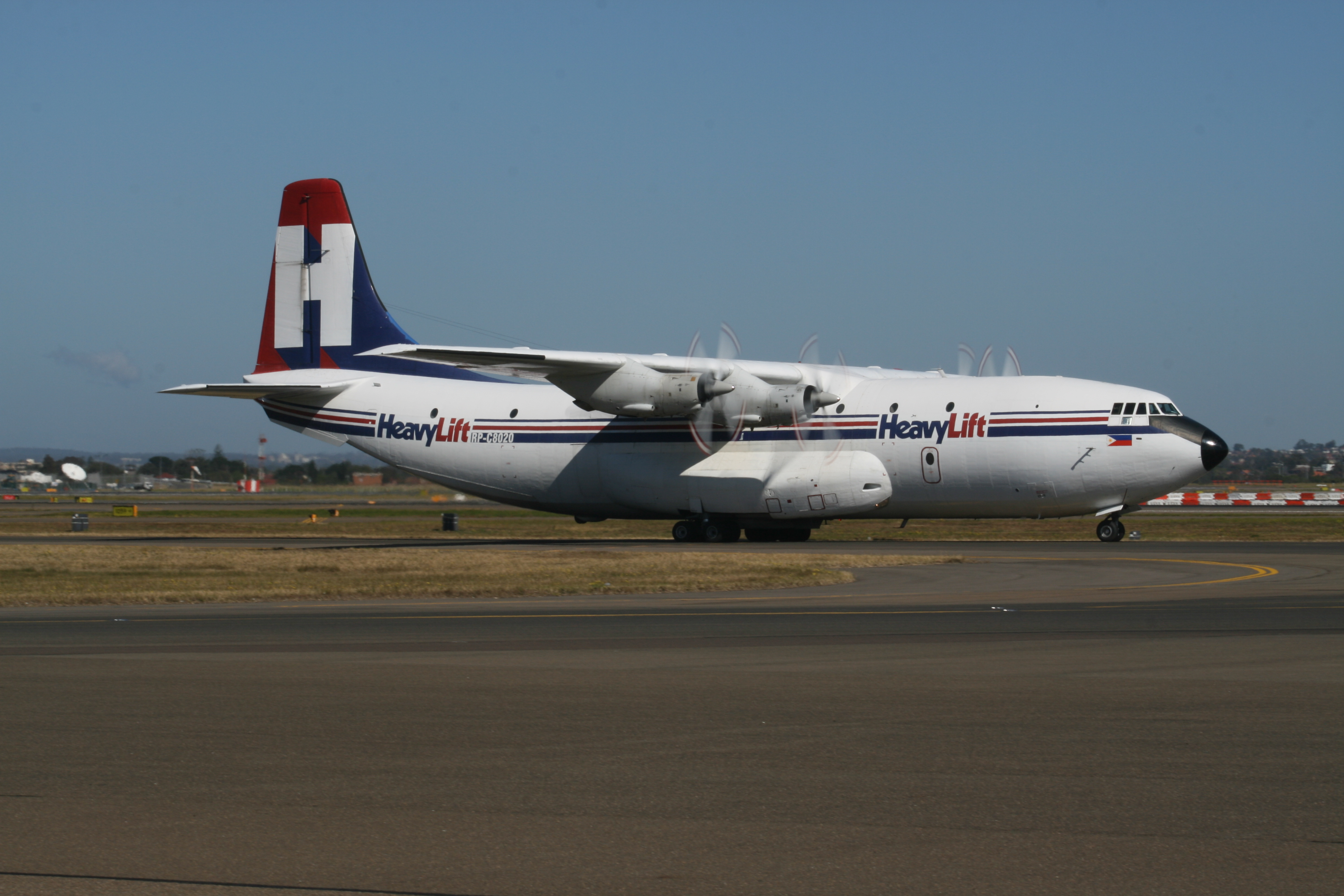
Heavylift's Belfast is registered in the Philippines as RP-C8020

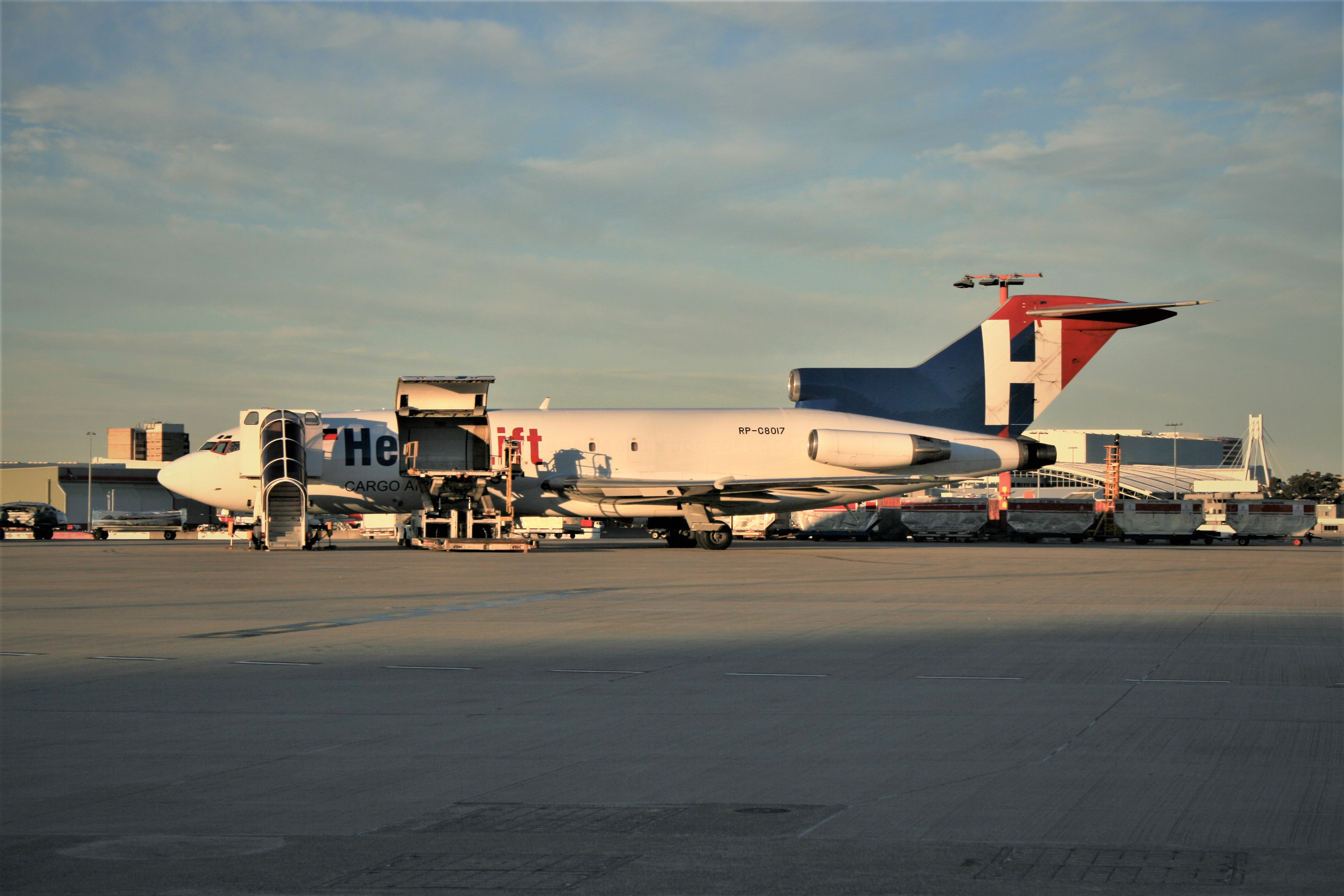
A Heavylift Boeing 727-100F waiting for cargo

As of November 2010 the Heavylift Cargo Airlines fleet consisted of:

- 1 Boeing 727-100F (Retired)
- 2 Boeing 727-200F (Retired)
- 1 Short Belfast (Retired)
- 4 Douglas DC-8-73F

The Belfast is now stored at Cairns Airport. During 2006, work was also underway at Bournemouth Airport to refurbish another aircraft once operated by HeavyLift's unrelated namesake UK airline, the unique Conroy CL-44-0; however it has been reported on various aviation internet message boards that this aircraft will not be delivered. A feature of the airline is that most of its aircraft are not registered in Australia, but in the Philippines.

In May 2008, Heavylift bought passenger airline OzJet giving it access to an Australia air operator's certificate. Ozjet discontinued passenger operations in May 2009.

== Prime Airlines ==
Prime Airlines was formed by HeavyLift Cargo Airlines as a passenger charter carrier. Initially offering its sole aircraft on an ad hoc basis from its base at East Midlands Airport (EMA) near Nottingham. Originally the airline was to be called Breeze but the company had difficulties in securing the name for operation. Finally the name Prime Airlines was chosen.

With the assistance of former Transaer managers HeavyLift Cargo Airlines leased its sole aircraft an A300B4-203 and recruitment began for cabin crew. As the airline only had one aircraft a total of 27 cabin crew were hired for the start of operations in mid-2001. The company had no need to recruit flight crew as HC Airlines operated the Airbus A300B4 in cargo configuration and simply cross utilized the crew. Once the airline obtained its AOC it began operations for a number of British inclusive tour operators and the military flying to destinations around Europe and the Middle East. After 9/11 the company suffered with lack of contracts and a second blow came when an American Airlines Airbus A300 (Flight 587) crashed in New York City. Like most airlines at this time Prime had to make redundancies and cut its cabin crew numbers in half.

== See also ==
- List of airlines of Australia
