= Strategic Airlines Luxembourg =

Charter airline from Luxembourg

| IATA | ICAO | Call sign |
|---|---|---|
| SH | STU | LUXLINER |
- Founded: July 2010
- Commenced operations: October 2010
- Ceased operations: October 2012
- Operating bases: Birmingham; London-Gatwick; Manchester
- Fleet size: 3
- Headquarters: Luxembourg

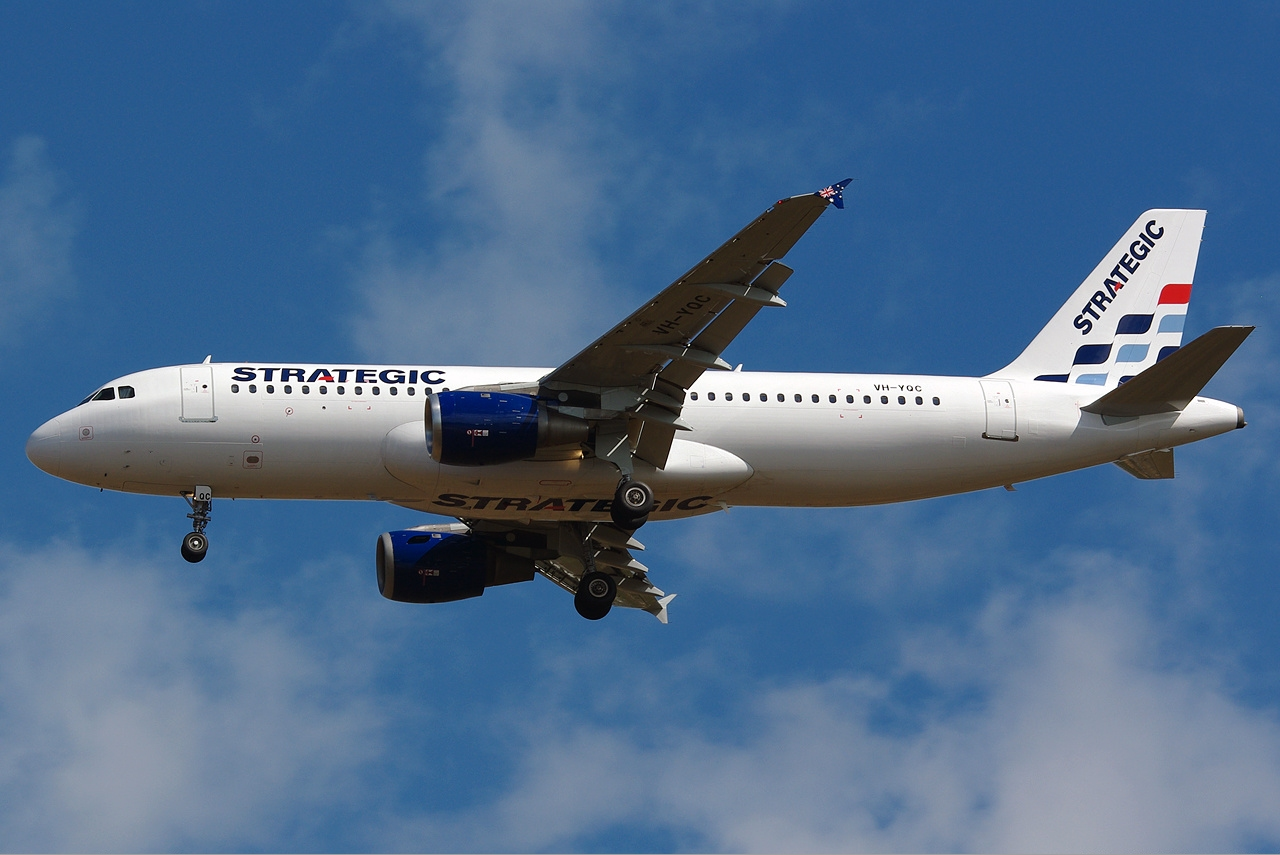
A320

Strategic Airlines SA, known as Strategic Airlines Luxembourg or Strategic Airlines, was a charter airline headquartered in Luxembourg that operated flights out of the United Kingdom. The airline had bases at Manchester, Birmingham and London-Gatwick offering holiday charter flights for mainly tour operators.

== History ==
The airline was created in July 2010 in Luxembourg as a subsidiary of the Australian airline Strategic Airlines, which later rebranded as Air Australia on 15 November 2011.

Strategic Airlines commenced services in October 2010 with one Airbus A320 aircraft from its bases at Manchester, Birmingham and London-Gatwick. The airline increased its fleet to three Airbus A320s in 2011.

On 17 February 2012, Air Australia, its parent company ceased operations. Strategic Airlines continued to operate as normal until Olympic Holidays, its only operating tour operator ended its contract on 3 October 2012. Strategic Airlines Luxembourg entered administration on 4 October 2012.

== Fleet ==
The Strategic Airlines Luxembourg fleet consists of the following aircraft with an average age of 19.3 years as of August 2012:

Strategic Airlines Luxembourg Fleet
| Aircraft | In Fleet | Passengers | Notes |
|---|---|---|---|
| Airbus A320-212 | 3 | 180 | |
| Total | 3 | | |

== Destinations ==
Flights operated from London Gatwick.

- Cyprus
  - Larnaca Airport
  - Paphos Airport
- Greece
  - Corfu – Ioannis Kapodistrias Airport
  - Heraklion International Airport
  - Rhodes International Airport
  - Skiathos Airport
  - Thessaloniki Airport
  - Zakynthos Airport

Flights operated from Manchester Airport (as of August 2012):

- Cyprus
  - Larnaca Airport
  - Paphos Airport
- Greece
  - Corfu – Ioannis Kapodistrias Airport
  - Heraklion International Airport
  - Kos International Airport
  - Rhodes International Airport
  - Skiathos Airport
  - Zakynthos Airport

Flights operate from Birmingham Airport

- Greece
  - Corfu – Ioannis Kapodistrias Airport
  - Heraklion International Airport
  - Zakynthos Airport
  - Rhodes - Diagoras Airport
