= Norfolk Island Airport =

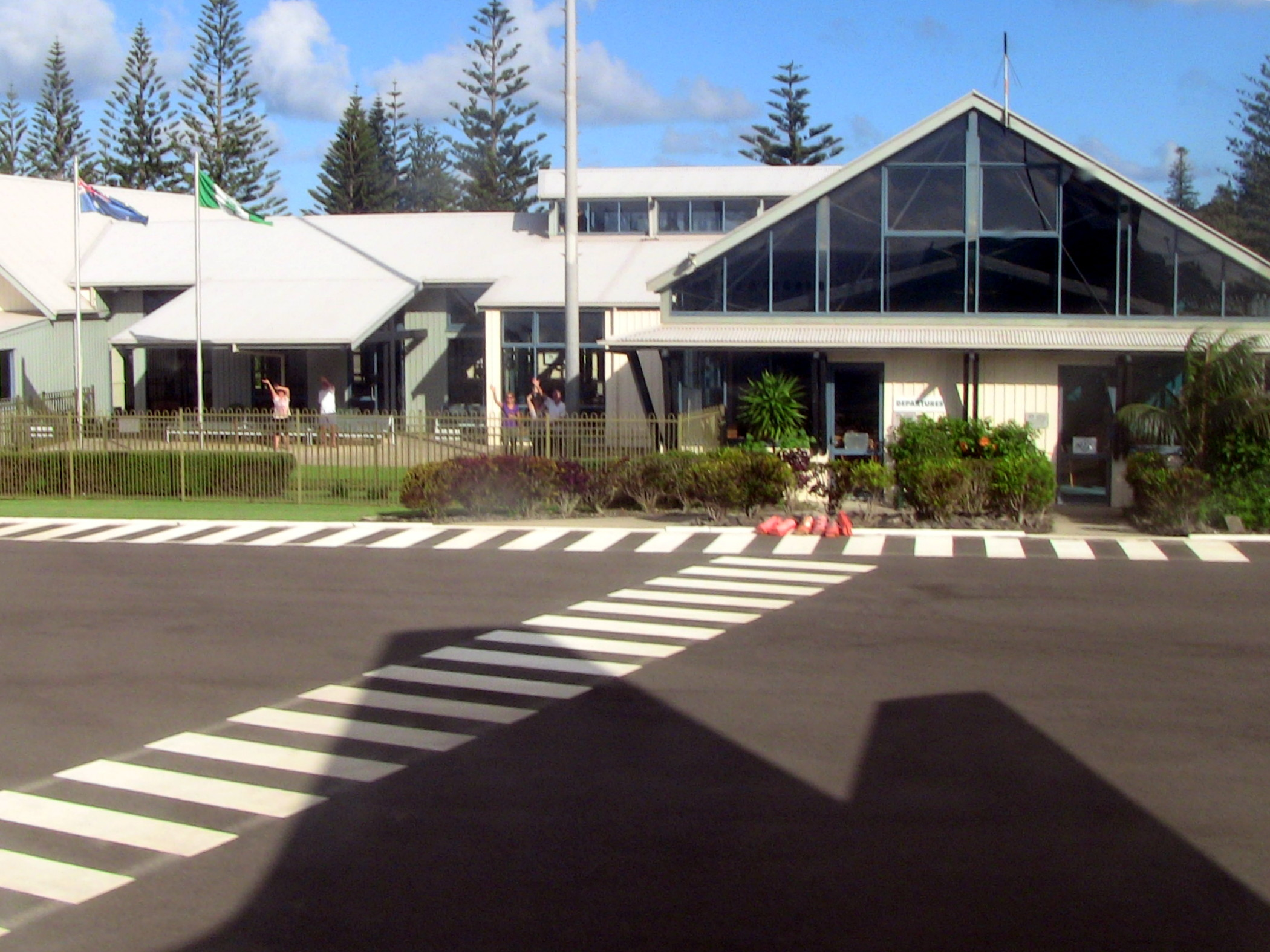
- IATA: NLK; ICAO: YSNF

Summary
- Airport type: Public
- Owner: Commonwealth of Australia
- Operator: Norfolk Island Regional Council
- Serves: Norfolk Island
- Elevation AMSL: 371 ft (113 m)
- Coordinates: 29°02′33″S 167°56′17″E
- Website: www.airport.gov.nf

Maps
- Location of airport on map of Oceania NLK (Oceania) NLK (Pacific Ocean)
- Interactive map of Norfolk Island Airport

Runways
Direction	Length		Surface
Direction	m	ft	Surface
11/29	1,950	6,398	Asphalt
04/22	1,435	4,708	Asphalt

Statistics (2010/11)
- Passengers: 57,758
- Aircraft movements: 872
- Sources: Australian AIP and aerodrome chart

Norfolk Island Airport (IATA: NLK, ICAO: YSNF) (Pitcairn-Norfolk: Norfuk Ailen Aeyaport), is the only airport on Norfolk Island. It is operated by the Norfolk Island Regional Council, and is on the west side of the island.

== History ==
In August 1942, the United States Army Air Forces requested that the Government of Australia construct an aerodrome on Norfolk Island for use by its heavy bombers. It was built by the Civil Constructional Corps, comprising volunteers from Government of New South Wales departments. The corps was assisted by island residents, with about 300 men employed in total. The first runway was completed in late 1942, with a Royal New Zealand Air Force (RNZAF) plane landing on Christmas Day. The second runway was opened in February 1943, and the workers left the following month.

The construction of the runways necessitated the destruction of Pine Avenue, a local landmark consisting of about 500 Norfolk Island pines reaching up to 170 feet (52 m) in height. As Norfolk Island did not have enough flat ground, in 1942 several bulldozers were used to knock the tops off several hills, and fill in the valleys between them. Steel mesh was then used to make a solid surface.

The airfield was never used as an operational base, but was available to the Allies for use as a staging depot, a refuge for aircraft in distress, and a possible base for anti-submarine patrols. A RNZAF Radar Unit operated on the island as a navigational aid, and it became a stopover for aircraft travelling between Australia, New Caledonia, New Zealand and the Solomon Islands. The RNZAF left the airfield in July 1946. At the airfield was an air-sea rescue unit, a servicing section and a radar unit installation at Mount Bates.

In 1981, the airport was expanded to allow Fokker F28s to use the airport.

== Light aircraft transit ==
Norfolk Island is an important transit and refueling point for light aircraft flying between Australia, New Zealand, and the Pacific Islands.

Located 852 km (529 mi) southeast of Norfolk is Kaitaia Airport the most northerly airfield in New Zealand, 754 km (469 mi) north is Nouméa Airport in New Caledonia, and 900 km (560 mi) west is Lord Howe Island Airport which is 600 km (370 mi) to the Australian mainland.

These distances are within the range of many light aircraft when fitted with long range tanks, while the direct distance without using Norfolk Island as a stepping stone is usually beyond their capabilities.

From New Caledonia other Pacific Islands such as Vanuatu and Fiji are within range and can be used as further stepping stones to the other South Pacific and North Pacific destinations.

== Facilities ==
The airport is at an elevation of 371 ft (113 m) above sea level. It has two asphalt paved runways: 11/29 measuring 1,950 m × 45 m (6,398 ft × 148 ft) and 04/22 measuring 1,435 m × 30 m (4,708 ft × 98 ft). The airport is staffed by a single air traffic controller.

The airport has a small passenger terminal building which includes waiting areas as well as processing areas for check in, security, emigration control, customs control (Norfolk Customs), baggage reclaim and immigration control (Norfolk Immigration Office). A small cafe (Airport Cafe) is open prior to departing flights.

A small cargo terminal building is located next to passenger terminal. Power is provided by the onsite Norfolk Airport Diesel Power Station. A small carpark is located at the front entrance of the terminal.

The airport can handle small general aviation aircraft up to a jetliner such as the narrow-body Airbus A320.

== Rescue and fire services ==
Aviation Rescue and Fire Fighting Service of the Norfolk Island Fire Service provides firefighting service for the airport.

The airport fire and rescue has two airport fire tenders. Two new Rosenbauer Panther ARFF replaced two 1960s era Thornycroft Nubian Mk 1 6x6 airport tenders in 2009. A new fire station is being built to replace the current building to house the new fire engines.

== Airlines and destinations ==
=== Passenger ===
Airlines	Destinations
Qantas	Brisbane, Sydney

If passengers would fly internationally from this airport, they would need to transit in either Brisbane or Sydney to get to other international destinations.

=== Notes ===
Air New Zealand's services to Norfolk Island normally consisted of two flights per week from Brisbane and three flights per week from Sydney using Airbus A320 aircraft. However, due to Air New Zealand staffing issues related to COVID-19 border closures in 2021, Qantas temporarily took over both routes from the Australian mainland to Norfolk Island from 19 March 2021. This was initially to be until 30 August 2021. But Qantas' contract to service Norfolk Island was later extended until 30 June 2022 after Air New Zealand was unable to establish a planned crew base in Brisbane that would have enabled the airline to continue serving the island despite New Zealand and Australia's borders being closed to each other.

Air New Zealand previously also flew from Auckland to Norfolk Island. On 16 December 2016, Air New Zealand announced it was ceasing its flight services between Norfolk Island and Auckland citing low passenger numbers. The last flight was on 21 May 2017.

Air Chathams started flying from Auckland to Norfolk Island on 6 September 2016 using the 50 seat Convair 580 once per week. Air Chathams suspended the route in March 2020 due to COVID-19 pandemic restrictions but resumed flights on 27 May 2021, once restrictions had eased using an ATR 72-500 aircraft. In January 2025, Air Chathams announced they were ending services to Norfolk Island in April 2025 due to high operating costs and the loss of subsidiaries from Norfolk Island Regional Council.

Norfolk Island Airlines previously operated services for a short time with Nauru Airlines Boeing 737-300s.

Norfolk Jet Express operated from the airport from 1997 to 2005 and Norfolk Air from 2006 to 2012. In 1996, Ansett Australia was operating nonstop Boeing 737-300 jet service between the airport and Sydney four days a week.

== Transportation ==
The airport is connected to the rest of the island by Douglas Drive.

Transportation to and from the airport can be made by taxi, private car hires or local hotel shuttles.

== Statistics ==
Norfolk Island Airport was ranked 56th in Australia for the number of revenue passengers served in financial year 2010–2011.

Annual passenger and aircraft statistics for Norfolk Island
Year	Revenue passengers	Aircraft movements
2001–02	59,562	744
2002–03	72,781	1,091
2003–04	81,470	1,199
2004–05	72,801	939
2005–06	62,483	691
2006–07	73,163	913
2007–08	75,925	1,027
2008–09	64,782	951
2009–10	61,594	863
2010–11	57,758	872
