= Air Australia =

Airline of Australia (1991–2012)

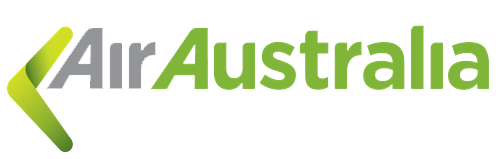

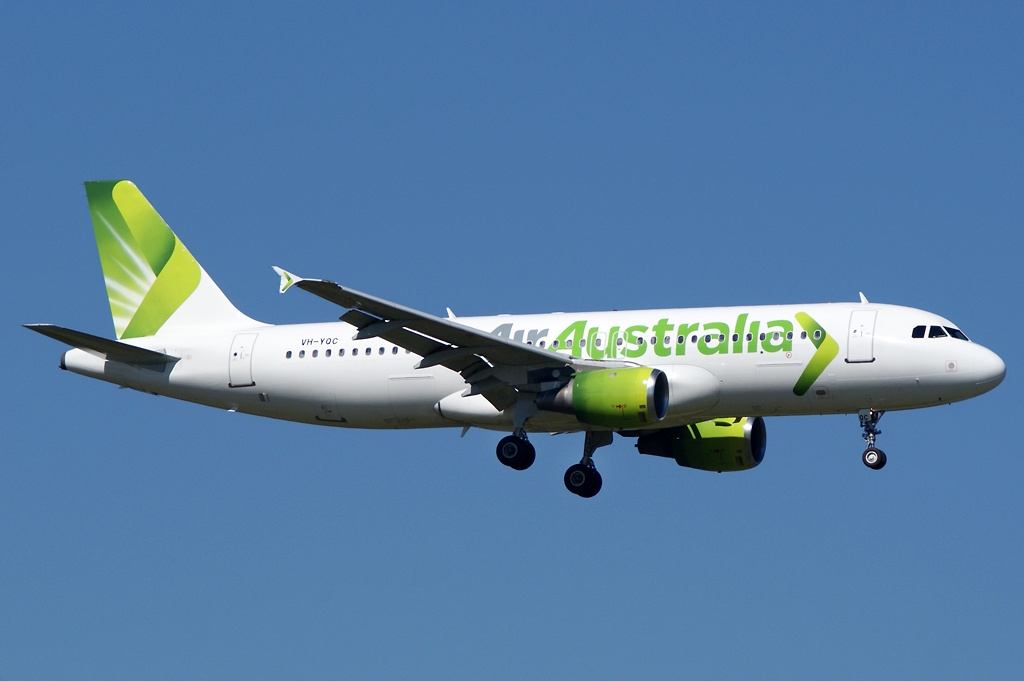
- A former Air Australia Airbus A320 landing at Melbourne Airport
IATA	ICAO	Call sign
VC	AGC	STRATEGIC
- Founded: 1991
- Ceased operations: 23 March 2012
- Operating bases: Brisbane; Melbourne
- Subsidiaries: Strategic Airlines Luxembourg; OzJet; Strategic Engineering Australia; Strategic Aviation
- Fleet size: 4
- Destinations: 5
- Headquarters: Hendra, Queensland, Australia
- Website: www.airaustralia.com

Air Australia was an Australian airline flying domestic and international scheduled passenger flights. Strategic Aviation, a sister company, flew air charter flights using the Air Australia fleet or other leased aircraft.

Air Australia halted all flights and was placed into voluntary administration on 17 February 2012, and into liquidation on 23 March 2012.

== History ==
Founded in 1991 as an air freight broker and trading as Air Charter Logistics, Strategic Aviation Pty Ltd was founded by Shaun Aisen. The company specialised in the transportation of oversize or unique cargo, chartering flights on Antonov An-124s, Ilyushin IL-76s and Boeing 747 freighters. In 2002, Michael James joined the company as an executive director and equal shareholder. With a background at Ansett and air charter, James assisted the company to successfully bid for an Australian Defence Force Troop Lift Contract. With this diversification, the trading name was dropped and the company rebranded as Strategic.

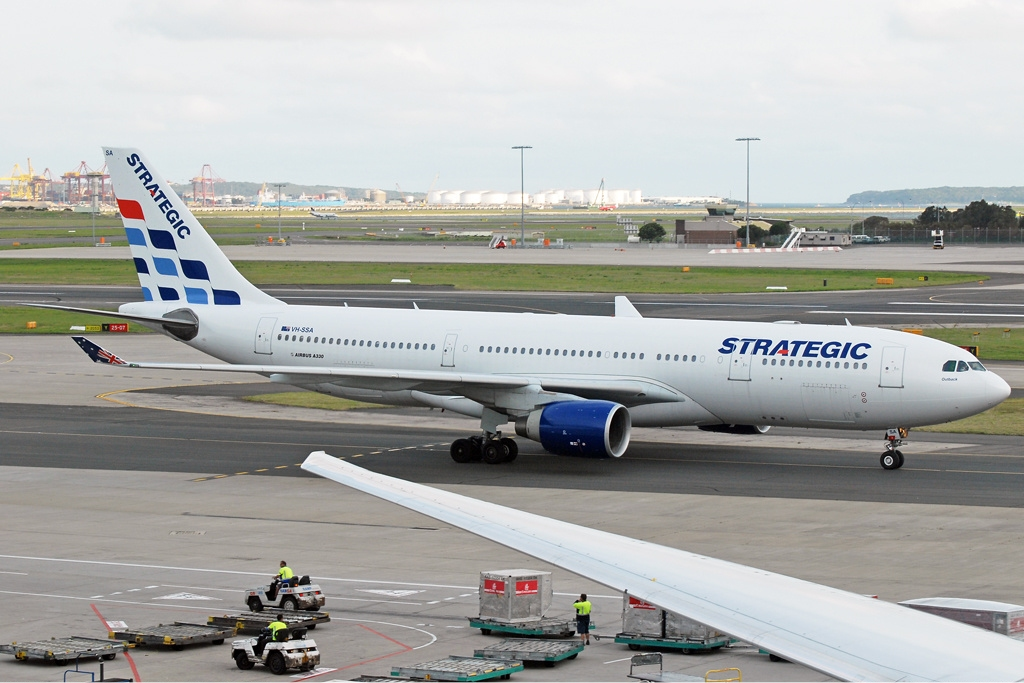
Strategic's Airbus A330-200 at Sydney Airport (2010)

This contract was initially serviced with a leased Airbus A330-200 from Portuguese Airline HiFly utilising Australian crews. Former OzJet operations director David Blake was appointed CEO in 2008 to assist with the expansion of the airline side of the business.

The first Australian-registered aircraft, an Airbus A330, was delivered in July 2009, and the Australian Air Operators Certificate was awarded soon after in September. This was complemented by a third A320 in December 2009.

In June 2009 Strategic purchased the troubled airline OzJet along with its staff, its Air Operators Certificate and the Perth–Derby RPT route. The route was serviced by a chartered Fokker 100 from Alliance Airlines until Strategic's first Australian-registered Airbus A320 was introduced in early 2010.

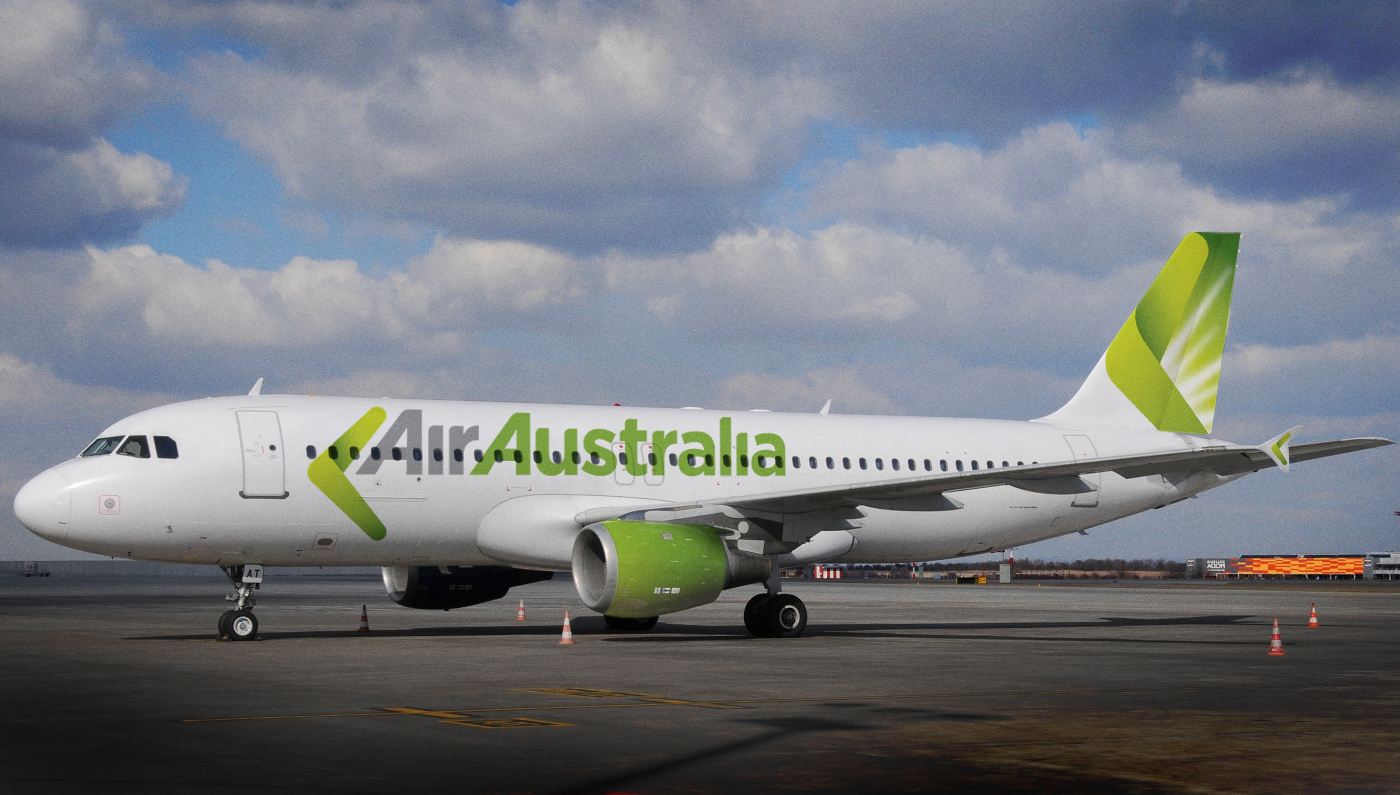
Air Australia's first repainted Airbus A320-200 in 2011

In February 2011 Executive Director, Shaun Aisen severed his ties with the company leaving Michael James the sole owner. Six months following Aisen's departure from the company six other members of staff left the company as well, namely the chief executive, the chief operating officer and the commercial manager. The main reason for the sudden exodus was opposing views on how the company was heading under the leadership of James. A former senior-staff member stated, "when there were two owners, they were almost opposite poles, which worked to the advantage of the business." Aisen's conservative approach was perceived to have balanced out James's different approach to the running of the company.

In the Sydney Morning Herald on 2 April 2011, it was first claimed that the airline would change its name by the end of the year, in order to create a brand more identifiable with its Australian roots. The name change was confirmed in August 2011, with the airline also planning on becoming a low-cost carrier and announcing service from Brisbane and Melbourne to Honolulu to begin in December 2011.

== Administration ==
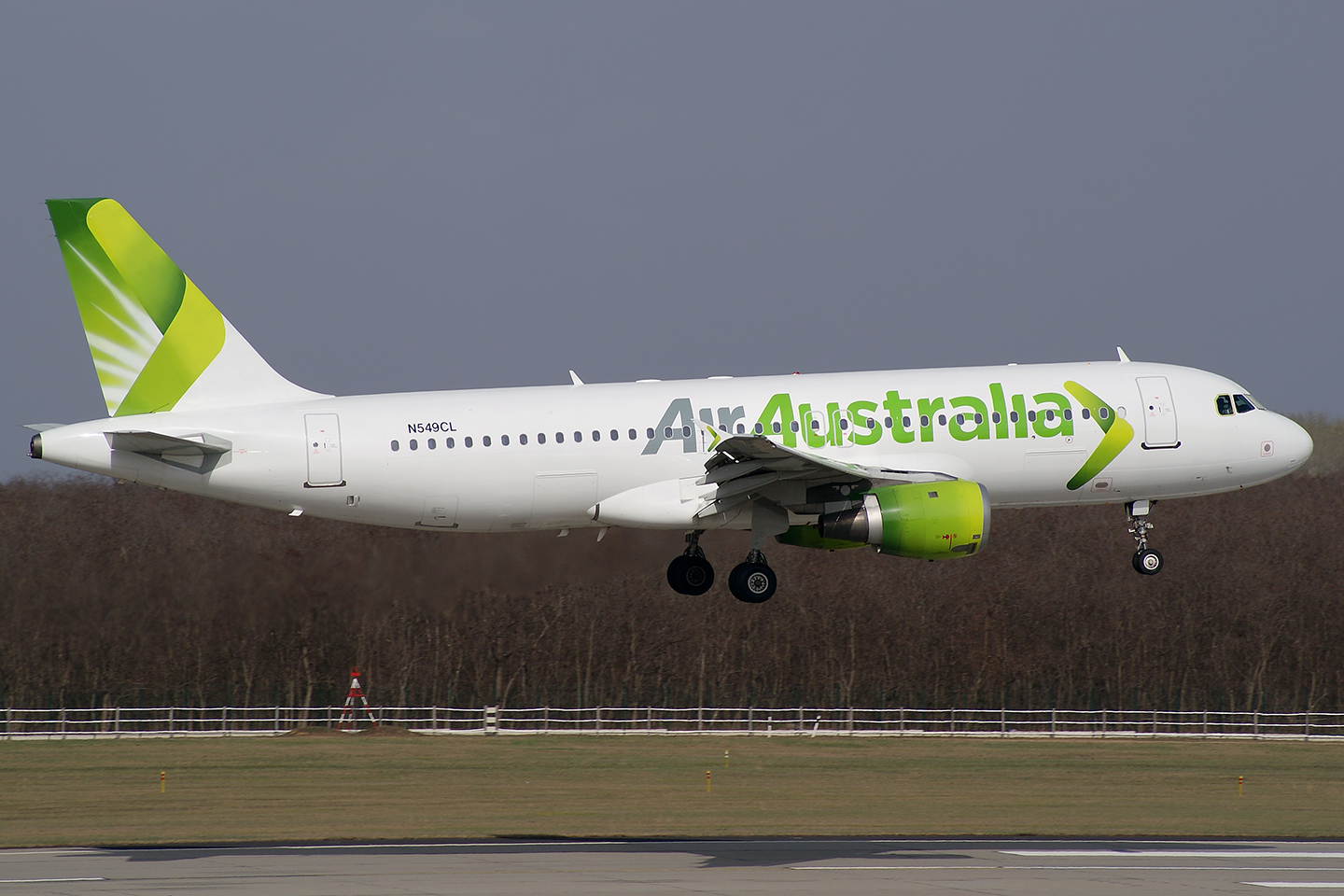
Former Air Australia Airbus A320 arriving at Budapest (2012)

On 17 February 2012 at Strategic Group's directors decided that the Strategic group of companies including Air Australia, Strategic Engineering Australia, and Strategic Aviation, would be placed into voluntary administration. This was brought about because the fuel supplier refused to refuel an aircraft in Phuket, Thailand on 16 February 2012 due to mounting outstanding payments. The airlines' directors appointed KordaMentha as administrators.

Air Australia suspended all flights leaving approximately 4,000 passengers stranded in Denpasar (Indonesia), Phuket (Thailand) and Hawaii (USA), as well as domestically in Australia. These passengers were advised that they would have to make their own travel arrangements at their own expense.

KordaMentha found the airline owed creditors up to $90 million but had only $1 million in assets as much of its equipment was leased. Administrator Mark Korda said the airline was not saleable and was likely to go into liquidation. The collapse put 300 employees out of work.

On 24 March 2012, the creditors voted to place Air Australia into liquidation.

== Services and destinations ==
The Strategic Aviation group held licences for air charter and air freight brokerage services under the Strategic Aviation banner, which also utilised aircraft from Air Australia and other wet leased aircraft when required.

Air Australia operated scheduled services to:

Country	City	Airport	Notes	Ref
Australia	Brisbane	Brisbane Airport	Base	
Australia	Derby	RAAF Curtin		
Australia	Melbourne	Melbourne Airport	Base	
Australia	Perth	Perth Airport		
Australia	Port Hedland	Port Hedland Airport		
Australia	Gladstone	Gladstone Airport		
Indonesia	Bali	Ngurah Rai International Airport		
Thailand	Phuket	Phuket International Airport		
United States	Honolulu	Daniel K. Inouye International Airport		

In June 2011 Strategic Airlines applied for rights to fly to the United States with services to commence in September 2011. Strategic announced a 2 per week Brisbane to Honolulu and a 2 per week Melbourne to Honolulu service, to begin on 14 December 2011.

Additionally, in May 2011, Strategic Airlines lodged an application with the Australia-based International Air Services Commission for 1,911 seats weekly on the Australia to China route (no specific routes were mentioned). In its application, the Airline requested the capacity be made available from September 2011 onwards. On 6 June 2011, the International Air Services Commission granted Strategic Airlines 1,911 seats each week on the Australia to China route and media reports suggested that the airline was planning on 3 times weekly services from Brisbane to Beijing or Shanghai.

Air Australia had applied to operate four services per week to Vietnam to begin in March 2012 from the IASC.

== Fleet ==
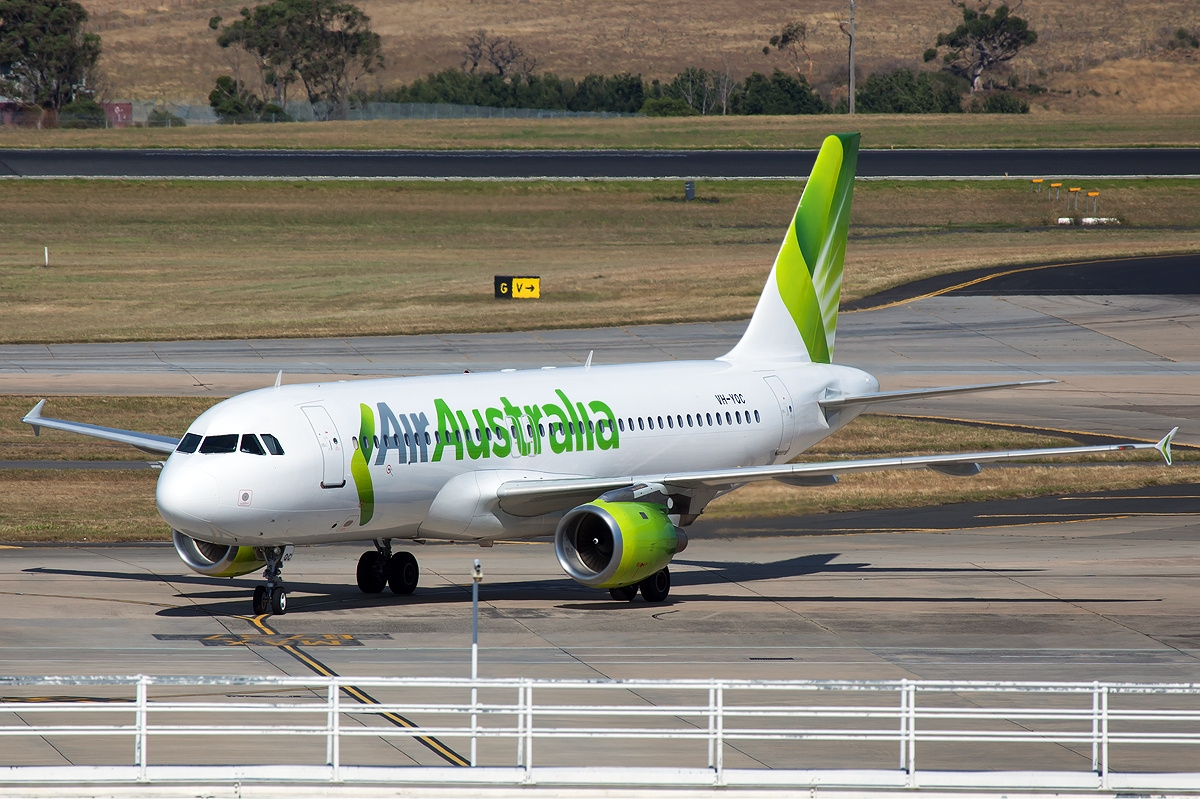
Air Australia Airbus A320 at Melbourne Airport

As of May 2010, the fleet consisted of:

Aircraft	In fleet	On order	Seats			Notes
Aircraft	In fleet	On order	J	Y	Total	Notes
Airbus A320-200	3	8	8	144	152	
Airbus A330-200	1	6	30	243	273	

Strategic's orders for Airbus A330-200s consisted of six for expansion in new markets of China and India from both its Melbourne and Brisbane bases. and two for Australian market set for delivery in late 2011 and early 2012.

== Controversies ==
In 2010, it was reported that two Australian Defence officers working in the unit responsible for a $30-million-a-year contract to fly Australian troops to the Middle East were providing information during the tender process to Strategic Airlines, which was later declared the winner. The two members, Captain David Charlton and Warrant Officer Class Two John Davies, then working for the ADF's No 1 Joint Movement Group, were reported to have passed information to company executives about "... key tender dates and Defence's preferred aircraft for the Middle East flights". Defence Department investigations found no case to answer for the two Defence officers involved and declared all parties had complied with fair and transparent tender and evaluation processes. Both officers were subsequently employed in senior management positions in Strategic.
