= Norfolk Island National Park =

National park in Norfolk Island, Australia

- IUCN category II (national park)
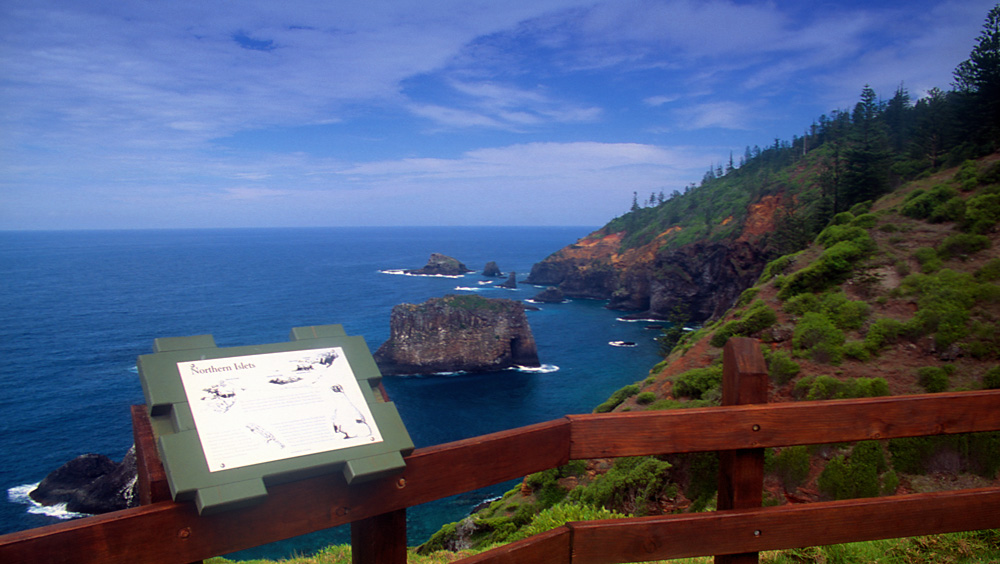
- Captain Cook lookout within the Norfolk Island National Park

- Location within Norfolk Island
- Location: Norfolk Island
- Nearest city: Burnt Pine
- Coordinates: 29°04′S 167°56′E
- Area: 6.5 km^{2} (2.5 sq mi)
- Established: 1984
- Governing body: Director of National Parks
- Website: Official website

Norfolk Island National Park is a protected area of 6.50 km^{2} (2.51 sq mi) located at 29°2′0″S 167°56′59″E in the South Pacific Ocean, about 1,471 kilometres (914 miles) off the East coast of Australia. The park’s area includes the Mount Pitt section on the namesake Norfolk Island with an area of 4.60 km^{2} (1.78 sq mi) / 460 ha (1,100 acres), as well as the neighbouring Phillip Island encompassing 1.90 km^{2} (0.73 sq mi) / 190 ha (470 acres), and the much smaller Nepean Island. The Norfolk Island group is a Commonwealth of Australia external territory, and is the only place in the world where the Norfolk Island parakeet and the white-chested white-eye occur.

Norfolk Island National Park, established in 1984 and managed by the Director of National Parks, Commonwealth of Australia, is one of many national parks in Oceania, and serves as a nature sanctuary for several severely endangered species, as well as a vacation spot for outdoor enthusiasts. It is maintained by staff on-hand and funded by the Australian government.

== History ==
Norfolk Island National Park was established in 1984 and is managed by the Commonwealth of Australia. Mount Pitt and the Botanical Gardens were both established as part of Norfolk Island National Park in 1984. They were declared a National Park under the National Park and Wildlife Conservation Act of 1975. Before the national park was established, the territory was considered a public reserve under the Commons and Public Reserves Ordinance of 1936. Due to steep terrain and rocky cliffs, much of the land has remained unfarmable, leaving most of the island untouched. During World War II, a radar station was placed on top of Mount Bates, and can still be visited today.

== Flora ==
Norfolk Island National Park is home to 182 native plant species and serves as a refuge for 40 endemic plant species, 15 of which are listed as threatened (critically endangered) species under Part 13 of the EPBC Act. For example, Clematis dubia, a “woody climber with white and hairy flowers” is a critically endangered plant, and the Norfolk Island National Park is vital to its survival. There were only 15 known plants of this species left in 2003. Threats to this plant and plants like it include habitat destruction, fire, invasive species, extreme weather, and a decrease in population of the animals that pollinate them. Also significant is the white oak (Lagunaria patersonia), an important food source for native animals like the Norfolk parakeet and the Lord Howe Island gecko. Other notable trees include the Norfolk Island pine (Araucaria heterophylla), an endemic species that is important to island ecosystems and culture.

== Fauna ==
=== Generally ===
There are two native reptiles, the Lord Howe Island gecko and the Lord Howe Island skink, both of which occur only on Phillip Island. The two native mammals, Gould’s wattled bat (Chalinolobus gouldii) and the east-coast free-tailed bat (Mormopterus norfolkensis), are both thought to have been extirpated. The reason that many of the native animals are endangered or extinct is largely because of feral animals, such as the black rat (Rattus rattus) and the feral fowl (Gallus gallus).

=== Birds ===
Norfolk Island is home to the endangered Norfolk parakeet, which is on the brink of extinction under threat from feral cats and rats. These birds only live on Norfolk Island, but park rangers and environmentalists are working together along with citizens to raise money and help grow the population and move some of these birds to the safer nearby Phillip Island, which lacks natural predators, and is the location of an insurance colony that has been launched. The parrots are brought to the island as chicks so that they do not try and fly back to the main island, and are kept in an aviary and hand fed until they can be released back into the wild. The green parrot conservation effort was funded through the island’s first use of a crowdfunding system, which had a target of A$77,000 and raised almost A$90,000, and also funded building homes for the rare Norfolk boobook owl. The excess money went towards replanting plants the green parrots use as food, and towards predator eradication on the island.

Only 7 of the 15 species of birds endemic to the island still remain.

== Geography ==
=== Climate ===
Norfolk Island National Park, like the rest of the island, has a temperate climate. Its average January high temperature is 22 °C (71 °F). The average July high temperature is 17 °C (62 °F). June is the rainiest month, receiving 98 mm (3.9 in) of precipitation, while February has the least, with just 37 mm (1.5 in) of precipitation. The temperature is quite moderate even in the summer, with an average of only 0.9 days with a high above 25 °C (77 °F).

== Recreation ==
Norfolk Island National Park attracts tourists and provides activities for nature enthusiasts. The National Park’s Botanical Garden hosts several rare species of plants and birds, as well as many other types of wildlife. The island is the indigenous home of Cyathea brownii, the tallest tree ferns on earth. Birdwatching is popular, and there are many hiking trails through the park and around the island as well as a golf course. Fishing is also a popular activity, though freshwater fishing is scarce because of a lack of indigenous fresh fish on the park’s grounds. In fact, only two native fresh fish have ever been recorded on the Island: the speckled longfin eel (Anguilla Reinhardtii) and the short-finned eel (Anguilla australis). Fresh fish have been introduced to the freshwater streams and lakes on the island over time by park management. The park also offers many areas for barbecues and picnics, as well as the Captain Cook monument and lookout platform commemorating Captain James Cook, who once stated that the island was a “paradise”. The park is also the home to Mount Pitt and Mount Bates, the two highest points on Norfolk Island.

== See also ==
- Protected areas managed by the Australian government
