= Clematis dubia =

Conservation status
- Critically endangered (EPBC Act)

Scientific classification
- Kingdom: Plantae
- Clade: Embryophytes
- Clade: Tracheophytes
- Clade: Spermatophytes
- Clade: Angiosperms
- Clade: Eudicots
- Order: Ranunculales
- Family: Ranunculaceae
- Genus: Clematis
- Species: C. dubia

Binomial name
- Clematis dubia (Endl.) P.S.Green

Synonyms
- Ripogonum dubium Endl. 1833; Clematis aristata subsp. cocculifolia (A.Cunn.) Kuntze; Clematis aristata var. leichhardtiana Kuntze; Clematis cocculifolia A.Cunn.

Species of flowering plant in the buttercup family

Clematis dubia, also known as the Mount Pitt Clematis, is a woody vine that is endemic to the Australian external territory of Norfolk Island in the south-west Pacific Ocean. It was originally described in 1833 by Austrian botanist Stephan Endlicher.

== Description ==
The species is a vigorous climber with hairy, white flowers.

== Distribution and habitat ==
Plants are found within the Norfolk Island National Park in the Mount Pitt and Mount Bates area, growing on trees where there are light gaps, such as on forest margins and in clearings. It was formerly more common; its conservation status has been assessed as Critically Endangered, and it is threatened by competition with invasive weeds.
