= C. alexanderi =

C. alexanderi may refer to:

- Catopsalis alexanderi, an extinct mammal species
- Christinus alexanderi, a gekko species found in the Nullarbor Plain of Australia

== See also ==
- Alexanderi
