= Nepean Island (Norfolk Island) =

Island near Norfolk Island

Native name: Nepeyan Ailen
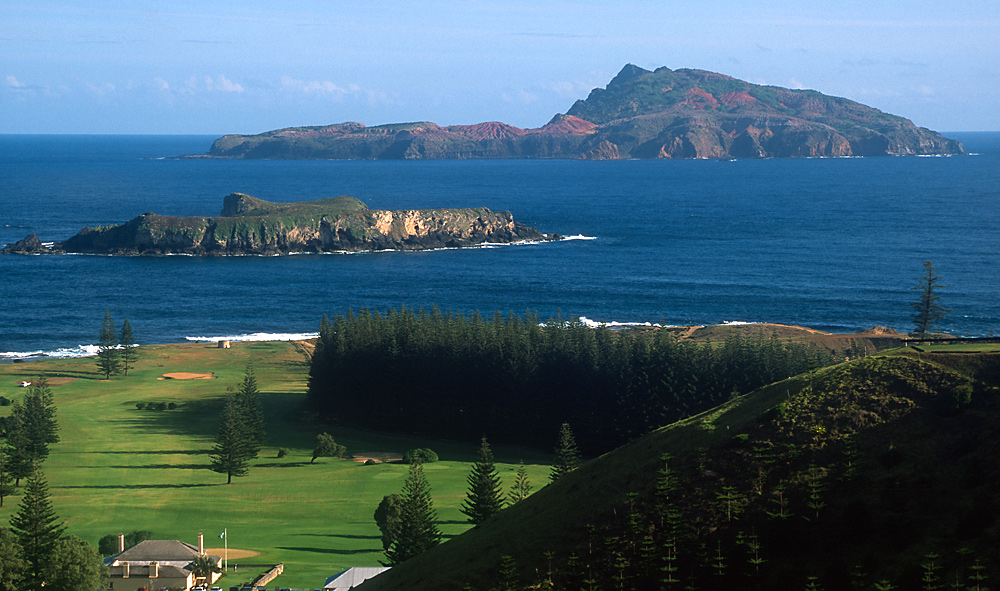
- View across to Nepean Island (foreground) and Phillip Island in the distance

Geography
- Location: Pacific Ocean
- Coordinates: 29°4′16″S 167°57′50″E
- Area: 10 ha (25 acres)

Administration
- Australia

Demographics
- Population: 0

Additional information
- Time zone: NFT (Norfolk Island Time) (UTC+11:00)
- Nepean Island is located about 800 metres (870 yards) south of Norfolk Island.

Nepean Island (Norfuk: Nepeyan Ailen) is a small uninhabited island located about 800 metres (870 yards) south of Norfolk Island in the Southwest Pacific. The island is about 10 hectares (25 acres) in area. Nepean Island is uninhabited due to its small size and tall cliffs flanking it, making landfall nearly impossible for small boats. It is part of the Commonwealth of Australia's external territory of Norfolk Island, and is included in the Norfolk Island National Park as is nearby Phillip Island and about 10 percent of Norfolk Island proper.

== History ==
Unlike Norfolk and Phillip Islands, Nepean is not volcanic in origin, but is Late Pleistocene limestone formed from wind blown sand dunes between the last two ice ages. Calcareous sand grains were bound by carbonate cement to form a calcarenite limestone.

Although Polynesian people were known to have settled around Kingston, no evidence of Polynesian settlement has been found on Nepean Island. The island was first cleared during the First Settlement. Nepean was used as a quarry and for timber during the Second Convict Settlement of Norfolk Island, and was abandoned as a site during that settlement. Remaining stone steps can be seen on the east coast.

It is thought the island was named in 1788 by Lieutenant Philip Gidley King for Evan Nepean, Under-Secretary of State for the Home Department, who was involved with arrangements for the dispatch of the First Fleet and with administration of the colony of New South Wales during its early years.

== Flora and fauna ==
The island is made of calcareous rock dating from the late Pleistocene and is a breeding site for several species of seabirds. Before being cleared in the 1790s, the island was home to about 200 Norfolk Island pines. Today, native plants present on the island include pigface, native spinach, moo-oo, native flax and native rush. The masked booby breeds onsite during the summer. From July to December little shearwaters breed on the island. Other birds such as the whale bird, grey noddy, black noddy, wedge-tailed shearwater, brown noddy and red-tailed tropicbird also breed on Nepean Island. It is a refuge for the endemic marbled gecko, which is now extinct on Norfolk Island. It is also home to the Phillip Island skink. The island is home to little nipper landcrabs and freshwater crabs. Green turtles are often seen off the coast of the island.

== See also ==
- List of islands of Australia
- Outline of Norfolk Island
