= Phillip Island (Norfolk Island) =

Island near Norfolk Island

Coordinates: 29°07′S 167°57′E

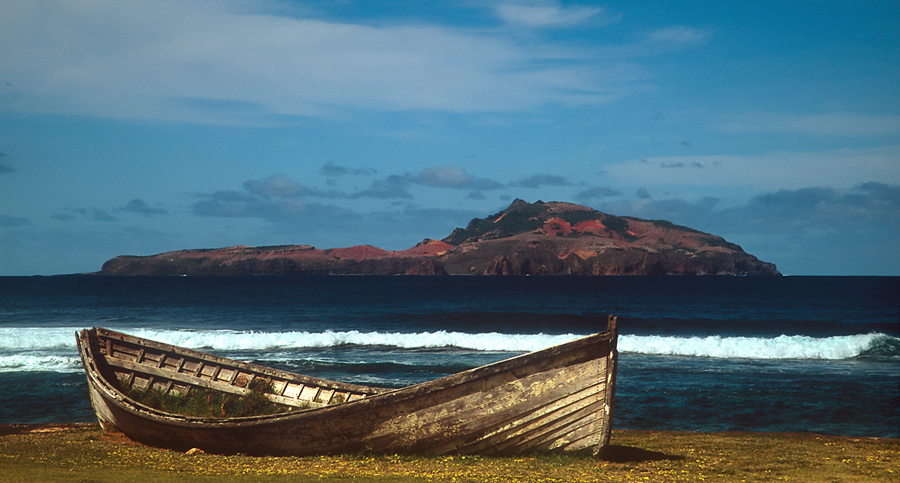
Phillip Island

Phillip Island is an island located 6 km (3.7 mi) south of Norfolk Island in the Southwest Pacific, and is part of the Norfolk Island group. It was named in 1788 by Lieutenant Philip Gidley King after Arthur Phillip, the first Governor of New South Wales. Phillip Island is part of the Australian external territory of Norfolk Island, and is included in Norfolk Island National Park, as is neighbouring Nepean Island and about 10 percent of Norfolk Island proper.

A National Parks hut located near the centre of the island houses a small rotating group of around four people for much of the year. Otherwise the island is uninhabited.

Phillip Island is located about 6 kilometres (3.7 miles) south of Norfolk Island.

Phillip Island has an area of 190 hectares (470 acres), measuring 2.1 km (1.3 mi) from west to east and 1.95 km (1.21 mi) from north to south, with the highest point, Jacky Jacky, being 280 m (920 ft) above sea level. It is roughly shaped like a hairdryer with the nozzle pointing east. The island is of volcanic origin, made of basaltic tuff and lava dating from the Miocene epoch. Phillip Island is included on the Register of the National Estate.

== Flora and fauna ==
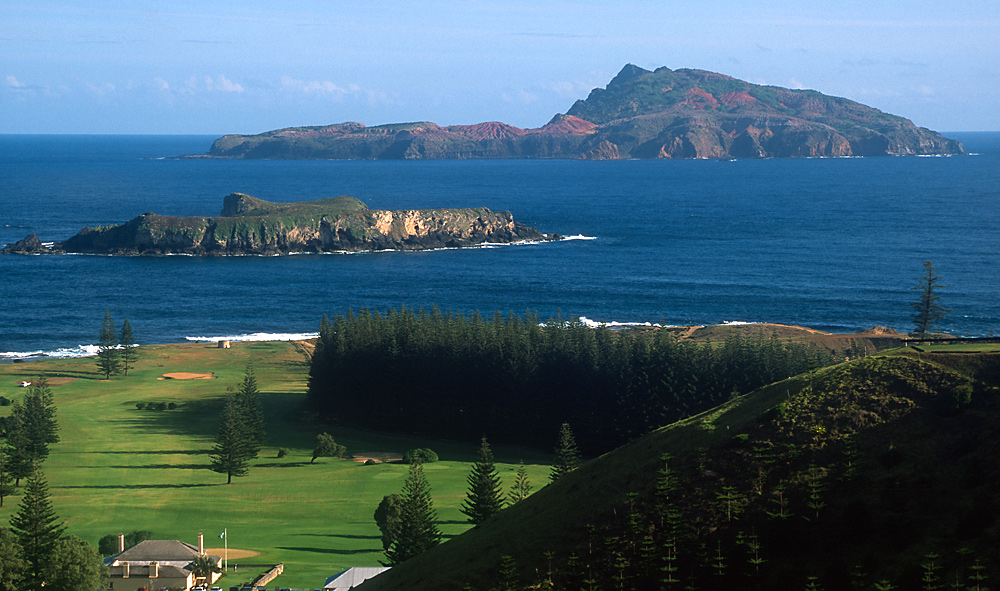
View from Norfolk Island showing Phillip Island in the distance. In the foreground is the smaller Nepean Island

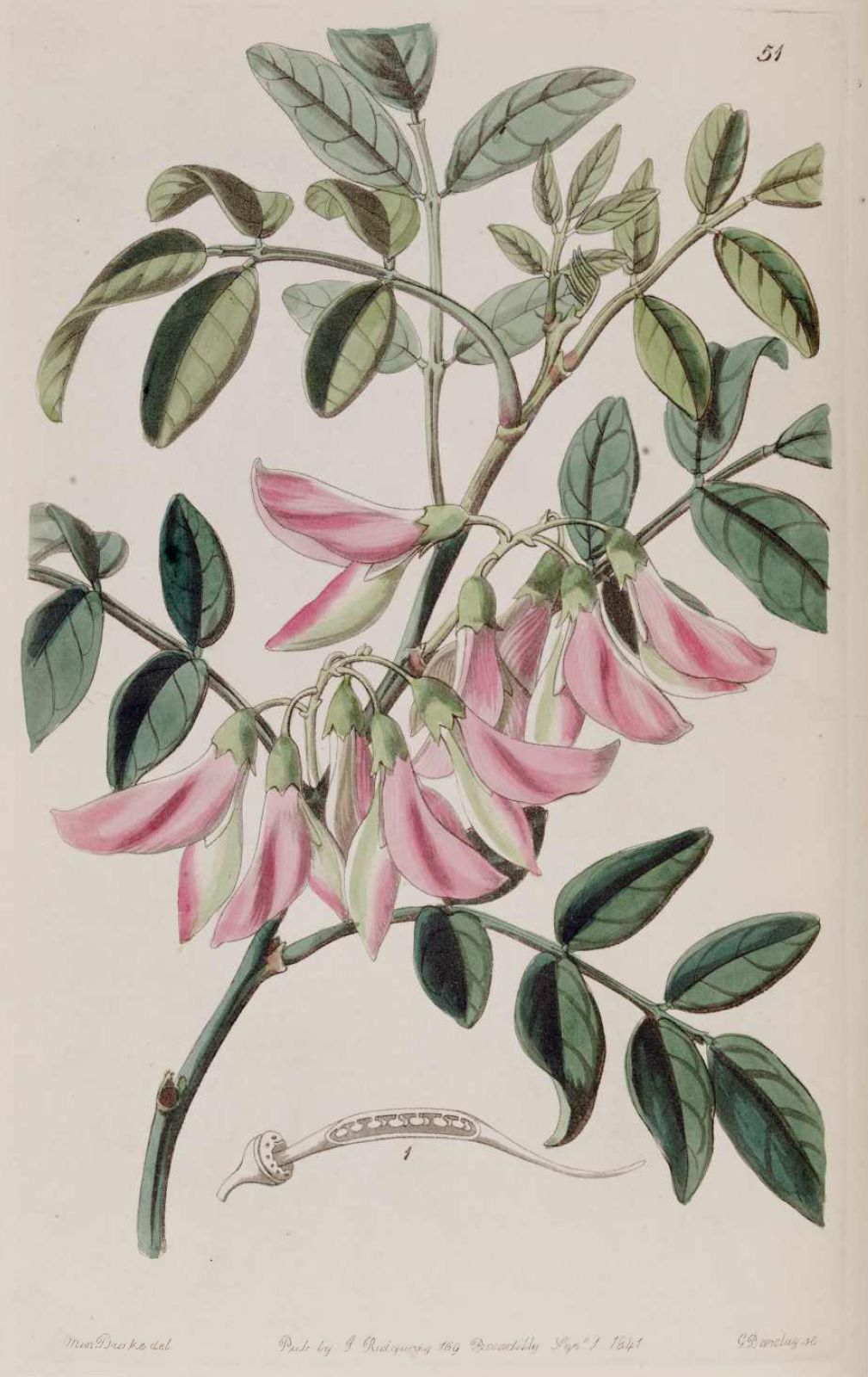
Streblorrhiza speciosa is an extinct plant which was endemic to Phillip Island

=== Plants ===
The vegetation of Phillip Island was devastated due to the introduction, during Norfolk's penal colony era, of pest animals such as pigs, goats and rabbits. This caused massive erosion, giving the island a reddish-brown colour as viewed from Norfolk, due to the absence of topsoil. However, the pigs and goats were removed by the early 20th century, and rabbits were exterminated by 1988.

Since then, natural regeneration of native species and weeds, and remediation work by park staff, has brought considerable improvement to Phillip Island's environment. Revegetation is currently underway. A substantial proportion of the areas which were bare before rabbit eradication began is now well vegetated, though much is weed species. Considering most of the island's surface was completely devoid of vegetation before rabbit control, the rate of vegetation development and soil formation is extraordinary. Burrow-nesting seabirds now have colonies where soil was absent before rabbit eradication.

Reforestation of Norfolk Island pine on Phillip Island was assisted in the late 1980s by a C130E Hercules from the RAAF's No. 37 Squadron based in Richmond. Record crops of Norfolk Island pine seeds were collected and aerial seeded on Phillip Island by the Hercules aircraft.

Phillip Island has a vascular flora of about 80 species. Three plant species are endemic to Phillip Island. Achyranthes margaretarum was discovered there after the rabbits had gone, and the current small population of this species is derived from the single original plant discovered. Abutilon julianae was rediscovered on Phillip Island when the rabbits had almost been eradicated; it had been believed extinct for more than seventy years. The third plant that grows only on this island is Hibiscus insularis.

=== Animals ===
Despite the environmental degradation, the lack of feral cats and rats on the island has allowed some animals to persist there after having become extinct on Norfolk. However, there are extinct species that lived on both islands, such as the Norfolk kaka. Two terrestrial reptiles—a gecko (Christinus guentheri), and a skink (Cyclodina lichenigera)—have been recorded. The island is also an important breeding site for 12 species of seabirds, including the providence petrel, Kermadec petrel, white-necked petrel, black-winged petrel, wedge-tailed shearwater, Australasian gannet, sooty tern (known locally as the whale bird), red-tailed tropicbird, and grey noddy. The sooty tern has traditionally been subject to seasonal egg harvesting.

Phillip Island has been identified by BirdLife International as an Important Bird Area (IBA), separate from the Norfolk Island IBA, because it supports small but increasing populations of providence and white-necked petrels as well as over 1% of the world population of grey noddies.
