= Mount Bates =

Mountain on Norfolk Island, Australia

- Location within Oceania

Highest point
- Elevation: 319 m (1,047 ft)
- Prominence: 319 m (1,047 ft)
- Coordinates: 29°01′06″S 167°56′08″E

Geography
- Location: Norfolk Island

Climbing
- Easiest route: South Side

Mount Bates (Pitcairn-Norfolk: Maun Biets) is the highest point of Norfolk Island, an external territory of Australia, at 319 m (1,047 ft) above sea level. Located in the island’s northwest quadrant, it is part of the Norfolk Island National Park, which also includes Mount Pitt and was established to conserve the remnant subtropical rainforests. The mountain is accessible a short and easy hiking route from Kingston, and features a picnic area at the summit.

== Geography ==
Mount Bates is situated in the northwest quadrant of Norfolk Island, which spans approximately 35 km^{2} (14 sq mi) in the Pacific Ocean between Australia and New Zealand. The elevation reaches 319 m (1,047 ft) with an equal prominence, confirming its status as the island’s highest peak. The peak is situated within the Norfolk Island National Park, a protected area established to preserve the remnant subtropical rainforest, the island's original vegetation and endemic flora. The tip of the mountain is located at a much higher altitude from the seabed than the height of Mount Everest, with the bulk of mountain submerged under the sea.

The mountain is composed of volcanic basalt rocks. The Norfolk Island rose out of volcanic activity that happened at the base of Mount Pitt and Mount Bates. Skeletal soil is found along the summit ridge between the mountains.

== Activities ==
The summit lies within gently rolling terrain, which is accessible by a short hiking trail starting near Kingston, and is accessible to casual hikers. Apart from hikers, it attracts amateur radio operators, and offers summit activities like picnicking and overall view of the island.
