= Christinus alexanderi =

Conservation status
- Least Concern (IUCN 3.1)

Scientific classification
- Kingdom: Animalia
- Phylum: Chordata
- Class: Reptilia
- Order: Squamata
- Suborder: Gekkota
- Family: Gekkonidae
- Genus: Christinus
- Species: C. alexanderi

Binomial name
- Christinus alexanderi Storr, 1987

Synonyms
- Phyllodactylus marmoratus alexanderi

Species of lizard

Christinus alexanderi, also known as Alexander's southern gecko or Alexander's marbled gecko, is a species of Gekkonidae geckos found in the Nullarbor Plain of Australia. It is one of the many species and subspecies regionally termed as marbled geckos.

== Classification ==
The species is one of three in the genus Christinus, placed in the Gekkonidae (gecko) subfamily Gekkoninae, and was first described by Glen Storr in 1987, as Phyllodactylus marmoratus alexanderi, before being elevated to its current status as Christinus alexanderi. The holotype specimen was collected at Eucla.

== Description ==
The superficial appearance of this species is similar to that of Christinus marmoratus, the more widespread marbled gecko, but is distinguished by its scales at the nostril and chin. The marbled pattern of the species also gives a resemblance to the Gehyra variegata, the variegated dtella, which is also found in its distribution range, but this species has claws on all its digits. The contrasted patterns of C. alexanderi is found in a variety of hues. They are frequently found sheltering under rocks.

== Reproduction ==
The males are recorded as sexually active from January to May, but the females do not produce eggs until the spring, September to October. The female is thought to store sperm through this winter period.

== Habitat ==
The species is endemic to the Nullarbor Plain, occurring in most habitats of the region. This includes coastal limestone and mallee woodlands.
