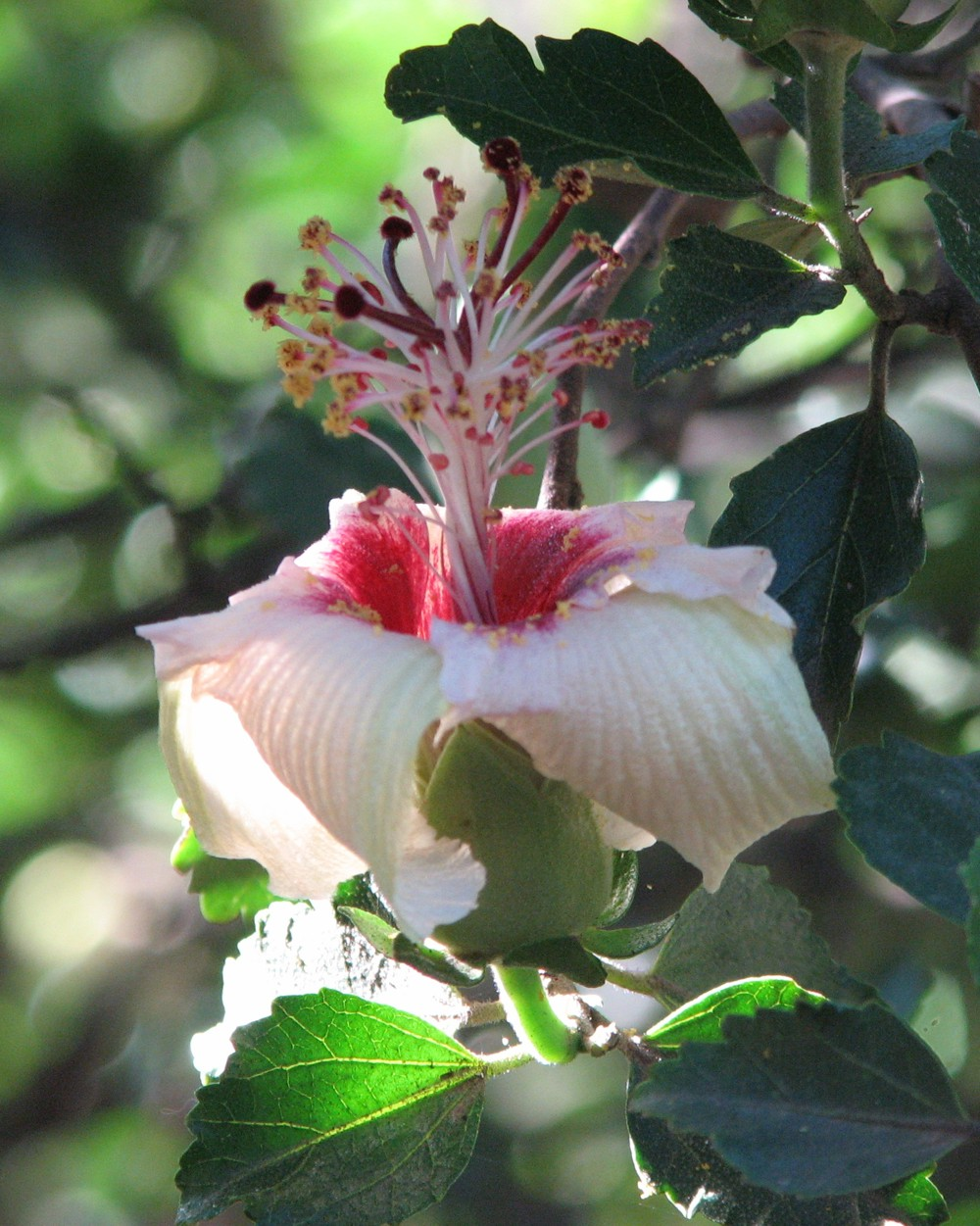

Conservation status
- Critically endangered (EPBC Act)

Scientific classification
- Kingdom: Plantae
- Clade: Tracheophytes
- Clade: Angiosperms
- Clade: Eudicots
- Clade: Rosids
- Order: Malvales
- Family: Malvaceae
- Genus: Hibiscus
- Species: H. insularis

Binomial name
- Hibiscus insularis Endl. (1833)

= Hibiscus insularis =

Phillip Island hibiscus

Species of flowering plant

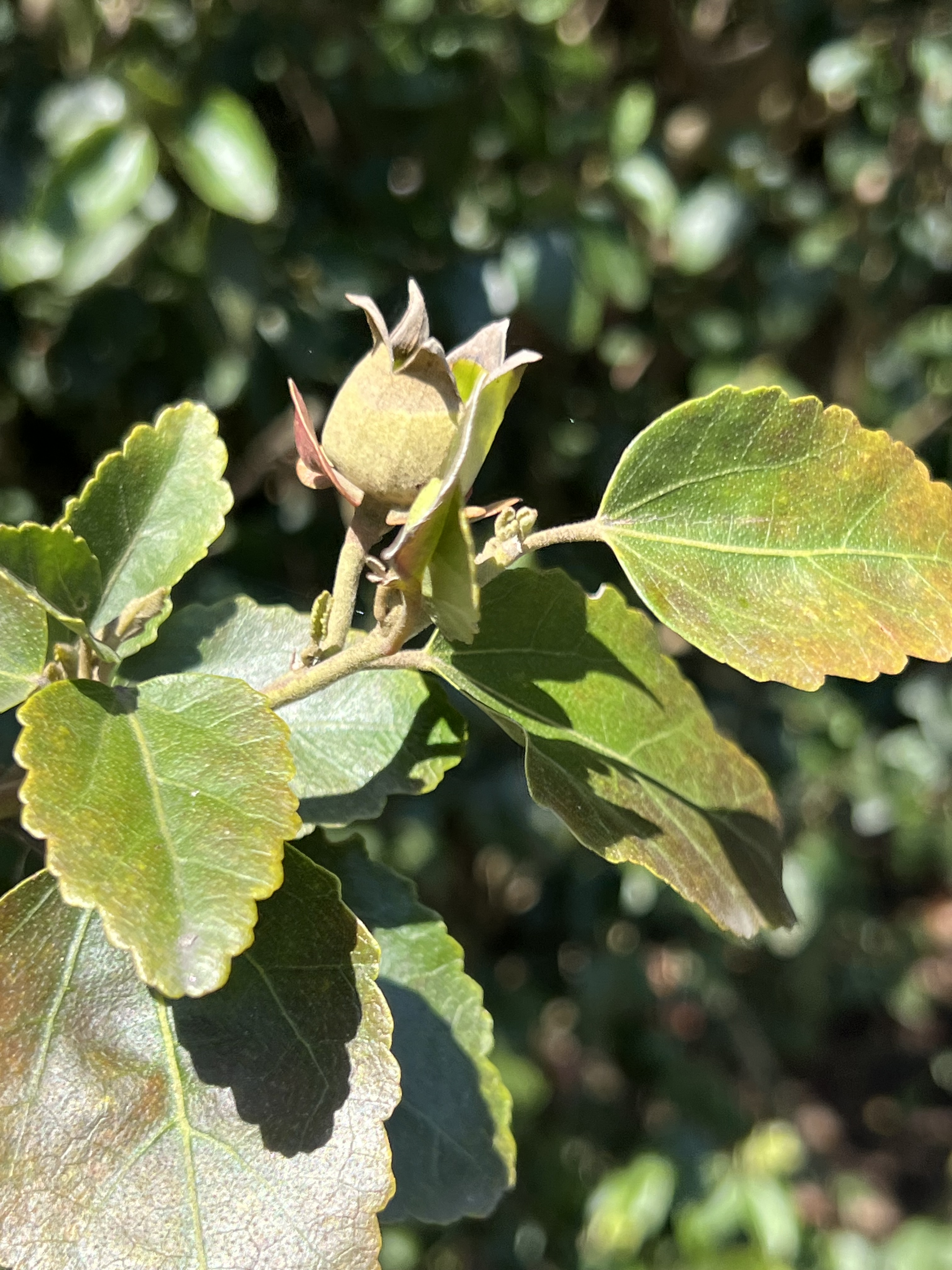
Foliage & fruit

Hibiscus insularis, the Phillip Island hibiscus, is a species of flowering plant in the mallow family Malvaceae, that is endemic to Phillip Island, a small island of the Territory of Norfolk Island, an Australian external territory in the South Pacific.

== Taxonomy and description ==
Hibiscus insularis, a member of Malvaceae, was first described in 1833, by Stephan Endlicher from a holotype collected by Ferdinand Bauer in October 1804.

Mature plants reach up to 2.5 m (8 ft 2 in) high. As seedlings they have very small leaves, which grow out into a deeply lobed form in juveline plants. The juvenile form may persist for up to 20 years before the plant assumes an adult form, with the leaves reaching a width of 3–5 cm (1.2–2.0 in) in length and 2–4 cm (0.79–1.57 in). The plants only flower once they reach their adult form, which combined with the slow maturing leads to a long generation time. Hibiscus insularis flowers produce a large amount of nectar, grow upwards at the ends of the plants branches and are solitary, rarely sharing a branch with another flower. The flowers have a dark magenta center with a surrounding colouration that is cream to light green when the flower first opens and which with age turns to reddish or purple.

Members of the species are female when their flowers open, and one day later they become male, at which stage they are capable of self-pollination. In the days that follow the flowers turn pink and close back up, and then wither. It is also believed that the species is bird-pollinated, and may have originally been pollinated by a now‑extinct species of bird. In addition to pollination, the species is able to reproduce vegitatively via stem-laying.

== Distribution ==
The species is endemic to Phillip Island, in the Territory of Norfolk Island, where its range was as of 2001 confined to three patches on the islands' northern slopes.

Outside of its native Phillip Island, Hibiscus insularis is widely planted on Norfolk Island, and is grown commercially in mainland Australia for horticultural use. Established botanic garden populations are found in the Norfolk Island Botanic Gardens, the Booderee National Park and Botanic Gardens in the Jervis Bay Territory, and the Royal Botanic Gardens Victoria in Melbourne.

== Conservation ==
The species, along with the flora of Phillip Island in general, entered into a decline after the introduction of pigs, goats and rabbits to the island and the subsequent establishment of feral populations of these grazing animals. Hibiscus insularis had a recorded population of 13 plants in 1939, and by 1963 this had fallen to 8. In 1988, the population on Phillips Island was restricted to two patches on the islands' northern slopes. A 1989 study found no evidence that the adult population of Hibiscus insularis consisted of more than a single adult.

The removal of grazing animals allowed Hibiscus insularis to begin to recover, but in 2003, with the number of mature plants in the wild numbering less than 50 spread across only three patches, it was designated as a critically endangered species under the Environment Protection and Biodiversity Conservation Act 1999 by the Department of Climate Change, Energy, the Environment and Water, on the advice of a scientific committee – a designation it retains as of 2026.

Modern threats to Hibiscus insularis include the invasive African olive, the moth caterpillars Pectinophora scutigera and Asinoplaca cosmia, soil erosion, hurricanes and low genetic diversity.
