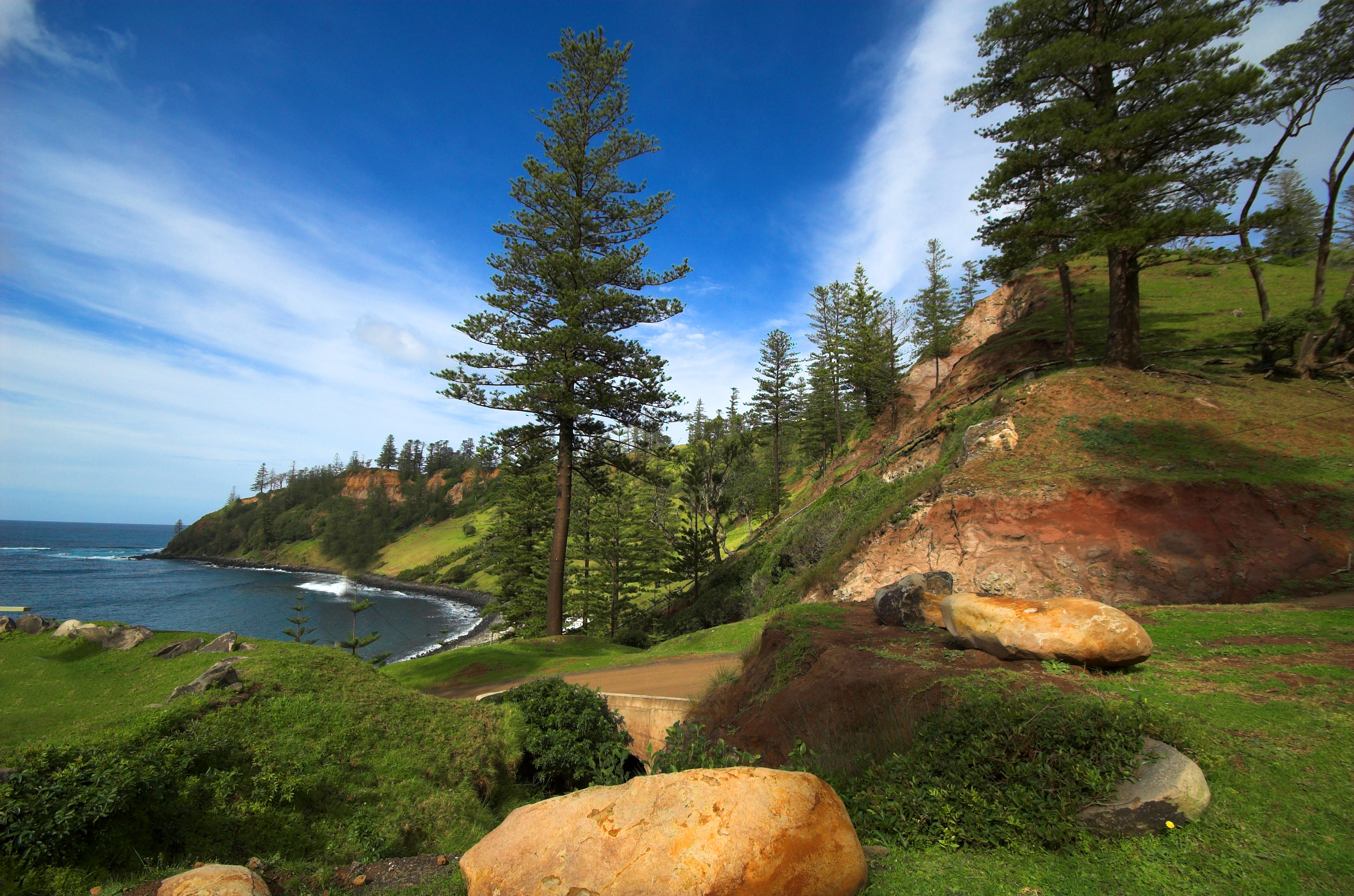

Conservation status
- Vulnerable (IUCN 3.1)

Scientific classification
- Kingdom: Plantae
- Clade: Tracheophytes
- Clade: Gymnosperms
- Division: Pinophyta
- Class: Pinopsida
- Order: Araucariales
- Family: Araucariaceae
- Genus: Araucaria
- Section: A. sect. Eutacta
- Species: A. heterophylla

Binomial name
- Araucaria heterophylla (Salisb.) Franco

Synonyms
- Araucaria excelsa var. glauca Carrière; Eutacta excelsa var. aurea-variegata Carrière; Eutacta excelsa var. glauca (Carrière) Carrière; Eutacta excelsa var. monstrosa Carrière; Eutacta excelsa var. variegata-alba Carrière; Eutassa heterophylla Salisb.

= Araucaria heterophylla =

Norfolk pine

Species of conifer tree

Araucaria heterophylla (synonym A. excelsa) is a species of conifer. As its vernacular name Norfolk Island pine (or Norfolk pine) implies, the tree is endemic to Norfolk Island, an external territory of Australia located in the Pacific Ocean between New Zealand and New Caledonia. It is not a true pine, which belong to the genus Pinus in the family Pinaceae, but instead is a member of the genus Araucaria in the family Araucariaceae, which also contains the hoop pine and the monkey-puzzle tree. It is sometimes also called a star pine, Polynesian pine, triangle tree or living Christmas tree, due to its symmetrical shape as a sapling.

== History ==
The first European known to have sighted Norfolk Island was Captain James Cook. In 1774, on his second voyage to the South Pacific in HMS Resolution, Cook noted the presence of large forests of tall, straight trees that appeared to be suitable for use as masts and yards for sailing ships. However, when the island was occupied in 1788 by convicts transported from Britain, it was found that Norfolk Island pine trees were not resilient enough for such use and the idea was abandoned.

In the late 1950s, a trial shipment of Norfolk pine logs was sent to plywood manufacturers in Sydney, New South Wales, with the hope of developing a timber export industry on Norfolk Island. Although the plywood companies reported excellent results, the industry was deemed not sustainable by the Norfolk Island Advisory Council, which decided to reserve timber production for local use. The timber is good for woodturning and, together with the similar Cook pine, is extensively used by Hawaiian artisans.

== Description ==
The tree is slow growing and can reach a height of 50–65 m (160–210 ft), with straight vertical trunks and symmetrical branches, even in the face of incessant onshore winds that can contort most other species. From the straight trunk, it emits five almost horizontal or slightly oblique branches, forming floors; the plane of each floor is a perfect pentagon. If kept indoors, the tree remains smaller. The grey-brown bark falls off in fine scales. The branchlets are four to seven in regular whorls.

The young leaves are soft and awl-shaped, 10–15 mm (0.4–0.6 in) long, about 1 mm (0.04 in) thick at the base on young trees, and incurved, 5–10 mm (0.2–0.4 in) long and variably 2–4 mm (0.1–0.2 in) broad on older trees. The thickest, scale-like leaves on coning branches are in the upper crown. The cones are squat globose, 10–12 cm (4–5 in) long and 12–14 cm (5–6 in) diameter, and take about 18 months to mature. They disintegrate at maturity to release the nut-like edible seeds. The seeds have a length of 2.5 to 3 cm (1.0 to 1.2 in) and a diameter of about 1.2 cm (0.5 in) with wide wings. There are four cotyledons present. It is a dioecious tree (male and female cones in different plants), although it can also be monoecious.

The scientific name heterophylla ('different leaves') derives from the variation in the leaves between young and adult plants.

== Cultivation ==
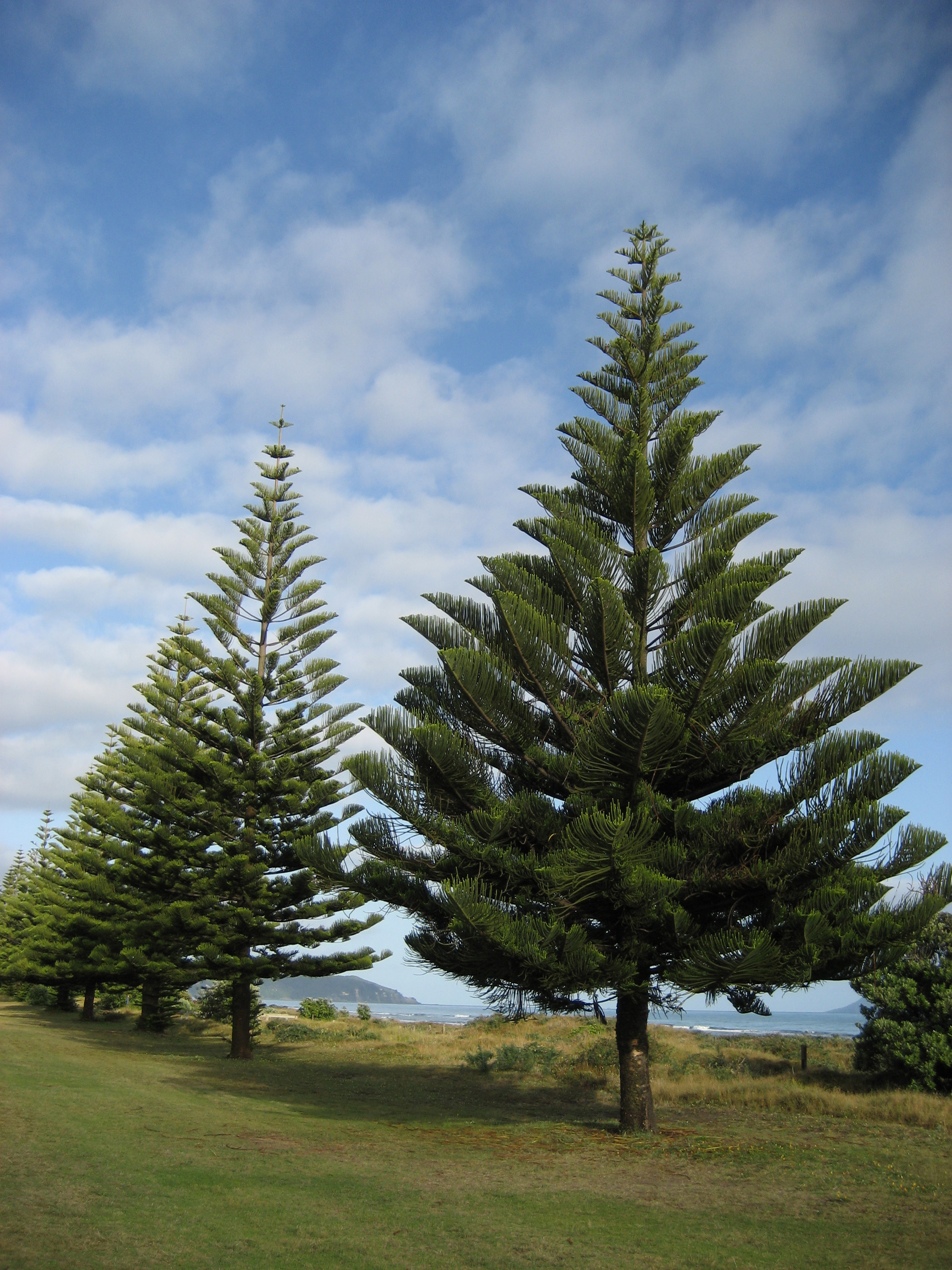
Young plants

The distinctive appearance of this tree, with its widely spaced branches and symmetrical, triangular outline, has made it a popular cultivated species, either as a single tree or in avenues. When the tree reaches maturity, the shape may become less symmetrical. Despite the endemic implication of the species name Norfolk Island pine, the species is widely planted as an ornamental tree for its exotic, pleasing appearance and fairly broad climatic adaptability, and now occurs throughout the world in regions with suitable Mediterranean and humid subtropical climate. It grows well in deep sand, as long as it receives reliable water when young. This, and its tolerance of salt and wind, make it ideal for coastal situations. Indoors, the plant needs a bright location with at least 40% but preferably above 60% humidity for good growth. Indoor trees must not be exposed to the scorching sun or dry air from a radiator; the temperature should ideally not exceed 22 °C (72 °F). In winter, the plant needs a bright room that should be around 17 °C (63 °F).

Many of the "Norfolk Island pines" that grow in Hawaii, including their descendants used as potted ornamentals on the U.S. mainland, are actually the closely related Cook pines native to New Caledonia, the two species having been confused when introduced.

=== Uses ===
Young trees are often grown as houseplants in areas where the winters are too cold for them to grow outside (they will not, for example, survive outdoors in most of North America or Europe), and are sometimes used as Christmas trees. It will not survive in areas subject to prolonged cold. However, there are a few specimens growing outdoors in the subtropical gardens of Tresco Abbey Gardens on the Isles of Scilly, in the United Kingdom. What is probably the most northerly specimen growing outdoors is a young tree on Valentia Island on the southwest coast of Ireland. The tendency for potted saplings to develop a barren appearance can be helped by growing them in clumps. In northern climates they can be left outdoors during summer or placed under growing lights to promote fuller growth.

When planted outside, the trees should be provided with adequate space, as they can grow to a large size. The trees are widely planted in coastal Southern California, where they can grow to well over 30 m (100 feet). The trees are commonly confused with Araucaria columnaris.

Araucaria heterophylla has gained the Royal Horticultural Society's Award of Garden Merit.

=== Conservation and weediness ===
The species’ survival is not threatened by the houseplant trade, as it is commercially cultivated for ornamental use. However, its native distribution has always been restricted and has declined significantly since European settlement. The species was originally present on Norfolk, Phillip and Nepean Islands. It has since been extirpated from Nepean Island and was largely eliminated from Phillip Island following habitat destruction and the introduction of invasive species. The principal remaining natural stands occur on Norfolk Island, particularly within Norfolk Island National Park, where they receive some protection. The IUCN classifies the species as vulnerable. Seedlings have also been reported spreading in coastal forest on New Zealand’s North Island, where it is considered part of the broader “wilding pine” issue.

== Gallery ==
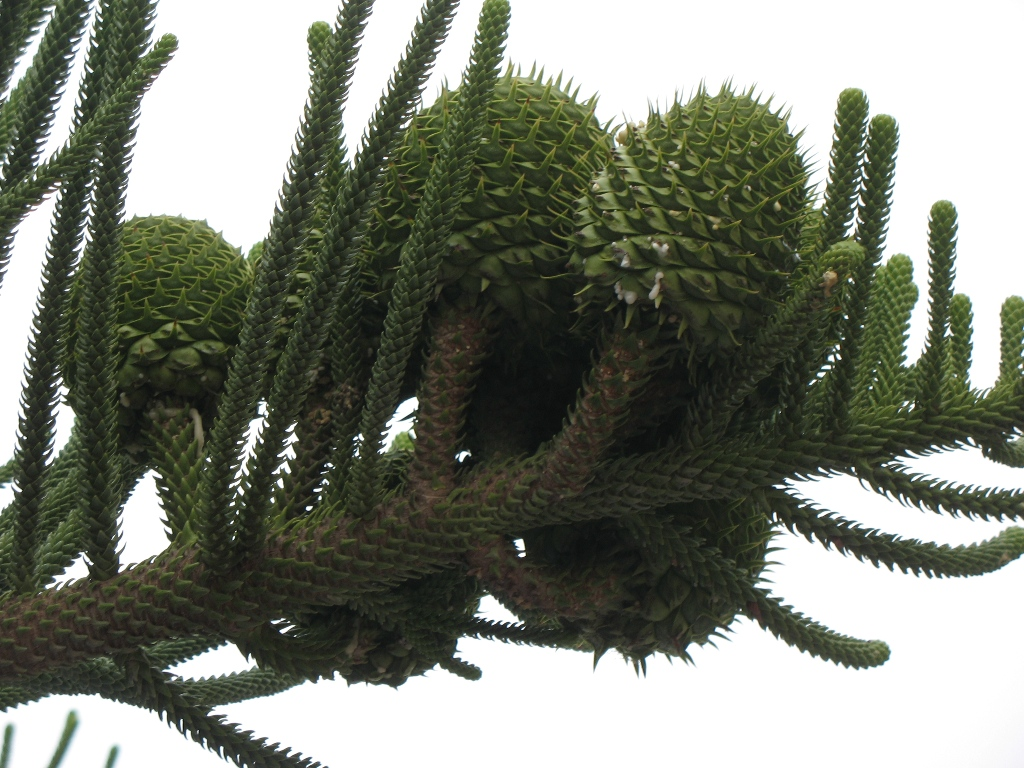
Cones and foliage

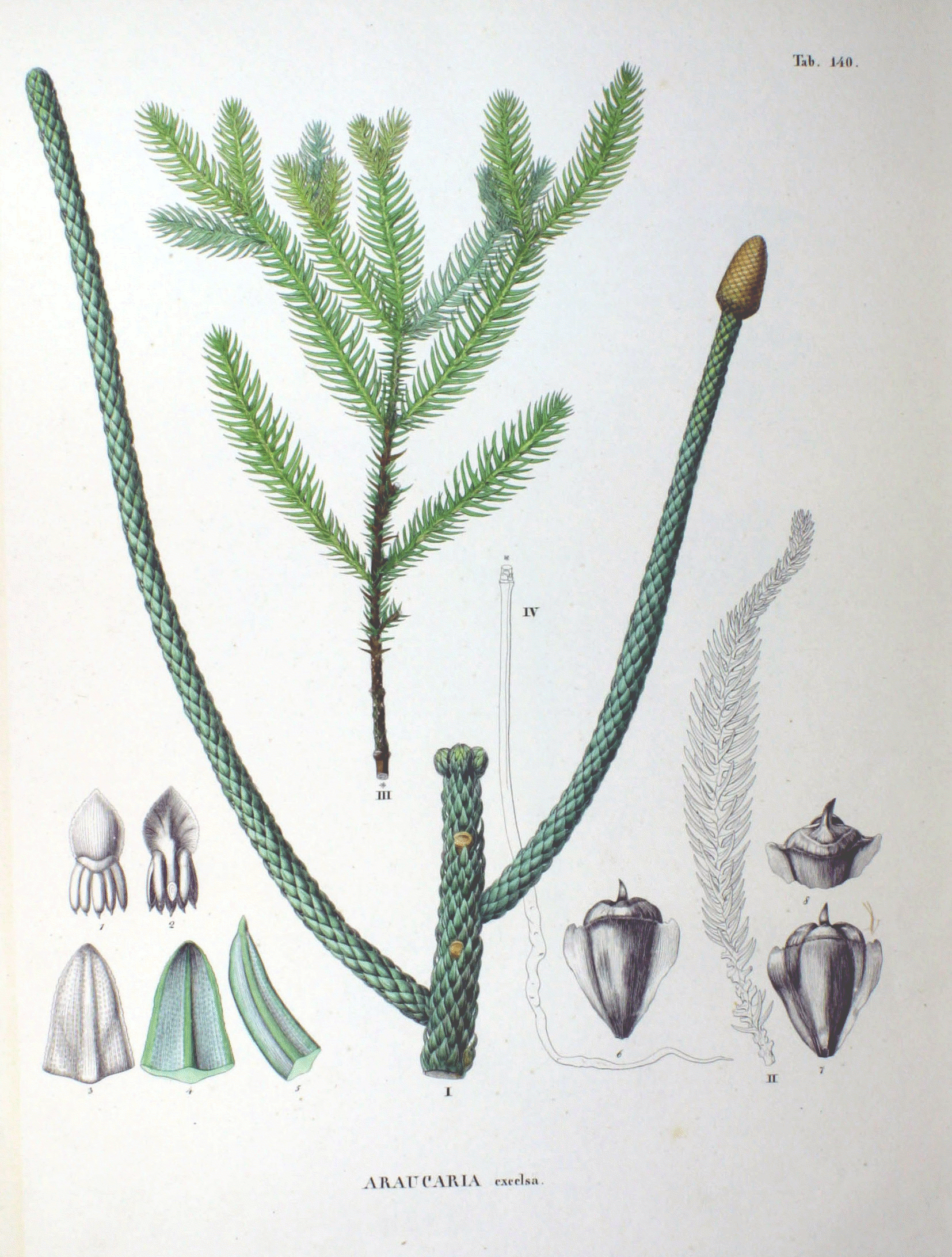
Botanical illustration

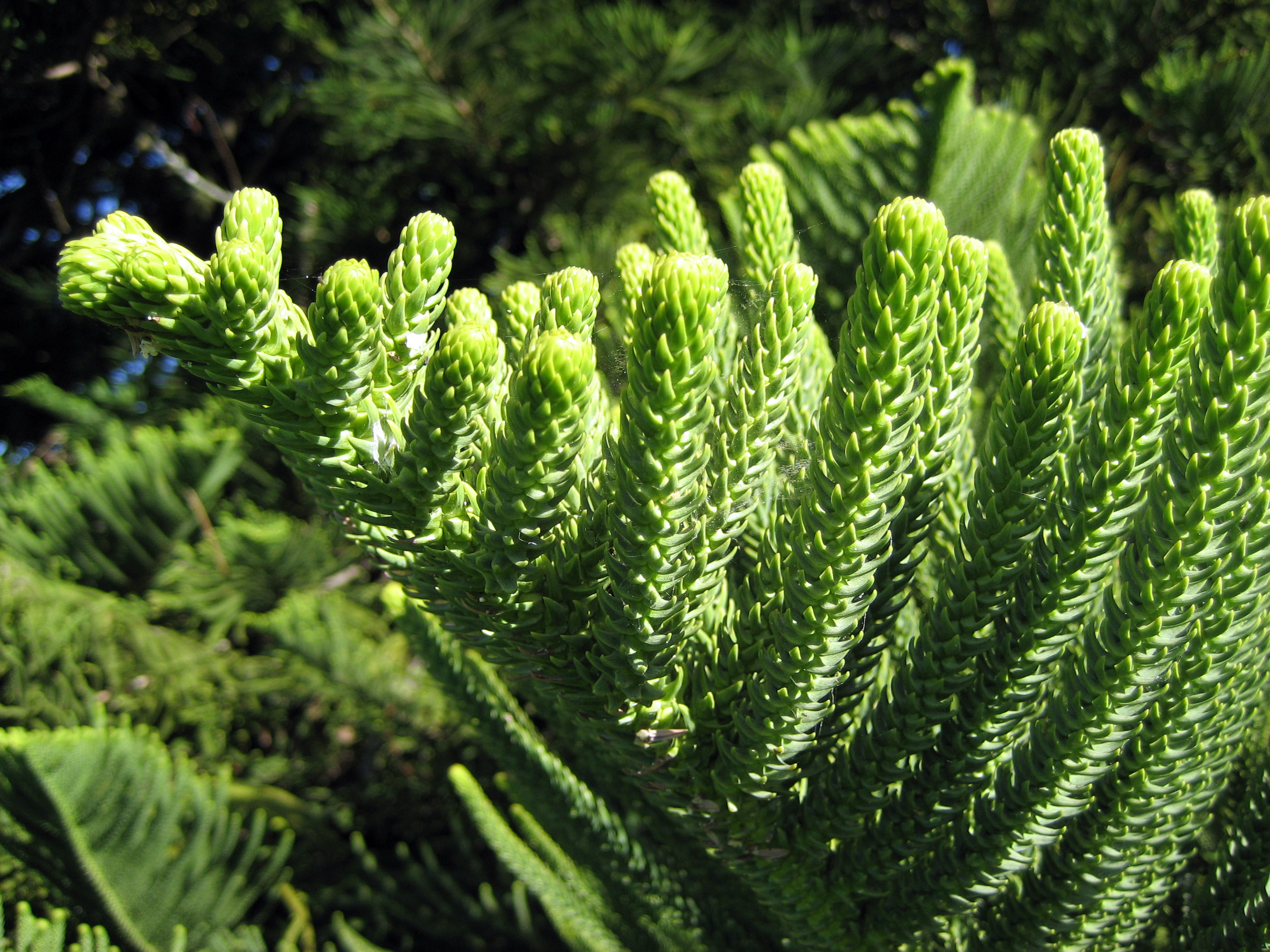
Foliage from a mature tree

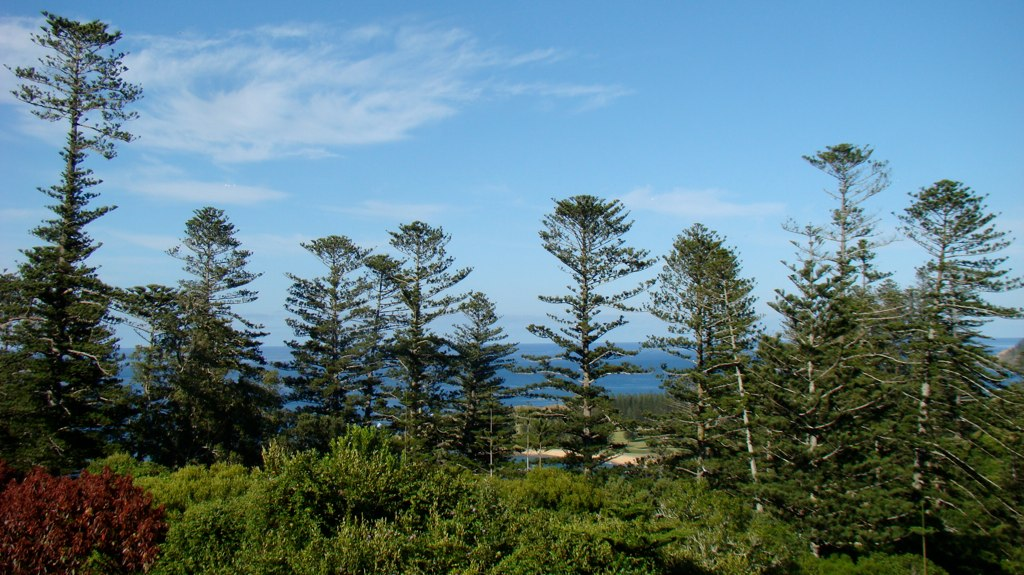
Stand of Araucaria heterophylla on Norfolk Island

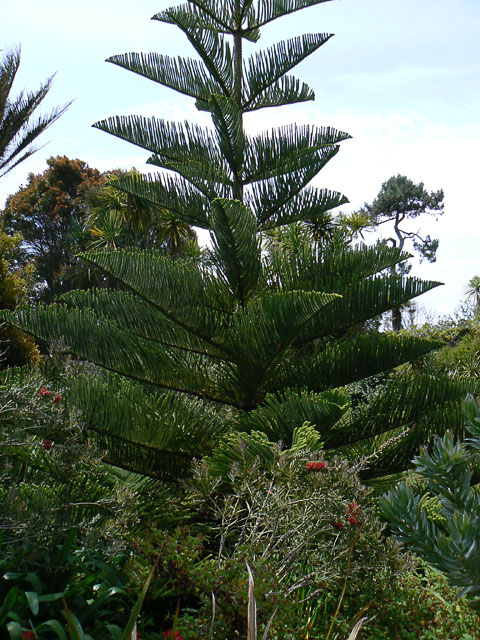
Abbey Gardens on Tresco, Isles of Scilly

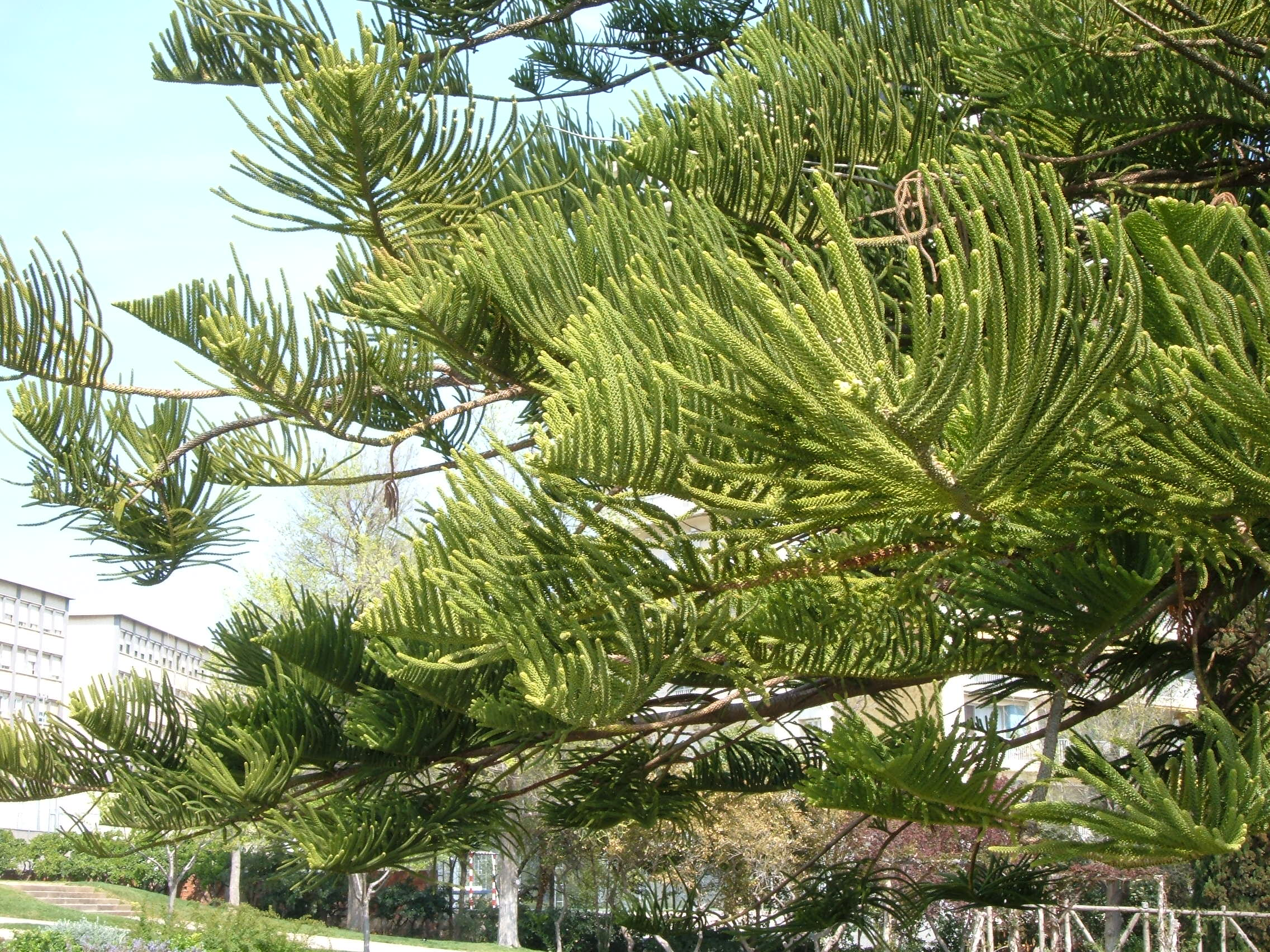
Branches and foliage in Barcelona, Spain
