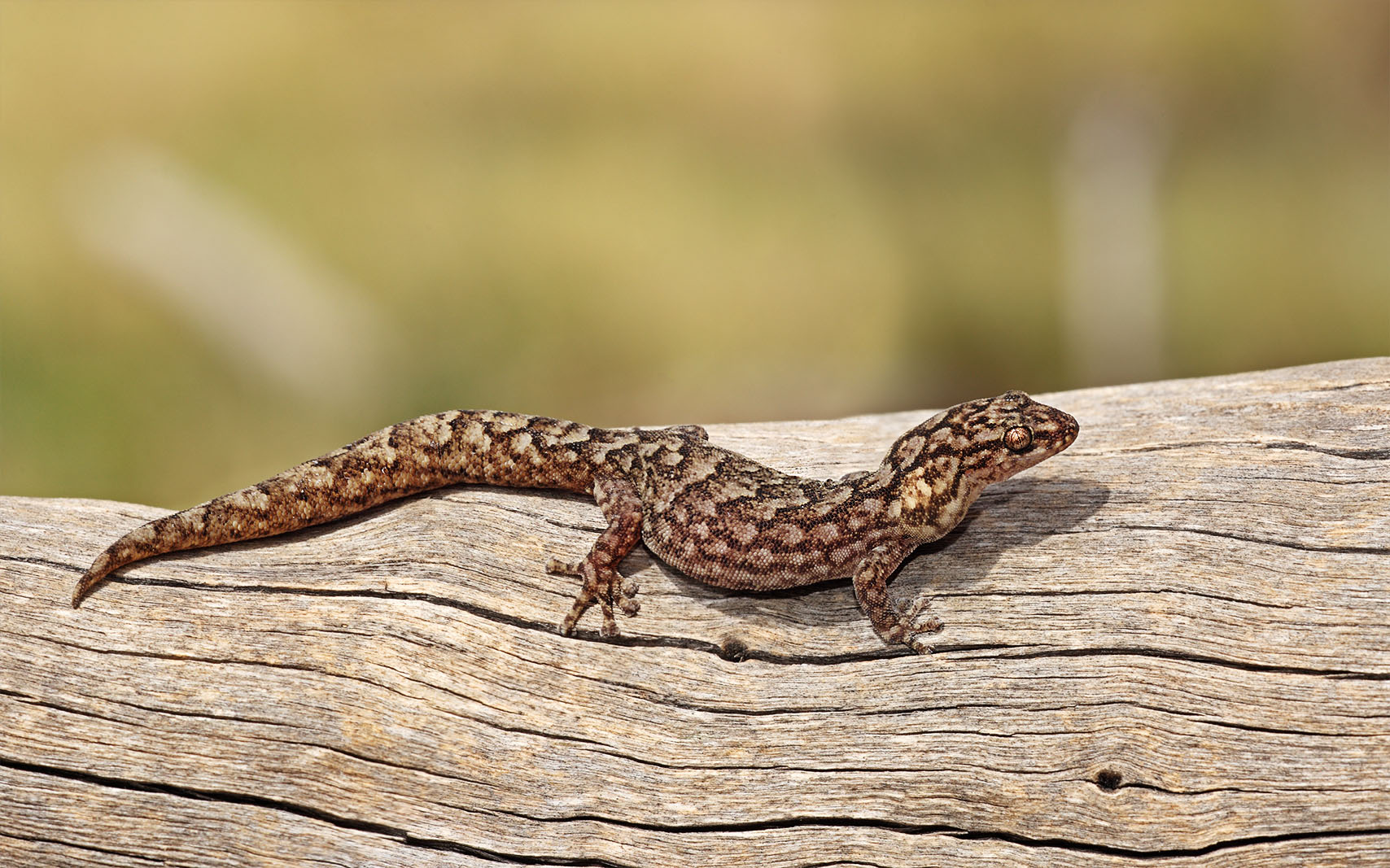

Scientific classification
- Domain: Eukaryota
- Kingdom: Animalia
- Phylum: Chordata
- Class: Reptilia
- Order: Squamata
- Infraorder: Gekkota
- Family: Gekkonidae
- Genus: Christinus
- Species: C. marmoratus

Binomial name
- Christinus marmoratus (Gray, 1845)

Synonyms
- Phyllodactylus marmoratus

= Christinus marmoratus =

Species of reptile endemic to Australia

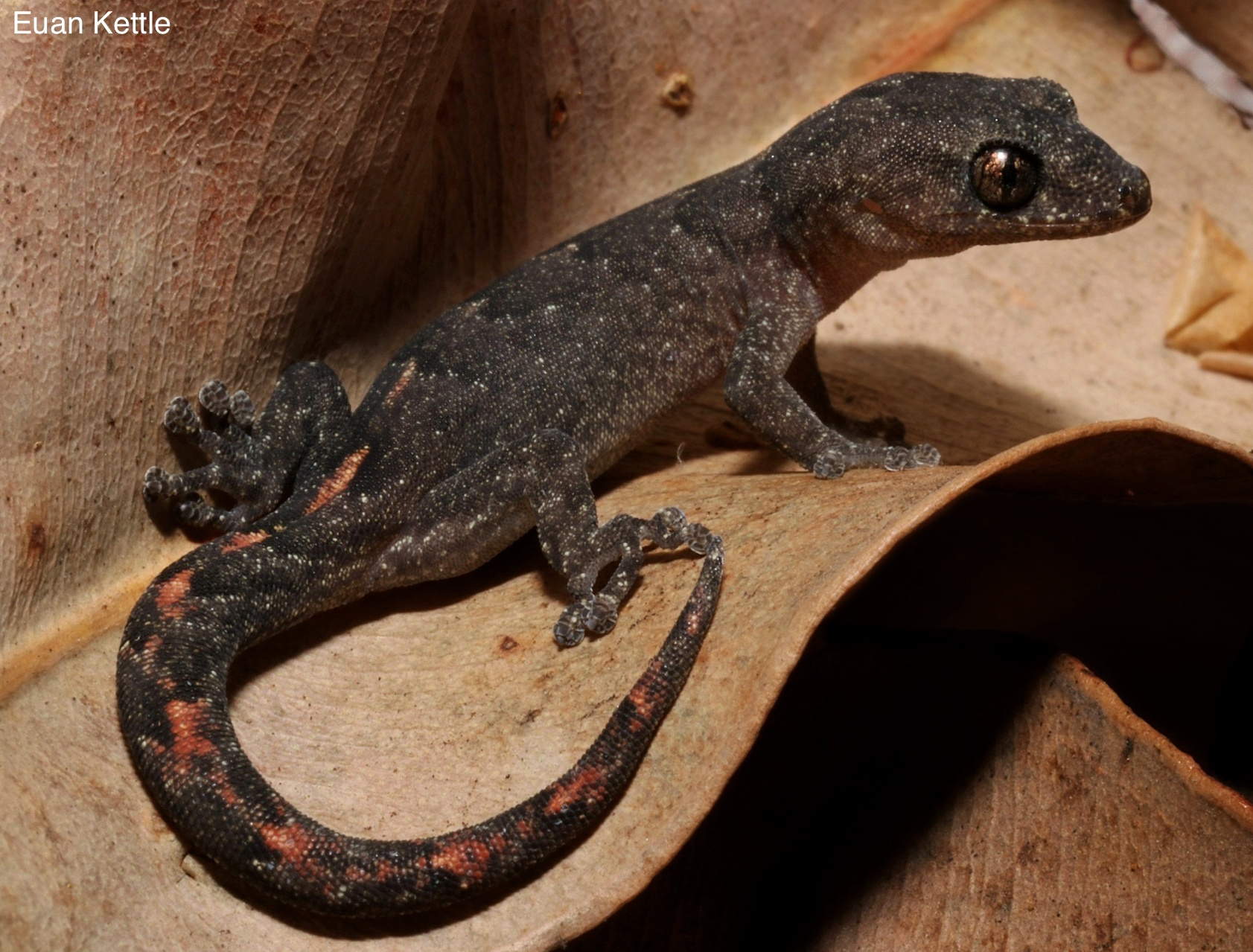
Christinus marmoratus

Christinus marmoratus, also known as marbled gecko or southern marbled gecko, is a species of Gekkonidae (gecko) native to southern mainland of Australia, from Victoria to Western Australia. The species is well adapted to a variety of habitats, including city dwellings.

== Taxonomy ==
The species was first formally described by John Edward Gray in 1845. The name he gave placed this group in the genus Diplodactylus as Diplodactylus marmoratus. Gray's description was based on four specimens that were preserved in spirits. They were collected on the Abrolhos Islands (off Western Australia), and were donated to the British Museum from the collection of a "Mr. Gilbert". Gray examined another preserved specimen of D. marmoratus (from a different donor) which was discoloured, leading him to mistakenly describe it as a separate species (Goniodactylus australis) in the same publication. In 1885, George Boulenger placed D. marmoratus in the genus Phyllodactylus (the leaf-toed geckos). It remained in that genus until 1984, when a revision by Wells and Wellington placed it in the genus Christinus.

A study conducted by King in 1977 showed that C. marmoratus exhibits considerable geographic variation in karyotype across its range. Further investigation by Donnellan et al. (2000) led to the species being recognized as a composite of two subspecies; C. marmoratus marmoratus and C. marmoratus dactylus. The two subspecies are commonly referred to as the western marbled gecko and the southern marbled gecko.

== Description ==
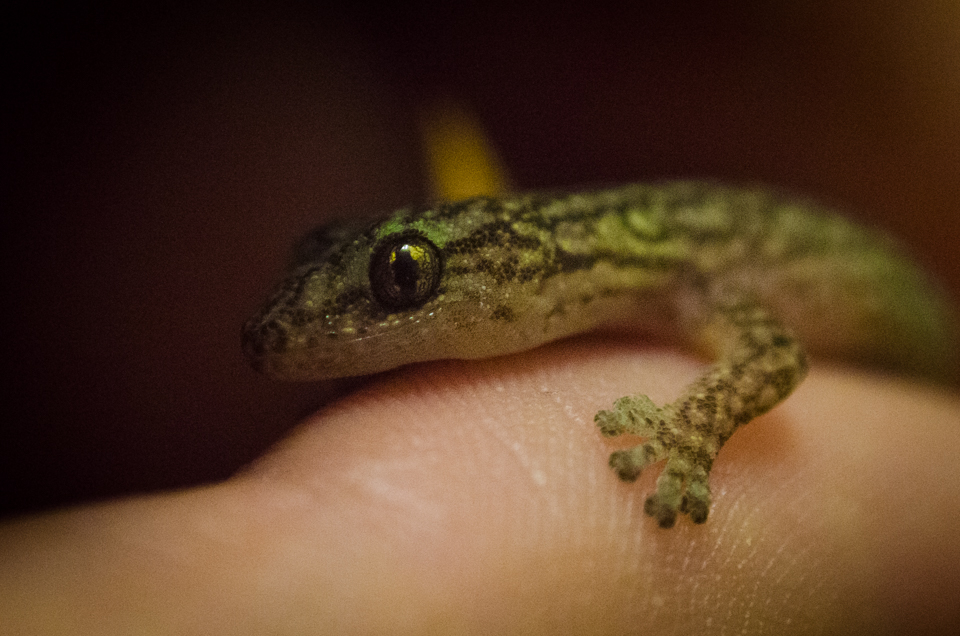
A head close-up of a marbled gecko (Christinus marmoratus). Note the pads on its feet.

Adults reach an average (snout-vent) length of 50mm, and weigh about 2.5g. C. marmoratus have fat reserves in their tails, which can be disconnected from their body (autotomy) when threatened, to aid in escape. Tails take about eight months to regenerate. Fully regenerated tails are characterized by an abrupt change in dorsal skin colouring and pattern at the level of the original fracture plane. Original tails also have much more developed muscular bands. C. marmoratus hatchlings do not have any fat in the tail, and they drop it more readily than adults do.

== Distribution and habitat ==
C. marmoratus is Australia’s most southerly gecko. It occurs from northeastern New South Wales to southwestern Western Australia, as well as a number of islands off the coasts of South Australia and Western Australia. They use a variety of habitats including open shrubland, sclerophyll forest, riverine woodland and urban regions.

== Ecology and behaviour ==
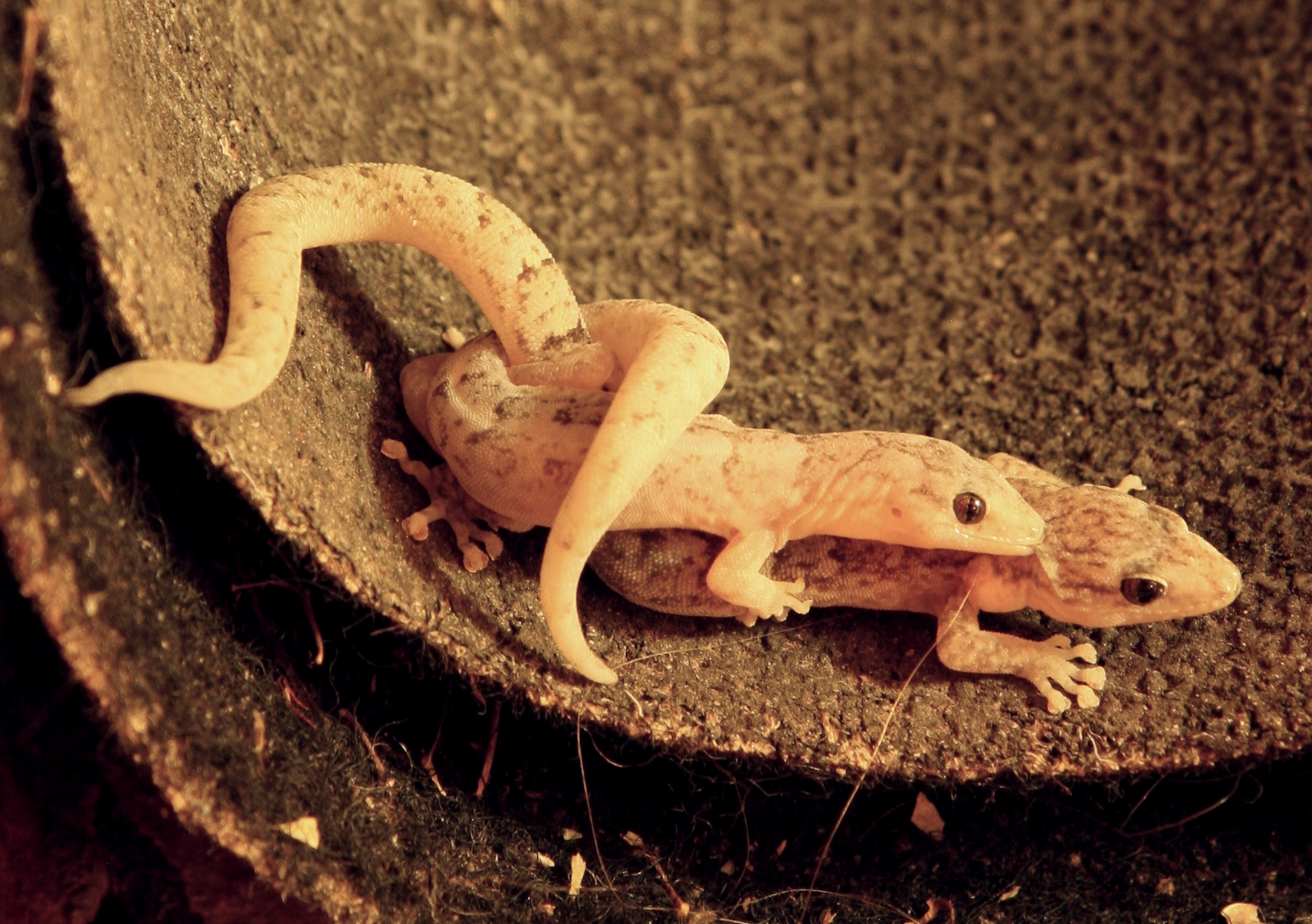
Male and female marbled geckos engaged in coitus.

C. marmoratus is insectivorous and nocturnal. During the hot summer months they generally use deep crevices and burrows as their daytime retreat sites, and in cooler weather they aggregate under rocks. Riverine populations generally rest under the thick exfoliating bark of large eucalyptus trees during the daytime. C. marmoratus are commonly found in aggregations of up to 10 individuals, and most aggregations contain one male. Given that many geckos have been reported to engage in territorial behaviour, it is surprising that C. marmoratus aggregate so commonly (Kearney et al. reported that one quarter of individuals they found were in aggregations). It has been suggested that this activity may be related to mating success, increased vigilance or simply attraction to high-quality habitat. Angiletta and Werner (1998) found that the preferred body temperature of C. marmoratus was 27.7 °C., which is much higher than their average body temperatures during the day or night. Subsequent investigation by Kearney and Predavec (2000) revealed that C. marmoratus may thermoregulate by adjusting its posture, for instance, by raising or flattening the body to contact the rock substrate. They also seem to touch the rock with their snout before doing so, as if testing the temperature. C. marmoratus rarely vocalise; when they do, it is usually a squeaking call in response to attack.
