= Lord Howe Island skink =

Conservation status
- Vulnerable (IUCN 3.1)

Scientific classification
- Kingdom: Animalia
- Phylum: Chordata
- Order: Squamata
- Family: Scincidae
- Genus: Oligosoma
- Species: O. lichenigerum

Binomial name
- Oligosoma lichenigerum (O'Shaughnessy, 1874)

Synonyms
- Cyclodina lichenigera (O'Shaughnessy, 1874); Leiolopisma lichenigerum (O'Shaughnessy, 1874); Mocoa lichenigera O'Shaughnessy, 1874; Pseudemoia lichenigera (O'Shaughnessy, 1874)

Species of reptile

The Lord Howe Island skink (Oligosoma lichenigerum) is a part of the native Australian reptiles' classification. The Lord Howe Island Skink is a species of skink in the family Scincidae, located on Australia's Norfolk Island and Lord Howe Island. The Lord Howe Island skink population is uncommon to be found on Lord Howe island, however the majority of their population is located on the Norfolk Island complex.This skink is metallic bronze in colour and has flecks for defining features. It can grow up to 8 cm in length, making them medium in size. Its taxonomy is diverse, the skink is a part of the Scincidae family, Oligosoma genus. This skink population is protected and considered vulnerable under the Environment Protection and biodiversity conservation act 1999.

== Ecology ==
=== Description ===
The Lord Howe Island skink (Oligosoma lichenigera) is metallic bronze or olive in colour on the top. It has brown flecks or streaks that are aligned longitudinally along the body, often with brown spots on the head. It has a pale golden stripe that extends from above the eye to the tail, which is its distinguishing feature. The upper body usually has pale spots, with the throat been a grey/white colour with dark grey-brown flecks and pale/dark brown limb depending on the size and age of the Lord Howe Island Skink. It can grow up to 8 cm in length, making them medium in size for this type of skink. Its life span is currently unknown; however research suggests that the larger skinks can live up to 10 years.

=== Other names ===
The Lord Howe Island Skink (Oligosoma lichenigera) has previously been referred to by other names. These names include Cyclodina lichenigera, Leiolopisma lichenigerum, Mocoa lichenigera and Pseudemoia lichenigera and can interchange between academic articles.

=== Diet ===
Lord Howe island skinks are said to feed on beetles, spiders, moths, ants and other invertebrates amongst the leaf litter as it is in abundance on both Norfolk Island and Lord Howe Island, as it is easy for the skinks to obtain. From research it is also believed that the Lord Howe Island Skink feeds on tern eggs that they have pushed down a hill and cracked open to feed on.

== Distribution and habitat ==
The Lord Howe Island skink can be found on both Lord Howe Island and the Norfolk Island complex. The Lord Howe island skink is considered native to both of these islands. As both Islands are isolated from the mainland of Australia, this has enabled the Lord Howe Island skink population to grow. The Lord Howe Island skink is however uncommon to be found on Lord Howe island and the majority of their population is located on the Norfolk Island complex, specifically on Phillip Island, which is an island that is located just off the main Norfolk Island complex.They can be found in a wide range of habitats, ranging from rainforest to grasslands. They are often found under and amongst boulders and rocks. They can also shelter during the day under rocks, in cavities on boulder beaches, in tunnels and holes in rocks, and in crevices in trees. This native skink (Oligosoma lichenigera) is occasionally diurnal, meaning active during the day but it is primarily crepuscular/nocturnal, meaning that it is more active during the night and sleeps during the day.

== Reproduction ==
Not much is known about the reproduction of the Lord Howe Island Skink. They lay a clutch of around 1-3 eggs per reproduction cycle and have an incubation of around 68 days.

== Status and conservation ==
The Lord Howe Island skink are a species that is listed as Vulnerable under the Environment Protection and biodiversity conservation act 1999. However, the Lord Howe island skinks species is estimated to have populations on both Norfolk Island and Lord Howe island that are large and secure. To try and preserve the Lord Howe Island skink population the Australian government has put in measures to try and stop the decrease of the population to try and get the skink off the vulnerable list.

=== Measures to help the population recovery of the Lord Howe Island Skink ===
- Control and eradication of introduced rodents, such as rabbits and non-native geckoes.
- Establish rodent baiting stations on key offshore islands to prevent establishment of rodents and the transfer of them onto Norfolk and Lord Howe Island.
- Protect habitat from disturbance, particularly from humans, weather and introduced animal species to these islands.
- Continue vegetation regeneration program, providing more protected and safer areas for the skink.
- Implement and monitor a quarantine plan to prevent any diseases that may be harmful to the skink.
- Monitor the status of populations and note if there is an increase.
- Investigate the impacts of the introduced Grass Skink on the food resources of the Lord Howe Island Skink.
- Research into ecology and genetics of the species to provide information to assist in its conservation.

=== Threats ===
There are a few threats that can shorten the life span of the Lord Howe Island skink. Rats preying upon this species is the main reasons for the population decline on the main islands of the Norfolk and Lord Howe Island complexes. As the Lord Howe Island skink is endemic to the oceanic islands of Lord Howe island and Norfolk Island complexes it is impossible to find them located anywhere else. The populations of the Lord Howe Island skink underwent major declines on the inhabited main Lord Howe Island following the introduction of R. rattus (a species of black rats) from a shipwreck in 1927. Although the skink remains abundant on several offshore islets that remain rat-free there is limited population on the main islands due to the rat population. On Norfolk Island, the introduction of the Polynesian Rat (R. exulans) by Polynesian visitors led to the extinction of the Lord Howe Island skink on the main island, however the skink is abundant and secure on the largest of the offshore islands (Phillip Island).

In the past it was recorded that cats would also prey on the Lord Howe Island Skink, hence why the population in listed as vulnerable. However no cats remain on Lord Howe Island, so they are no longer a threat and the population is increasing. Another threat is the introduced skink lampropholis delicata which arrived on Lord Howe Island and Norfolk Island in the early 1990s and is said to compete with the Lord Howe Island skink for food.
