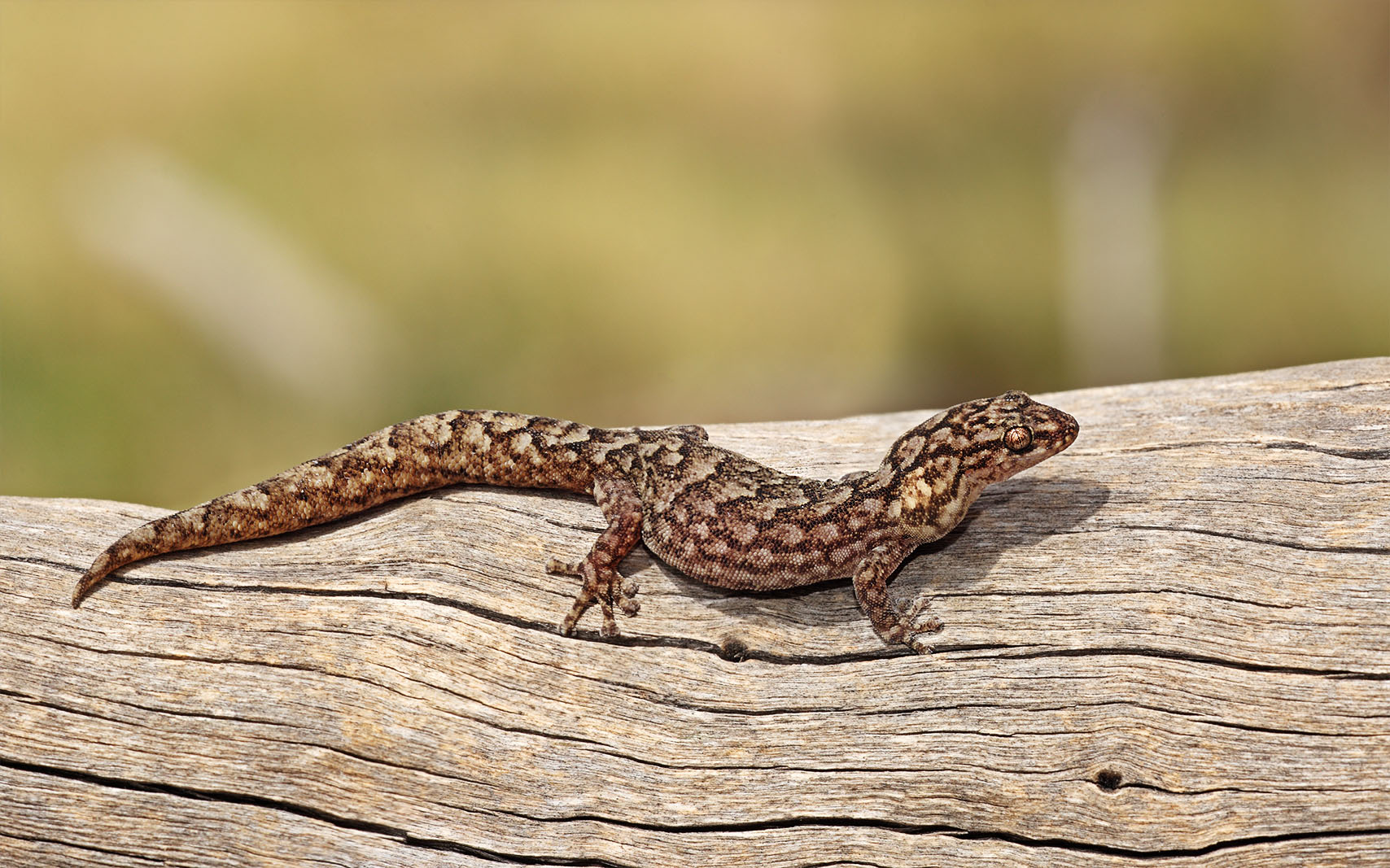
- Christinus marmoratus

Scientific classification
- Kingdom: Animalia
- Phylum: Chordata
- Class: Reptilia
- Order: Squamata
- Suborder: Gekkota
- Family: Gekkonidae
- Subfamily: Uroplatinae
- Genus: Christinus (Wells and Wellington, 1984)

= Christinus =

Genus of lizards

Christinus is a genus of Gekkonidae geckos found in southern regions of Australia. It contains species and subspecies that are regionally termed as marbled geckos. The contrasted patterns of these geckos, marbling, are found in a variety of reddish-brown, grey, silver, white, black and purplish hues. They are frequently found in old knotted trees and sometimes congregate in large numbers in established urban environments.

The genus was named for Christine Biggs, a friend of one of the authors.

== Classification ==
Christinus was first described by Wells and Wellington in 1984, giving the types species as that published as Diplodactylus marmoratus Gray 1845. Their later proposal to establish a genus Ridegekko, based on Boulenger's original description of Phyllodactylus guentheri (C. guentheri), is not given in later literature. The genus has been described as containing two species, the island population and the widespread southern population. The latter, C. marmoratus, has two or more subspecies in its distribution range. One proposed subspecies, Christinus marmoratus alexanderi Storr, has been elevated by some authorities to the rank of species.

== Species ==
- C. alexanderi (endemic to Nullarbor Plain)
- C. guentheri, (Lord Howe and Norfolk Island)
- C. marmoratus, (widespread: southern mainland, northwest interior, islands)
  - C. m. macrodactylus
  - C. m. marmoratus
