= Christinus guentheri =

Conservation status
- Vulnerable (IUCN 3.1)

Scientific classification
- Kingdom: Animalia
- Phylum: Chordata
- Class: Reptilia
- Order: Squamata
- Suborder: Gekkota
- Family: Gekkonidae
- Genus: Christinus
- Species: C. guentheri

Binomial name
- Christinus guentheri (Boulenger, 1885)

Synonyms
- Phyllodactylus guentheri Boulenger, 1885; Christinus guentheri — Wells & Wellington, 1984

Species of lizard

Christinus guentheri is a species of lizard in the family Gekkonidae (geckos). The species is endemic to two Australian islands, Norfolk Island and Lord Howe Island.

== Common names ==
C. guentheri has the common names Günther's island gecko, Lord Howe Island gecko, and Lord Howe Island southern gecko.

== Taxonomy ==
The first description of C. guentheri was by Belgian-born British herpetologist George Albert Boulenger, in 1885, as Phyllodactylus guentheri.

== Etymology ==
The specific epithet, guentheri, commemorates German-born British zoologist Albert Günther.

== Habitat ==
The preferred natural habitats of C. guentheri are forest and rocky areas.

== Behavior ==
C. guentheri is terrestrial, arboreal, and saxicolous (rock-dwelling).

== Reproduction ==
C. guentheri is oviparous. Each adult female lays a single egg, in a communal oviposition site, which may be in a root system, a rock crevice, or a cave.

== Conservation status ==
C. guentheri is listed as vulnerable by the IUCN, and by the Australian government's EPBC act.
