= 2004 Norfolk Island legislative election =

← 2001	20 October 2004	2007 →

All 9 seats on the Legislative Assembly
- Registered: 1,332
- Turnout: 91.22%
	First party
	IND
Leader	N/A
Party	Independents
Last election	9 seats
Seats won	9
Seat change	Steady
Chief Minister before election
Geoff Gardner
Independent
Resulting Chief Minister
Geoff Gardner
Independent

The 2004 Norfolk Island legislative election was held on 20 October 2004 to elect the 11th Norfolk Island Legislative Assembly, the prime legislative body of Norfolk Island.

The election was held three months after the murder of Assembly member Ivens Buffett, who also served as Deputy Chief Minister and Lands Minister. His seat remained vacant until the election.

Geoff Gardner remained Chief Minister following the election.

== Electoral system ==
Electors each had nine equal votes, which could be divided in any way between candidates, but no more than four votes could be given to any particular individual candidate. This variation of cumulative voting is called "weighted first past the post".

== Results ==
14 candidates contested the election.

Party	Candidate	Votes	%	±%
Independent	Geoff Gardner (elected)	1,809	17.22	
Independent	Tim Sheridan (elected)	1,436	13.67	
Independent	Neville Christian (elected)	949	9.04	
Independent	Lorraine Boudan (elected)	838	7.98	
Independent	Ron Nobbs (elected)	810	7.71	
Independent	David Buffett (elected)	755	7.19	
Independent	John Brown (elected)	674	6.42	
Independent	Vicky Jack (elected)	652	6.21	
Independent	Tim Brown (elected)	628	5.98	
Independent	Chloe Barbara Nicholas	566	5.39	
Independent	Ric Newton Ion Robinson	512	4.87	
Independent	John Walsh	426	4.06	
Independent	Terence Jope	226	2.15	
Independent	Craig Andrew Robinson	222	2.11	
Total formal votes		10,503	100.0	
Total formal ballots		1,167	96.05	
Informal votes		48	3.95	
Turnout		1,215	91.22	
