= 2010 Norfolk Island legislative election =

- 17 March 2010

All 9 seats on the Legislative Assembly

	First party	Second party	Third party
	IND
Leader	N/A	Mike King	Craig Anderson
Party	Independents	Labor	Liberal
Last election	8 seats	Did not contest	1 seat
Seats won	7	1	1
Seat change	▼1	▲1	Steady
Popular vote	9,085	1,309	834
Percentage	77.75%	13.59%	8.66%
Swing	▼15.44pp	▲13.59pp	▲1.85pp
Chief Minister before election
Andre Nobbs
Independent
Resulting Chief Minister
David Buffett
Independent

The 2010 Norfolk Island legislative election was held on 17 March 2010 to elect the 13th Norfolk Island Legislative Assembly, the prime legislative body of Norfolk Island.

Following the elections, David Buffett replaced Andre Nobbs as Chief Minister on 24 March, having returned to the Assembly after losing his seat at the previous election in 2007.

== Background ==
Nine members are elected to the Assembly for a three-year term. Electors each have nine equal votes, which could be divided in any way between candidates, but no more than two votes could be given to any particular individual candidate. This variation of cumulative voting is called "weighted first past the post".

The Norfolk Island Labor Party and Norfolk Liberals both contested the election. Labor, led by Mike King, ran four candidates, while incumbent MLA Ian Anderson led the Liberals.

== Results ==
965 votes (83.05%) were cast in-person inside Rawson Hall, with an additional 105 absentee votes (9.04%). Counting was completed the following day on 18 March.

Party	Candidate	Votes	%	±%
Independent	Timothy Sheridan (elected)	934	9.70	+3.35
Liberal	Craig Anderson (elected)	813	8.44	+8.44
Independent	Andre Nobbs (elected)	717	7.45	−5.52
Independent	David Buffett (elected)	576	5.98	+2.33
Independent	Melissa Ward (elected)	554	5.75	+5.75
Labor	Mike King (elected)	545	5.66	+5.66
Independent	Lisle Snell (elected)	472	4.90	−1.79
Independent	Rhonda Griffiths (elected)	459	4.77	+4.77
Independent	Robin Adams (elected)	452	4.69	+4.69
Independent	Neville Christian	445	4.62	−2.69
Independent	Brendon Christian	385	4.00	−7.84
Labor	Allan Tavenor	358	3.72	+3.72
Independent	Robert Goldsworthy	313	3.25	+3.25
Independent	Ric Robinson	297	3.08	+3.08
Independent	Richard Kleiner	269	2.79	+2.79
Independent	Wallace Beadman	257	2.67	+2.67
Independent	Stephanie Jack	254	2.64	−5.66
Independent	Frederick Howe	232	2.41	+1.29
Labor	Brendon King	215	2.23	+2.23
Labor	Julie Burns	191	1.98	+1.98
Independent	Phillip Jones	169	1.75	+1.75
Independent	Nadia Cuthbertson	164	1.70	+1.70
Independent	Greame Woolley	158	1.64	+1.64
Independent	Maureen King	144	1.50	–1.74
Independent	Norris Buffett	109	1.13	+1.13
Independent	Terence Jope	88	0.91	−1.20
Independent	Douglas Jackson	39	0.40	+0.40
Liberal	Ian Anderson	21	0.22	−6.59
Total formal votes		9,630	100.0	
Total formal ballots		1,070	92.08	−1.59
Informal votes		92	7.92	+1.59
