= 2013 Norfolk Island legislative election =

Election in Norfolk

- 13 March 2013

All 9 seats on the Legislative Assembly
| | First party | Second party |
|---|---|---|
| | IND |
| Leader | N/A | Dave Porter |
| Party | Independents | Liberal |
| Last election | 8 seats | 1 seat |
| Seats won | 8 | 1 |
| Seat change | Steady | Steady |
Chief Minister before election
David Buffett
Independent
Resulting Chief Minister
Lisle Snell
Independent

The 2013 Norfolk Island legislative election was held on 13 March 2013 to elect the 14th Norfolk Island Legislative Assembly, the prime legislative body of Norfolk Island.

This was the last election for the Assembly before it was abolished in 2015 and replaced with the Norfolk Island Regional Council as part of the removal of Norfolk Island's semi-self-governing status.

Following the elections, Lisle Snell replaced David Buffett as Chief Minister on 24 March.

== Background ==
Nine members are elected to the Assembly for a three-year term. Electors each have nine equal votes, which could be divided in any way between candidates, but no more than two votes could be given to any particular individual candidate. This variation of cumulative voting is called "weighted first past the post".

Incumbent members Craig Anderson (Liberal), Mike King (Labor) and Andre Nobbs (independent) did not seek re-election in 2013. The Norfolk Island Labor Party − led by King − did not contest the election, however the Norfolk Liberals ran two candidates.

== Results ==
15 candidates ran at the election.

| Party | Candidate | Votes | % | ±% |
|---|---|---|---|---|
| Independent | Lisle Snell (elected) | 869 | 9.93 | |
| Independent | Robin Adams (elected) | 781 | 8.93 | |
| Independent | Ronald Ward (elected) | 767 | 8.77 | |
| Independent | Timothy Sheridan (elected) | 744 | 8.50 | |
| Independent | Melissa Ward (elected) | 715 | 8.17 | |
| Independent | David Buffett (elected) | 709 | 8.10 | |
| Liberal | Dave Porter (elected) | 704 | 8.05 | |
| Independent | Ronald Nobbs (elected) | 647 | 7.40 | |
| Independent | Hadyn Evans (elected) | 636 | 7.27 | |
| Independent | John Kelly | 440 | 5.03 | |
| Independent | Fred Howe | 420 | 4.80 | |
| Independent | Rhonda Griffiths | 420 | 4.80 | |
| Independent | Neville Christian | 387 | 4.42 | |
| Independent | Terence Jope | 303 | 3.46 | |
| Liberal | Ian Anderson | 206 | 2.35 | |
| Total formal votes | | 8,748 | 100.0 | |
| Total formal ballots | | 972 | 94.83 | |
| Informal votes | | 53 | 5.17 | |
| Turnout | | 1,025 | 93.52 | |
