= Outline of Norfolk Island =

Overview of and topical guide to Norfolk Island

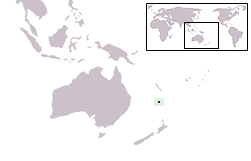
The location of Norfolk Island

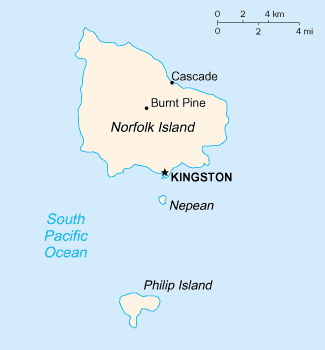
An enlargeable map of the Australian Territory of Norfolk Island

The following outline is provided as an overview of and topical guide to Norfolk Island:

The Australian Territory of Norfolk Island comprises Norfolk Island and two uninhabited neighboring islands located in the South Pacific Ocean amidst Australia, New Zealand and New Caledonia. Norfolk Island is one of Australia's external territories.

The Norfolk Island pine, a symbol of the island pictured in its flag, is an evergreen tree native to the island.

The Flag of Norfolk Island

The Coat of arms of Norfolk Island

== General reference ==
- Pronunciation:
- Common English country name: Norfolk Island
- Official English country name: The Australian Territory of Norfolk Island
- Common endonym(s): Norf'k Ailen
- Official endonym(s):
- Adjectival(s): Norfolk Island
- Demonym(s): Norfolk Islander
- Etymology
- ISO country codes: NF, NFK, 574
- ISO region codes: See ISO 3166-2:NF
- Internet country code top-level domain: .nf

== Geography of Norfolk Island ==
Geography of Norfolk Island

- Norfolk Island is: an island and an external territory of Australia
- Location:
  - Southern Hemisphere and Eastern Hemisphere
    - Pacific Ocean
      - South Pacific
        - Oceania
          - Australasia
  - Time zone: UTC+11:30
  - Extreme points of Norfolk Island
    - High: Mount Bates 319 m (1,047 ft)
    - Low: South Pacific Ocean 0 m
  - Land boundaries: none
  - Coastline: South Pacific Ocean 32 km
- Area of Norfolk Island: 34 km^{2}
- Atlas of Norfolk Island

=== Environment of Norfolk Island ===
- Climate of Norfolk Island
- Renewable energy in Norfolk Island
- Geology of Norfolk Island
- Protected areas of Norfolk Island
  - Biosphere reserves in Norfolk Island
  - National parks of Norfolk Island
- Wildlife of Norfolk Island
  - Fauna of Norfolk Island
    - Birds of Norfolk Island
    - Mammals of Norfolk Island

==== Natural geographic features of Norfolk Island ====
- Fjords of Norfolk Island
- Glaciers of Norfolk Island
- Islands of Norfolk Island
- Lakes of Norfolk Island
- Mountains of Norfolk Island
  - Volcanoes in Norfolk Island
- Rivers of Norfolk Island
  - Waterfalls of Norfolk Island
- Valleys of Norfolk Island
- World Heritage Sites in Norfolk Island: None

=== Regions of Norfolk Island ===
Regions of Norfolk Island

==== Ecoregions of Norfolk Island ====
List of ecoregions in Norfolk Island

- Ecoregions in Norfolk Island

==== Administrative divisions of Norfolk Island ====
None

===== Municipalities of Norfolk Island =====
- Capital of Norfolk Island: Kingston
- Cities of Norfolk Island

=== Demography of Norfolk Island ===
Demographics of Norfolk Island

== Government and politics of Norfolk Island ==
Politics of Norfolk Island

- Form of government:
- Capital of Norfolk Island: Kingston
- Elections in Norfolk Island
- Political parties in Norfolk Island

=== Branches of the government of Norfolk Island ===
Government of Norfolk Island

==== Executive branch of the government of Norfolk Island ====
- Head of state: Administrator of Norfolk Island appointed by and responsible to the Governor-General of Australia
- Head of government: Chief Minister of Norfolk Island,
- Cabinet of Norfolk Island

==== Legislative branch of the government of Norfolk Island ====
- Norfolk Island Legislative Assembly
- Norfolk Island Regional Council

==== Judicial branch of the government of Norfolk Island ====
Court system of Norfolk Island

- Supreme Court of Norfolk Island

=== Foreign relations of Norfolk Island ===
Foreign relations of Norfolk Island

- Diplomatic missions in Norfolk Island
- Diplomatic missions of Norfolk Island

==== International organisation membership ====
The Australian Territory of Norfolk Island is a member of:

- Universal Postal Union (UPU)

=== Law and order in Norfolk Island ===
Law of Norfolk Island

- Constitution of Norfolk Island
- Crime in Norfolk Island
- Human rights in Norfolk Island
  - LGBT rights in Norfolk Island
  - Freedom of religion in Norfolk Island
- Law enforcement in Norfolk Island

=== Military of Norfolk Island ===
Military of Norfolk Island

- Command
  - Commander-in-chief:
    - Ministry of Defence of Norfolk Island
- Forces
  - Army of Norfolk Island
  - Navy of Norfolk Island
  - Air Force of Norfolk Island
  - Special forces of Norfolk Island
- Military history of Norfolk Island
- Military ranks of Norfolk Island

=== Local government in Norfolk Island ===
Local government in Norfolk Island

== History of Norfolk Island ==
History of Norfolk Island

- Timeline of the history of Norfolk Island
- Current events of Norfolk Island
- Military history of Norfolk Island

== Culture of Norfolk Island ==
Culture of Norfolk Island

- Architecture of Norfolk Island
- Cuisine of Norfolk Island
- Festivals in Norfolk Island
- Languages of Norfolk Island
- Media in Norfolk Island
  - List of newspapers in Norfolk Island
- National symbols of Norfolk Island
  - Coat of arms of Norfolk Island
  - Flag of Norfolk Island
  - National anthem of Norfolk Island:
    - God Save the Queen, the official anthem
    - Pitcairn Anthem, the unofficial anthem
- People of Norfolk Island
- Public holidays in Norfolk Island
- Records of Norfolk Island
- Religion in Norfolk Island
  - Bahá‘í Faith in Norfolk Island
  - Buddhism in Norfolk Island
  - Christianity in Norfolk Island
  - Falun Gong in Norfolk Island
  - Hinduism in Norfolk Island
  - Irreligion in Norfolk Island
  - Islam in Norfolk Island
  - Judaism in Norfolk Island
  - Sikhism in Norfolk Island
- World Heritage Sites in Norfolk Island: None

=== Art in Norfolk Island ===
- Art in Norfolk Island
- Cinema of Norfolk Island
- Literature of Norfolk Island
- Music of Norfolk Island
- Television in Norfolk Island
- Theatre in Norfolk Island

=== Sports in Norfolk Island ===
- Sports in Norfolk Island
  - Athletics in Norfolk Island
  - Australian rules football in Norfolk Island
  - Baseball in Norfolk Island
  - Basketball in Norfolk Island
  - Cricket in Norfolk Island
  - E-sports in Norfolk Island
  - Lawn bowls in Norfolk Island
  - Mountain biking in Norfolk Island
  - Rugby league in Norfolk Island
  - Rugby union in Norfolk Island
  - Soccer in Norfolk Island
  - Surfing in Norfolk Island
  - Swimming in Norfolk Island
- Norfolk Island at the Commonwealth Games
- Norfolk Island at the Olympics

== Economy and infrastructure of Norfolk Island ==
Economy of Norfolk Island

- Economic rank, by nominal GDP (2007):
- Agriculture in Norfolk Island
- Banking in Norfolk Island
  - National Bank of Norfolk Island
- Communications in Norfolk Island
  - Internet in Norfolk Island
- Companies of Norfolk Island
- Currency of Norfolk Island: Dollar
  - ISO 4217: AUD
- Energy in Norfolk Island
  - Energy policy of Norfolk Island
  - Oil industry in Norfolk Island
- Mining in Norfolk Island
- Tourism in Norfolk Island
- Transport in Norfolk Island
- Norfolk Island Stock Exchange

== Education in Norfolk Island ==
Education in Norfolk Island

== Infrastructure of Norfolk Island ==
- Health care in Norfolk Island
- Transportation on Norfolk Island
  - Airports in Norfolk Island
  - Rail transport in Norfolk Island
  - Roads in Norfolk Island
- Water supply and sanitation in Norfolk Island

== See also ==
Norfolk Island

- Index of Norfolk Island-related articles
- List of international rankings
- List of Norfolk Island-related topics
- Outline of Australia
- Outline of geography
- Outline of Oceania
