= 2000 Norfolk Island legislative election =

Election in Norfolk

← 1997	23 February 2000	2001 →

All 9 seats on the Legislative Assembly
	First party
	IND
Leader	N/A
Party	Independents
Last election	9 seats
Seats won	9
Seat change	Steady
Popular vote	8,946
Percentage	100%
Chief Minister before election
George Smith
Independent
Resulting Chief Minister
Ronald Nobbs
Independent

The 2000 Norfolk Island legislative election was held on 23 February 2000 to elect the 9 members of the Norfolk Island Legislative Assembly, the legislative body of Norfolk Island.

Following the election, a referendum was held on whether new elections should be held in 2001, instead of the scheduled date of 2003. The referendum was successful, and the next election was brought forward to 29 November 2001.

== Results ==
Party	Candidate	Votes	%	±%
Independent	Ronald Nobbs (elected)	1,347	15.06	
Independent	Geoff Gardner (elected)	1,262	14.11	
Independent	Adrian Cook (elected)	1,104	12.34	
Independent	George Smith (elected)	801	8.95	
Independent	David Buffett (elected)	787	8.80	
Independent	Alan McCoy (elected)	741	8.28	
Independent	Bruce Walker (elected)	618	6.91	
Independent	Brian Bates (elected)	410	4.58	
Independent	John Brown (elected)	375	4.19	
Independent	Cedric Newton Ion-Robinson	341	3.81	
Independent	James Robertson	339	3.79	
Independent	Graeme Woolley	331	3.70	
Independent	Neville Christian	256	2.86	
Independent	David Evans	234	2.62	
Total formal votes		8,946	100.0	
