= 2016 Norfolk Island local election =

- 28 May 2016
	First party	Second party
	IND
Leader	N/A	Dave Porter
Party	Independents	Liberal
Last election	8 seats	1 seat
Seats won	4	1
Seat change	▼4	Steady
Popular vote	795	147
Percentage	84.39%	15.61%
Resulting Mayor
Robin Adams
Independent

The 2016 Norfolk Island local election was held on 28 May 2016 to elect the Norfolk Island Regional Council, the local government body of Norfolk Island.

This was the first election for the council since the Norfolk Island Legislative Assembly was abolished in 2015 as part of the removal of Norfolk Island's semi-self-governing status.

Following the election, Robin Adams was elected mayor through a vote of councillors at the formal establishment of the council on 1 July 2016.

== Background ==
Norfolk Island Regional Council is subject to the state-level legislation of New South Wales. Unlike most local government bodies in Australia, the council delivers many Commonwealth services to residents in addition to local-level services such as land planning and emergency management.

The council has five members, down from the eight members that the Assembly had.

The election was conducted by the Australian Election Company and results were finalised on 31 May 2016. Unlike the previous Assembly elections, a quota was used, replacing a variation of cumulative voting known as "weighted first past the post".

== Results ==
Party	Candidate	Votes	%	±%
Quota		158		
Independent	Rod Buffett (elected 1)	190	20.17	
Independent	Lisle Snell (elected 2)	149	15.81	
Liberal	Dave Porter (elected 3)	147	15.61	
Independent	Robin Adams (elected 5)	107	11.36	
Independent	John McCoy (elected 4)	97	10.30	
Independent	David Buffett	90	9.55	
Independent	Lyle Tavener	66	7.01	
Independent	Tim Brown	38	4.03	
Independent	Kim Davies	29	3.08	
Independent	Graham White	29	3.08	
Total formal votes		942	100.0	

=== Count progression ===
2016 Norfolk Island local election
Party	Candidate	FPv%	Count					
Party	Candidate	FPv%	1	2	3	4	5	6
Independent	Rod Buffett	20.17	190					
Independent	Lisle Snell	15.82	149	151	161			
Liberal	Dave Porter	15.61	147	155	156	164		
Independent	Robin Adams	11.36	107	109	113	119	133	137
Independent	John McCoy	10.30	97	101	105	111	123	144
Independent	David Buffett	9.55	90	93	96	100	106	124
Independent	Lyle Tavener	7.01	66	74	79	80	87	
Independent	Tim Brown	4.03	38	40	41	44		
Independent	Graham White	3.08	29	31	36			
Independent	Kim Davies	3.08	29	30				
	Exhausted votes					5	10	54
Quota: 158

== Aftermath ==
Three of the five councillors elected said they supported the work of Norfolk Island People for Democracy, which supports political self-determination for the territory. Former Chief Minister David Buffett was among the unsuccessful candidates at the election.

On 4 February 2021, Assistant Minister for Regional Development and Territories Nola Marino suspended the council and appointed Mike Colreavy as an Interim Administrator, following the postponement of the 2020 election. On 6 December 2021, the council was formally dismissed and Colreavy became Administrator for a period of three years, with the next election scheduled to be held in 2024.
