= 2007 Norfolk Island legislative election =

- 21 March 2007

All 9 seats on the Legislative Assembly
- Registered: 1,237
- Turnout: 93.21%
	First party	Second party
	IND
Leader	N/A	Ian Anderson
Party	Independents	Liberal
Last election	9 seats	–
Seats won	8	1
Seat change	▼1	New
Popular vote	9,058	662
Percentage	93.19%	6.81%
Swing	▼6.81pp	New
Chief Minister before election
David Buffett
Independent
Resulting Chief Minister
Andre Nobbs
Independent

The 2007 Norfolk Island legislative election was held on 21 March 2007 to elect the 12th Norfolk Island Legislative Assembly, the prime legislative body of Norfolk Island.

This was the first election to use a modified electoral system, which had been introduced by the Assembly in 2005. Electors each have nine equal votes, which can be divided in any way between candidates, but no more than two votes could be given to any particular individual candidate. Previously, electors were able to give a single candidate up to four votes. This variation of cumulative voting is called "weighted first past the post".

Incumbent Chief Minister David Buffett, who had served in every Assembly since it was formed in 1979, lost his seat at the election. As a result, Andre Nobbs replaced him in the position on 28 March.

== Results ==
1,036 votes (89.85%) were cast in-person inside Rawson Hall, with an additional 117 absentee votes (10.15%).

Party	Candidate	Votes	%	±%
Independent	Andre Nobbs (elected)	1,261	12.97	
Independent	Christopher Magri (elected)	1,227	12.62	
Independent	Brendon Christian (elected)	1,151	11.84	
Independent	Stephanie Jack (elected)	807	8.30	
Independent	Neville Christian (elected)	711	7.31	
Liberal	Ian Anderson (elected)	662	6.81	
Independent	Lisle Snell (elected)	650	6.69	
Independent	Geoffrey Gardner (elected)	625	6.43	
Independent	Timothy Sheridan (elected)	617	6.35	
Independent	Ronald Nobbs	441	4.54	
Independent	David Buffett	355	3.65	
Independent	Maureen King	315	3.24	
Independent	John Brown	234	2.41	
Independent	Terence Jope	205	2.11	
Independent	Lorraine Boudan	189	1.94	
Independent	Timothy Brown	161	1.66	
Independent	Frederick Howe	109	1.12	
Total formal votes		9,720	100.0	
Total formal ballots		1,080	93.67	
Informal votes		73	6.44	
Turnout		1,153	93.21	
