= 1979 Norfolk Island legislative election =

← 1972	10 August 1979	1983 →
	First party
	IND
Leader	N/A
Party	Independents
Last election	9 seats
Seats won	9
Seat change	▲1
Resulting Chief Minister
David Buffett
Independent

The 1979 Norfolk Island legislative election was held on 10 August 1979 to elect the 1st Norfolk Island Legislative Assembly, the prime legislative body of Norfolk Island.

This was the first election for the Assembly − which replaced the Norfolk Island Council − after Norfolk Island returned to self-governance. Voters were asked in a referendum prior to the election whether to introduce the proportional representation electoral system, with the proposal unsuccessful.

== Results ==
Nine members were elected, up from the eight members that the council had.

Following the election, David Buffett became the first Chief Minister of Norfolk Island.
