= 2020 Norfolk Island local election =

Cancelled election in Norfolk

- 14 November 2020 (cancelled)

All 5 seats on the Regional Council

The 2020 Norfolk Island local election was scheduled to be held on 14 November 2020 to elect the Norfolk Island Regional Council, the local government body of Norfolk Island. It was later postponed until March 2021, however the council was suspended in February 2021 and eventually dismissed later that year.

The election was to have been conducted by the Australian Election Company.

== Background ==
Following the disbandment of the Norfolk Island Legislative Assembly in 2015, elections were held in line with the local government elections in the state of New South Wales. As such, the postponment of the 2020 New South Wales local elections also affected Norfolk Island.

The election was then scheduled to be held in March 2021. However, on 4 February 2021, Assistant Minister for Regional Development and Territories Nola Marino suspended the council and appointed Mike Colreavy as an Interim Administrator. On 6 December 2021, the council was formally dismissed and Colreavy became Administrator for a period of three years, with the next election scheduled to be held in 2024.

Prior to its cancellation, candidates (including incumbent councillors) had already declared their intention to contest the election, including the only Norfolk Liberals councillor, Dave Porter.
