= 2024 Norfolk Island local election =

Election in Norfolk Island

- 14 September 2024

All 5 seats on the Regional Council (council suspended) 3 seats needed for a majority
	IND
Leader	N/A	Dave Porter
Party	Independents	Liberal
Last election	4 seats, 84.39%	1 seat, 15.61%
Current seats	4	1
Seats needed	Steady	▲2
Incumbent Administrator
Mike Colreavy

The 2024 Norfolk Island local election was scheduled to be held on 14 September 2024 to elect the Norfolk Island Regional Council, the local government body of Norfolk Island. However, no election took place following the suspension of the council in 2020 after years of financial troubles.

On 4 February 2021, then-Assistant Minister for Regional Development and Territories Nola Marino suspended the council and appointed Mike Colreavy as an Interim Administrator, following the postponement of the 2020 election. On 6 December 2021, the council was formally dismissed and Colreavy became Administrator for a period of three years.

At the most recent council election in 2016, five councillors were elected − four independents and one member of the Norfolk Liberals.
