= List of speakers of the Norfolk Legislative Assembly =

The Speaker of the Norfolk Legislative Assembly was the presiding officer of the Norfolk Island Legislative Assembly.

In absence of the Speaker, the speaker pro tempore or deputy speaker, was designated to fill in.

== List of speakers ==
This is a list of presidents (from 1995: speakers) of the Norfolk Island Legislative Assembly) until the abolition of the assembly in 2015:

Name	Entered office	Left office
Hon. David Ernest Buffett	?	?
Hon. John Terence Brown	21 May 1986	22 May 1989
Hon. David Ernest Buffett	22 May 1989	20 May 1992
Hon. John Terence Brown	20 May 1992	4 May 1994
Hon. David Ernest Buffett	4 May 1994	1997
Hon. George Charles Smith	5 May 1997	2000
Hon. David Ernest Buffett	28 February 2000	2006
Hon. Geoffrey Robert Gardner	1 February 2006	27 March 2007
Hon. Lisle Denis Snell	28 March 2007	24 March 2010
Hon. Robin Adams	24 March 2010	20 March 2013
Hon. David Ernest Buffett	20 March 2013	17 June 2015
