= 2001 Norfolk Island legislative election =

Election in Norfolk

- 29 November 2001

All 9 seats on the Legislative Assembly
	First party
	IND
Leader	N/A
Party	Independents
Last election	9 seats
Seats won	9
Seat change	Steady
Chief Minister before election
Ronald Nobbs
Independent
Resulting Chief Minister
Geoff Gardner
Independent

The 2001 Norfolk Island legislative election was held on 29 November 2001 to elect the 10th Norfolk Island Legislative Assembly, the prime legislative body of Norfolk Island.

The election, which was initially scheduled for 2003, was called early instead following the results of the early election referendum.

Following the elections, Geoff Gardner replaced Ronald Nobbs as Chief Minister on 5 December.

== Results ==
Party	Candidate	Votes	%	±%
Independent	Geoff Gardner (elected)	930	10.06	
Independent	David Buffett (elected)	859	9.29	
Independent	Ivens Buffett (elected)	712	7.70	
Independent	George Smith (elected)	656	7.10	
Independent	Graeme Donaldson (elected)	646	6.99	
Independent	Stephanie Jack (elected)	546	5.91	
Independent	Chloe Nicholas (elected)	519	5.62	
Independent	John Brown (elected)	504	5.45	
Independent	Ronald Nobbs (elected)	491	5.31	
Independent	Neville Christian	488	5.28	
Independent	Adrian Cook	480	5.19	
Independent	Colleen Evans	435	4.71	
Independent	Bruce Walker	351	3.80	
Independent	Alan McCoy	311	3.36	
Independent	Brian Bates	309	33.4	
Independent	William Sanders	305	3.30	
Independent	Michael Perkins	261	2.82	
Independent	Nadia Cuthbertson	261	2.82	
Independent	Graeme Woolley	179	1.94	
Total formal votes		9,243	100.0	
