= 2015 Norfolk Island status referendum =

- 8 May 2015
- Should the people of Norfolk Island have the right to freely determine their political status, their economic, social and cultural development and be consulted at referendum or plebiscite on the future model of governance for Norfolk Island before such changes are acted on by the Australian Parliament?

Results
Choice	Votes	%
Yes	624	70.11%
No	266	29.89%
Valid votes	890	97.59%
Invalid or blank votes	22	2.41%
Total votes	912	100.00%

A referendum was held in Norfolk Island on 8 May 2015, asking residents if they should have a say in determining the island's political status. The referendum was successful, although the result was non-binding.

The vote was initiated by the Norfolk Island Legislative Assembly after it was announced on 19 March 2015 that self-governance for the island would be revoked by the Commonwealth and replaced by a local council, with the state of New South Wales providing services to the island.

Both the Norfolk Island Labor Party and Norfolk Liberals supported a "no" vote.

== Results ==
The result was a clear "Yes", with 70% of voters saying Norfolk Islanders should have the right to determine their political status.

Norfolk Island Chief Minister Lisle Snell said that "the referendum results blow a hole in Canberra's assertion that the reforms introduced before the Australian Parliament that propose abolishing the Legislative Assembly and Norfolk Island Parliament were overwhelmingly supported by the people of Norfolk Island".

2015 Norfolk Island status referendum
Choice	Votes	%
For	624	70.11
Against	266	29.89
Total	890	100.00
Valid votes	890	97.59
Invalid/blank votes	22	2.41
Total votes	912	100.00

== See also ==
- 1991 Norfolk Island status referendum
