= 1979 Norfolk Island electoral system referendum =

10 July 1979

Results
Choice	Votes	%
Yes	339	42.27%
No	463	57.73%
Valid votes	802	99.63%
Invalid or blank votes	3	0.37%
Total votes	805	100.00%

An electoral system referendum was held in Norfolk Island on 10 July 1979 on the introduction of proportional representation for the Norfolk Island Legislative Assembly.

The referendum was held before the first election for the Assembly, which replaced the Norfolk Island Council.

Voters were asked "Should the method of election of members of the Legislative Assembly of Norfolk Island be by the system of Proportional Representation used in the Legislative Assembly election of August 1979 instead of by the system used in the election of members of the ninth Norfolk Island Council?". The referendum was unsuccessful, with more than 57% of voters against the proposal.

== See also ==
- 1982 Norfolk Island voter eligibility referendum
