= 1982 Norfolk Island electoral system referendum =

1 December 1982

Results
Choice	Votes	%
Yes	535	63.92%
No	302	36.08%
Valid votes	837	99.29%
Invalid or blank votes	6	0.71%
Total votes	843	100.00%

A referendum was held in Norfolk Island on 1 December 1982 to decide whether the electoral system for the Norfolk Island Legislative Assembly should be changed from proportional representation to a new cumulative voting system.

Voters were asked "Are you in favor of a change from proportional representation type of system of voting to a new cumulative system of voting?", with a threshold of 60% votes in favor required for passage. The referendum passed narrowly, with just over 63% of voters in favor of the change.

== See also ==
- 1979 Norfolk Island electoral system referendum
