= Australian Election Company =

Private local election service

- Founded: c. 2011
- Founder: Richard Kidd

The Australian Election Company (AEC), also referred to as AustElect, is a private company which conducts elections in Australia, chiefly at the local government level. The company has never conducted an election at a state or federal level, which are administered by state electoral commissions and the Australian Electoral Commission, respectively.

== History ==
The company was founded ahead of the 2012 New South Wales local elections, and conducted the elections for multiple councils instead of the New South Wales Electoral Commission. Despite a staff recommendation, Port Macquarie-Hastings Council opted not to use the company, partly because it had not conducted any elections in New South Wales before.

The first election for Norfolk Island Regional Council in 2016 was conducted by the company, as was the election for the City of Maitland the following year. The cancelled 2020 Norfolk Island local election was also scheduled to be held by the company.

At the 2021 New South Wales local elections, both Fairfield City Council and Penrith City Council used the company's services.
