= Dave Porter (Norfolk Islander politician) =

Norfolk Islander politician

Cr Dave Porter

Member of the Norfolk Island Regional Council
- In office 28 May 2016 – 6 December 2021

Member of the Norfolk Island Legislative Assembly
- In office 13 March 2013 – 17 June 2015

Personal details
- Born: 2 October 1954 (age 71)
- Party: Liberal

David Raymond Porter (born 2 October 1954) is a Norfolk Islander politician. He was a member of the Norfolk Island Regional Council before it was dismissed in 2021, and prior to that, a member of the Norfolk Island Legislative Assembly before it was disbanded. He is a senior member of the Norfolk Liberals.

== Political career ==
Porter was elected to the Legislative Assembly at the 2013 election, running alongside Ian Anderson as Liberal candidates.

Following the disbandment of the Legislative Assembly, Porter ran in the inaugural Regional Council election in 2016. He was successful, being the third of five candidates declared elected having received 15.61% of the vote.

Porter intended to run for re-election in 2020, however the election was postponed and later cancelled.
