= Ivens Buffett =

Ivens Buffett MLA

Deputy Chief Minister of Norfolk Island
- In office unknown – 19 July 2004

Lands Minister of Norfolk Island
- In office unknown – 19 July 2004

Member of the Norfolk Island Legislative Assembly
- In office unknown – 19 July 2004

Personal details
- Born: Ivens François Buffett
- Died: 19 July 2004 Norfolk Island, Australia
- Party: Independent

Ivens François "Toon" Buffett (died 19 July 2004) was a political figure from the Australian External Territory of Norfolk Island. He was the first sitting minister of an Australian government to be assassinated.

Before his death, Buffett was serving as Lands Minister and Deputy Chief Minister of Norfolk Island. He had previously served one term as Chief Executive.

== Murder ==
On 19 July 2004, Buffett was shot dead in his office with his own Lee-Enfield .303 rifle.

Buffett's 25-year-old son, Leith, was charged with the murder of his father. Legal proceedings then found that Leith was incompetent to stand trial, because of severe mental illness. Leith has been described as believing that his father was "The Evil Prophet".

Due to the inadequacy of jail cells and hospice facilities on the island, Leith Buffett was transferred to Sydney, first to Long Bay Prison's hospital, a matter which required an amendment to the Crimes Act 1999 in New South Wales.

Police stressed that the Buffett case was unrelated to the 2002 death of Janelle Patton who, until Buffett's death, had been the only person in the island's recent history to be murdered there.
