= List of state and territory branches of the Australian Labor Party =

Australian Labor Party
- Membership (2018): ▲50,000
- International affiliation: Progressive Alliance
- Colours: Red

Website
- www.alp.org.au

The Australian Labor Party is an Australian political party. It is organised into a national organisation as well as a branch in each state and territory, as follows:

- Australian Labor Party (New South Wales Branch)
- Australian Labor Party (Victorian Branch)
- Australian Labor Party (Queensland Branch)
- Australian Labor Party (Western Australian Branch)
- Australian Labor Party (South Australian Branch)
- Australian Labor Party (Tasmanian Branch)
- Australian Labor Party (Australian Capital Territory Branch)
- Australian Labor Party (Northern Territory Branch)

== See also ==
- Norfolk Island Labor Party
