= Coat of arms of Norfolk Island =

- Armiger: Territory of Norfolk Island
- Adopted: 20 October 1980
- Crest: Out of a Naval Crown Azure a demi-lion Or gorged with a laurel wreath proper and holding a covered cup Or
- Torse: Argent and Azure
- Shield: Per chevron Azure and Argent in chief two Mullets of the last and in base issuant from a Rocky Mount charged with a Book expanded proper edged Or leathered Gules a Norfolk Island pine proper
- Supporters: On the dexter side a Lion and on the sinister side a Kangaroo proper each resting the exterior foreleg on an Anchor erect Azure
- Motto: Inasmuch

The coat of arms of Norfolk Island is an official symbol of the island and external Australian territory of Norfolk Island. It was granted by a Royal Warrant of Queen Elizabeth II on 20 October 1980.

The motto INASMUCH comes from the song Come Ye Blessed, the island's anthem.

== See also ==
- Flag of Norfolk Island
- Australian heraldry
