= 1991 Norfolk Island status referendum =

2 January 1991
- With respect to matters discussed by the Legal Regimes Inquiry, including the question of federal representation, should the constitutional position of Norfolk Island be changed?

Results
Choice	Votes	%
Yes	162	17.05%
No	788	82.95%
Valid votes	950	99.16%
Invalid or blank votes	8	0.84%
Total votes	958	100.00%

A status referendum was held in Norfolk Island on 2 January 1991 on the constitutional status of the Australian external territory of Norfolk Island.

Voters were asked "With respect to matters discussed by the Legal Regimes Inquiry, including the question of federal representation, should the constitutional position of Norfolk Island be changed?".

The referendum was dismissed by the Australian Government as premature, because the federal parliament had not yet decided anything.

== See also ==
- 2015 Norfolk Island status referendum
