= Mike King (politician) =

Norfolk Islander politician

Mike King MLA

Head of Government of Norfolk Island
- In office 4 May 1994 – 5 May 1997
- Preceded by: John Brown
- Succeeded by: George Smith

Leader of the Opposition of Norfolk Island
- In office unknown – 13 March 2013

Leader of the Norfolk Island Labor Party
- In office unknown–unknown

Member of the Norfolk Island Legislative Assembly
- In office unknown – 13 March 2013

Personal details
- Party: Labor

Michael William King is a former politician who served as Head of Government of the Australian territory of Norfolk Island from 1994 until 1997.

King became Head of Government following the 1994 election, serving in the role until the end of the Assembly's three-year term in 1997. He also led the Norfolk Island Labor Party, serving as Opposition Leader at different stages, although the party appears to have faded away sometime after 2015.

King did not seek re-election in 2013, and Norfolk Labor appears to have faded away sometime after 2015.
