= 2001 Norfolk Island early election referendum =

24 October 2001
- Should a new election be held for the full membership of the Legislative Assembly at the earliest convenient date?

Results
Choice	Votes	%
Yes	555	59.42%
No	379	40.58%
Valid votes	934	98.84%
Invalid or blank votes	11	1.16%
Total votes	945	100.00%

A referendum on holding early elections to the Legislative Assembly was held in Norfolk Island on 24 October 2001. The citizen-initiated vote proposed bringing forwards the elections scheduled for 2003.

Voters were asked "Should a new election be held for the full membership of the Legislative Assembly at the earliest convenient date?". The proposal was approved by slightly less than 60% of voters, leading to an election on 29 November 2001.
