= Andre Nobbs =

Prime Minister of Norfolk Island

Andre Neville Nobbs is a political figure from the Australian territory of Norfolk Island. He was elected to the Norfolk Island Legislative Assembly in 2007 to become the Chief Minister and re-elected in 2010 as Minister for Tourism, Industry and Development.

== Chief Minister of Norfolk Island ==
He was the Chief Minister of Norfolk Island, serving from 28 March 2007, until 24 March 2010. He both succeeded and was succeeded by David Buffett.

== See also ==
- Politics of Norfolk Island
