= Flag of Norfolk Island =

Norfolk Island
- Use: Civil and state flag
- Proportion: 1:2
- Adopted: 9 June 1979; 47 years ago
- Design: Norfolk Island pine (Araucaria heterophylla) in a central white stripe between two green stripes. The three bands are in the proportions 7:9:7.

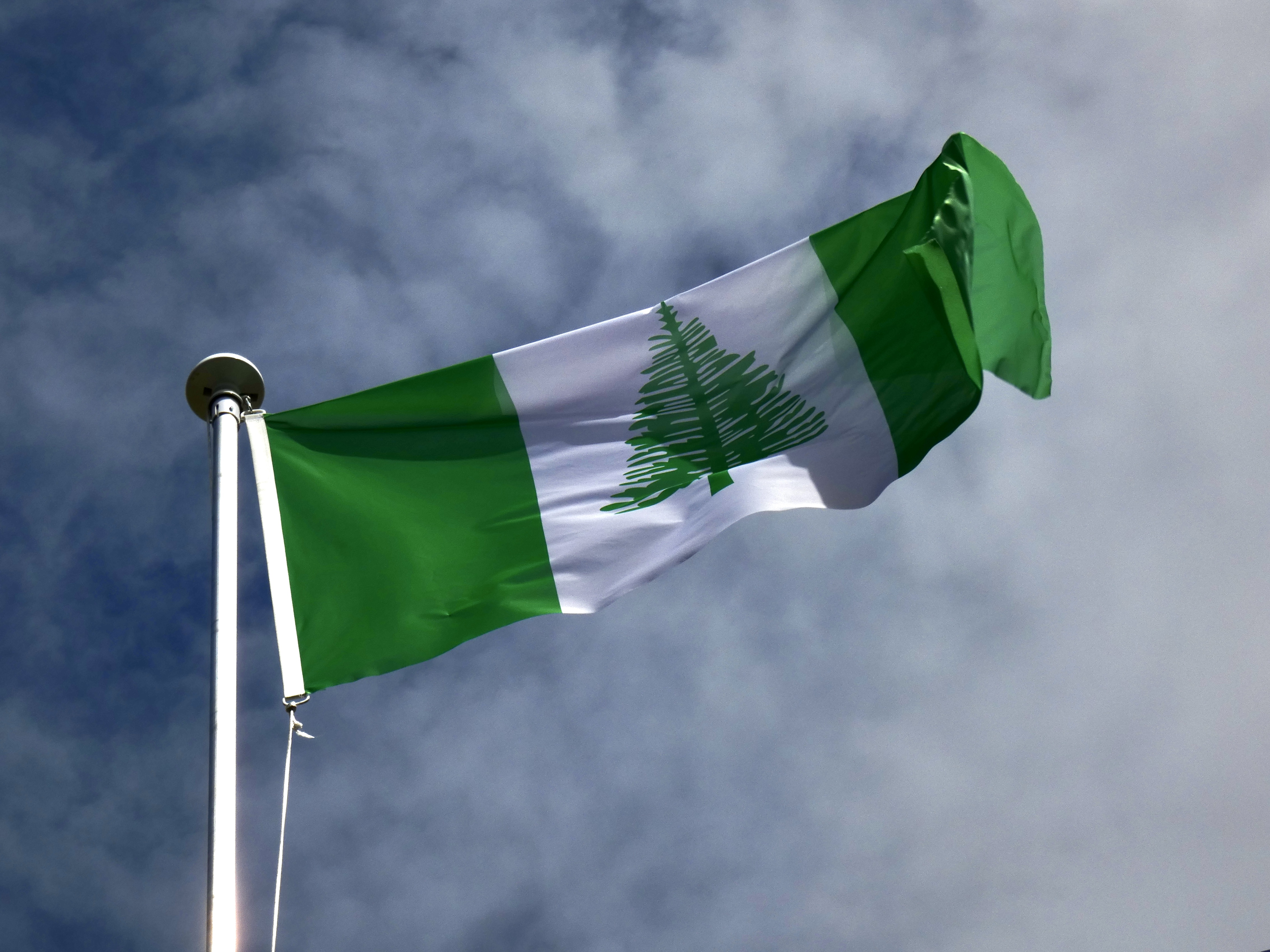
Flag of Norfolk Island at the Commonwealth Games, Birmingham, 2022

The flag of Norfolk Island is a triband consisting of green, white, and green bands charged with a green Norfolk Island pine in the centre. Adopted in 1979 when the islands gained limited self-government, it has been the flag of the Territory of Norfolk Island since 6 June of that year. The pine is native to the territory and is its official tree.

== History ==
Norfolk Island was first sighted by James Cook in 1774 during his second voyage to the southern Pacific Ocean. Settlers moved to the island in March 1788, when it was claimed by the colony of New South Wales. Cook surmised that the Norfolk Island pine (Araucaria heterophylla) could be utilised for the masts of ships, but his prediction ultimately did not come to fruition.

The island was initially employed as a penal colony until 1814, and again from 1825 to 1855. It was then used in 1856 to relocate people from the Pitcairn Islands, which had become overpopulated, and Norfolk Island was consequently designated "a distinct and separate settlement" from mainland Australia on 24 June of the same year. It later lost its self-governing status in 1897, when the British placed the territory under the administration of the Governor of New South Wales. The island joined the now-independent Commonwealth of Australia as a territory under the Norfolk Island Act 1913. However, its exact constitutional relationship with the rest of the commonwealth was not enunciated at the time.

A royal commission was established in 1975 to resolve Norfolk Island's constitutional status. Four years later, the territory was granted its own legislative assembly, but remained unrepresented in the Federal Parliament. The bill that became the Norfolk Island Flag and Public Seal Act 1979 was introduced to the Australian Parliament that same year and received royal assent on 17 January 1980.

== Design ==
=== Description ===
The flag of Norfolk Island is described in detail in Norfolk Island Flag and Public Seal Act 1979, federal legislation that has been in force from 17 January 1980. It specifies the flag is to have an aspect ratio of 1:2. The act specifies Pantone Matching System 356 for the green of the flag, without giving any further detail on the white.

Norfolk Island flag colour
Colour	Pantone	converted to RGB	Hex form
Green	356	0-120-51	#007833
White	Not specified		

=== Symbolism ===
The colours and symbols of the flag carry cultural, political, and regional meanings. The green symbolises Norfolk Island's plentiful vegetation and fertile land. The Norfolk Island pine is native to the islands, and is the official tree of the territory.

=== Similarities ===
Norfolk Island's flag is analogous to the flag of Nigeria, which utilises a triband of green and white in a similar fashion. Norfolk Island's flag is also similar to the Pine Tree Flag, used during the American Revolution.
