= Cuisine of Norfolk Island =

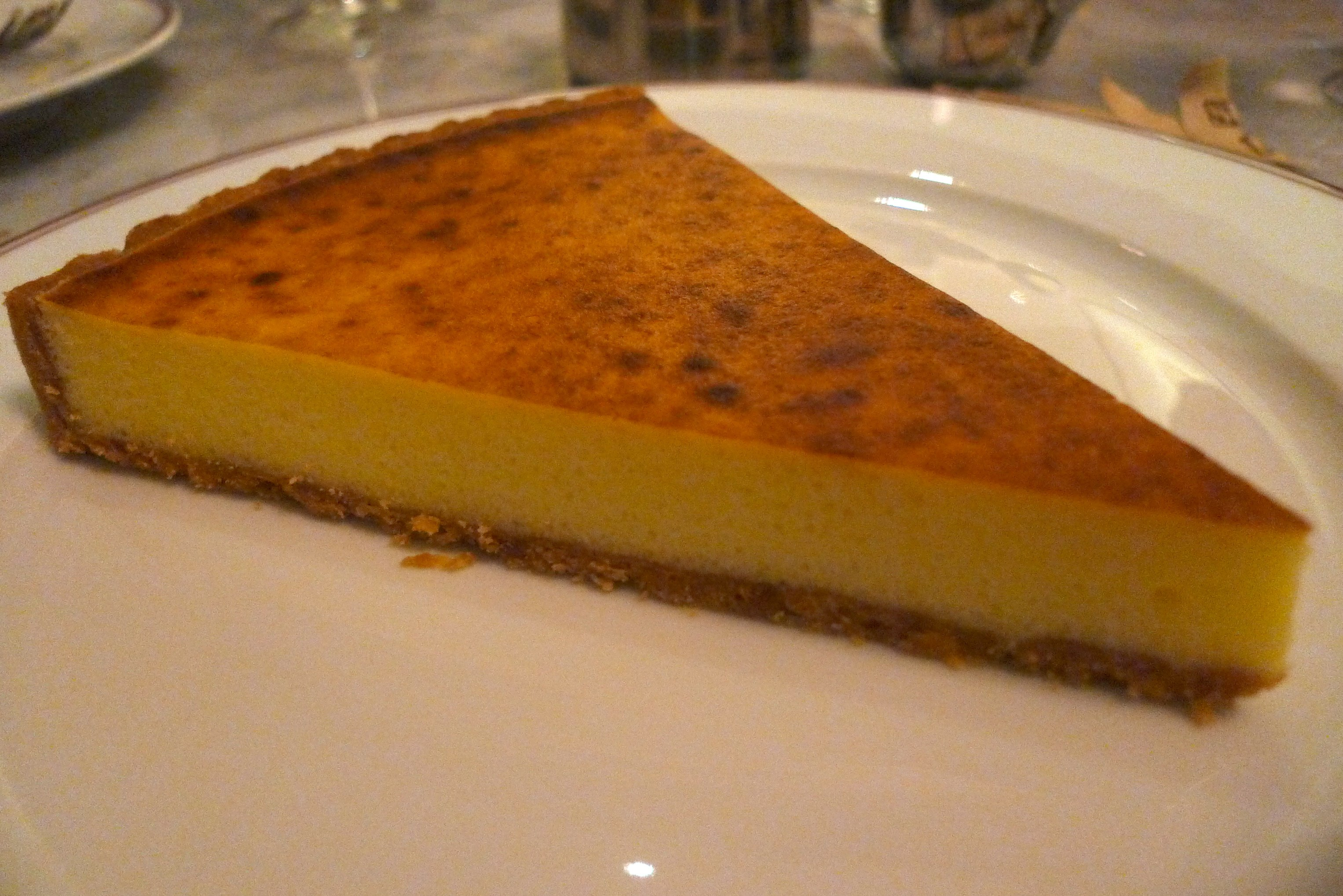
Lemon pie, a dish eaten on Norfolk Island

The Cuisine of Norfolk Island is based primarily on Pitcairn Islands cuisine, a mixture of British cuisine and Tahitian cuisine, as the majority of the islands’ inhabitants are descendants of Pitcairn Islanders who relocated to Norfolk Island due to overcrowding on the Pitcairn Islands. It also has influences from American cuisine and Australian cuisine.

Many of the typical dishes on Norfolk Island that originate from the Pitcairn Islands include raw fish, green banana dumplings known locally as mudda and a pudding made from sweet potato called pilhi. On special occasions, meals are cooked underground in an Earth oven, known as a dot awen (dirt oven), a method of cooking that was inherited from the Tahitians.

American whalers would have a significant influence on the island's cuisine, introducing American style dessert pies that would become part of the islanders repertoire and events like Thanksgiving and the Fish fry would be celebrated.

== See also ==
- Australian cuisine
