= Robin Adams (politician) =

Norfolk Island politician

Mayor of Norfolk Island
- In office 2016–2021
- Preceded by: Lisle Snell (Chief Minister)
- Succeeded by: Mike Colveary (interim administrator)

Speaker of the Norfolk Island Legislative Assembly
- In office 24 March 2010 – 20 March 2013
- Preceded by: Lisle Snell
- Succeeded by: David Buffett

Personal details
- Born: Sydney, New South Wales, Australia
- Party: Independent

Robin Eleanor Adams is a Norfolk Islander politician. Adams was elected to the Norfolk Island Legislative Assembly in 2010, becoming the body's first female speaker. When the assembly was dissolved five years later, she became a member of the Norfolk Island Regional Council and was elected as mayor of the island, a position she held until the entire council was dismissed in 2021.

== Early life and education ==
Robin Eleanor Adams was born and raised in Sydney, Australia, to a Norfolk Islander family of Pitcairn descent.

After being educated in Sydney, she worked as a teacher there. Then, in 1966, she married a Norfolk Islander and moved to the island, returning to her roots.

== Career ==
Adams entered the public service on Norfolk Island. Beginning in 1981, she worked as deputy clerk of the Legislative Assembly of Norfolk Island. Then, in 1984, she became the assembly's clerk, a position she held until 2010.

In March 2010, Adams was elected to the Legislative Assembly of Norfolk Island. One week later, she was chosen as speaker of the assembly, becoming its first female speaker. Adams remained on the assembly until Norfolk Island lost its local administration in 2015–2016; she had been serving as culture minister and acting chief minister at the time.

After the change in governing structure, Adams joined the Norfolk Island Regional Council and was subsequently elected mayor on 6 July 2016. She served as mayor until 2021, when Adams and the rest of the Norfolk Island Regional Council were dismissed by the Australian government and replaced with an administrator, Michael Colreavy, for a three-year term in anticipation of elections in 2024.
