= Norfolk Island Council =

Type
- Type: Unicameral

History
- Disbanded: 1979
- Succeeded by: Norfolk Island Legislative Assembly
- Seats: 8

The Norfolk Island Council was the prime legislative body of Norfolk Island until it was abolished in 1979. It had eight members and was replaced with the Norfolk Island Legislative Assembly following the return of self-government.

The council was advisory-only, and chaired by the Administrator of Norfolk Island.
