= Cabinet of Norfolk Island =

Cabinet of Norfolk Island was the council of ministers responsible to the Norfolk Island Legislative Assembly.

The Cabinet had four ministers:

- Chief Minister of Norfolk Island - also responsible for Tourism
- Minister for Cultural Heritage and Community Services - also responsible for Healthcare, Employment & Workers Compensation
- Minister for Environment
- Minister for Finance - also responsible for Norfolk Island Immigration Department, Telecom services

All other government departments reported to the Government as a whole.

The Australian Government abolished the Norfolk Island Government in 2015.
