= Geoff Gardner =

Australian politician

Geoffrey Robert Gardner (born 1961) is a political figure from the Australian territory of Norfolk Island.

== Norfolk Island ==
Gardner was the chief minister of Norfolk Island from 5 December 2001 to 2 June 2006. He was succeeded in that post by David Buffett. Gardner was appointed Speaker of the Norfolk Island Legislative Assembly in 2006, serving until 2007.

== Athletics ==
Gardner is the vice-president of the World Athletics, formerly the International Association of Athletics Federations and up until September 2019 was the president of Oceania Athletics since 2007.

== See also ==
- Politics of Norfolk Island
