= Neville Christian =

Norfolk Island politician

Hon. Neville Christian MLA
- Occupations: Minister for Finance, Norfolk Island Government

Neville Charles Christian is a Norfolk Island politician, and was Minister for Finance in the Twelfth Norfolk Island Legislative Assembly which took office on 28 March 2007.

He held responsibilities for Public Monies, Government Business Enterprises, Airlines (Norfolk Air), Customs & Emergency Management.
