= Politics of Norfolk Island =

Politics of Norfolk Island takes place in the framework of the Norfolk Island Act 1979, an act of the Parliament of Australia which governs the status of Norfolk Island as an external territory of Australia.

The administrator of Norfolk Island is appointed by the federal government and administered through a federal government department (the Department of Infrastructure, Transport, Regional Development, Communications and the Arts since 2022). Norfolk Island historically enjoyed a significant level of self-government, with the Norfolk Island Legislative Assembly serving as its independent legislature from 1979 to 2015 and electing a chief minister. The Legislative Assembly was replaced by the Norfolk Island Regional Council in 2016. The regional council operates under the local government legislation of the state of New South Wales, although Norfolk Island remains a federal territory.

Residents of Norfolk Island are eligible to vote in federal elections, with their votes counting towards election of senators for the Australian Capital Territory (ACT) and the ACT-based Division of Bean in the House of Representatives.

== Political parties ==
The Australian Labor Party (ALP) has been active on Norfolk Island for a number of years, and as of 2023 operated as a sub-branch of ACT Labor. At the 2010 Norfolk Island legislative election, Labor ran four candidates, receiving 13.59% of the total vote. Mike King, a member of the party, served as leader of the opposition in the Legislative Assembly. However, King did not recontest the 2013 election.

As of 2022, a "Norfolk Island Interest Branch" operated within the Canberra Liberals.

At the 2015 status referendum, the local branches of both the ALP and Liberal Party supported the "no" vote, which was ultimately unsuccessful.

== Executive branch ==
The Norfolk Island Legislative Assembly was abolished on 1 July 2015 and replaced with the Australian Government maintaining authority on the island through an Administrator (currently Fiona McKergow) who is appointed by the Governor-General of Australia. Two of the members of the Assembly would form the Executive Council, which devises policy and acts as an advisory body to the Administrator. This council would be headed by the Administrator of Norfolk Island.

== Relationship with Australia ==
Controversy exists as to the exact status of Norfolk Island. Despite the island's status as a self-governing territory of Australia, some Islanders claim that it was actually granted independence at the time Queen Victoria granted permission to Pitcairn Islanders to re-settle on the island. These views have been repeatedly rejected by the Australian parliament's joint committee on territories, most recently in 2004, and were also rejected by the High Court of Australia in Berwick Ltd v Gray.

Disagreements over the island's relationship with Australia were put in sharper relief by a 2006 review undertaken by the Australian government. Under the more radical of two proposed models proposed as a result of the review, the island's legislative assembly would be reduced to the status of a local council.

In a move that apparently surprised many islanders, the Chief Minister of Norfolk Island David Buffett announced on 6 November 2010 that the island would voluntarily surrender its tax free status in return for a financial bailout from the federal government to cover significant debts.

It was announced on 19 March 2015 that self-governance for the island would be revoked by the Commonwealth and replaced by a local council with the state of New South Wales providing services to the island. A reason given was that the island had never gained self-sufficiency and was being heavily subsidised by the Commonwealth, by $12.5 million in 2015 alone. It meant residents would have to start paying Australian income tax, but they would also be covered by Australian welfare schemes such as Medicare.

The Norfolk Island Legislative Assembly decided to hold a referendum on the proposal in 2015. Voters were asked if Norfolk Islanders should freely determine their political status, their economic, social and cultural development, and to "be consulted at referendum or plebiscite on the future model of governance for Norfolk Island before such changes are acted upon by the Australian parliament." The outcome of the referendum was a 68% 'Yes' vote. The Norfolk Island Chief Minister said that "the referendum results blow a hole in Canberra's assertion that the reforms introduced before the Australian Parliament that propose abolishing the Legislative Assembly and Norfolk Island Parliament were overwhelmingly supported by the people of Norfolk Island".

The Norfolk Island Legislation Amendment Bill 2015 passed the Australian Parliament on 14 May 2015 (Assented on 26 May 2015) abolishing self-government on Norfolk Island and transferring Norfolk Island into a council as part of New South Wales law. From 1 July 2016 Norfolk Island legislation was transferred to New South Wales and subject to NSW legislation. From 1 July 2016, the Norfolk Island Regional Council was established to govern Norfolk Island at the local level as a local government area subject to the laws of New South Wales.

=== Changes from July 2016 ===
Residents of Norfolk Island who are citizens of Australia and meet the normal enrolment requirements are required to enrol to vote in Australian federal and once enrolled must vote. 393 people voted at the polling booths on Norfolk Island for the Canberra electorate at the 2016 Federal election, with 16.5% of votes being informal. 777 Norfolk Island residents were on the Commonwealth electoral roll as of 1 April 2019, and 669 people voted at the booths on Norfolk Island in the 2019 Federal election in the newly created Bean electorate, with 17.8% of votes being informal.

The election for the inaugural Norfolk Island Regional Council occurred on 28 May 2016, with the new council taking office on 1 July 2016. Three of the five councilors elected supported self-determination.

From 1 July 2016, Norfolk Island residents came under Australian levies, personal or business income and corporation taxation by the Australian Taxation Office. Also both Centrelink and Medicare will apply to Norfolk Island. In addition, flights between mainland Australia and Norfolk Island became classified as domestic not international meaning a passport was no longer required by visiting Australian citizens. Despite New South Wales laws being applied on Norfolk Island, residents are not eligible to vote in New South Wales elections.

=== State-based services switch to Queensland from 2022 ===
Since 1 January 2022, Queensland has provided state-based services directly for Norfolk Island, taking over from New South Wales.

=== Independence ===
Some residents on Norfolk Island advocate independence from Australia. In 2013, Chief Minister Lisle Snell claimed that Norfolk Island could survive alone. He also told Radio Australia that 'Norfolk-Pitcairn people see themselves as a people with some rights to self-determination' that the Island's future relationship with Australia was not clear, but also stated that for the time being they need to integrate further with Australia for financial reasons.

== Foreign relations ==
As a territory of Australia, Norfolk Island does not have diplomatic representation abroad or within the territory. It is however a full participant in the Commonwealth Parliamentary Association (an international organisation) and a member in its own right of a number of international sporting organisations (e.g. the Commonwealth Games).

== See also ==
- Politics of Australia
