= Norfolk Island Regional Council =

- Local government area
- Interactive map of Norfolk Island Regional Council
- Coordinates: 29°01′48″S 167°57′37″E
- Country: Australia
- State: Australia
- Established: 1 July 2016
- Council seat: Burnt Pine

Government
  - Administrator: Scott Mason

Population
  - Total: 2,188 (2021 census)
- Website: Norfolk Island Regional Council

The Norfolk Island Regional Council is the local government body of Norfolk Island, an island territory of Australia in the south Pacific Ocean. It is subject to the state-level legislation of Queensland.

== History ==
Prior to July 2015, Norfolk Island was self-governed by the Norfolk Island Legislative Assembly. In 2015, the Parliament of Australia voted to abolish Norfolk Island's autonomy and integrate it with Australia as a part of the state of New South Wales, over local opposition. The Norfolk Island Regional Council was created to replace the dissolved Legislative Assembly. The Norfolk Island Regional Council was formally established on 1 July 2016 and, unlike most local government bodies in Australia, delivers many Commonwealth services to residents in addition to local-level services such as land planning and emergency management.

In December 2021, the elected council was dismissed and an administrator, Michael Colreavy was appointed.

On 13 November 2024, the Federal Minister for Regional Development, local Government and Territories, Kristy McBain, announced a new governance model for the island – the Norfolk Island Assembly – and the extension of the administration period under a new administration team replacing Colreavy. The Minister appointed a Lead Administrator, Scott Mason, and a Financial Administrator, Gary Mottau, who both commenced on 6 December 2024.

In 2021, state jurisdiction over the Norfolk Island Regional Council was switched from New South Wales to Queensland as a result of a government funding decision. In 2025, the Australian government announced plans to abolish the Norfolk Island Legislative Council and replace it with a new Norfolk Island Legislative Assembly, despite campaigns for resumption of autonomy. The Council was extended until 31 December 2026 by the Australian government whilst the new Assembly was set up.

== Election results ==
=== 2016 ===
Party	Candidate	Votes	%	±%
Quota		158		
Independent	Rod Buffett (elected 1)	190	20.17	
Independent	Lisle Snell (elected 2)	149	15.81	
Liberal	Dave Porter (elected 3)	147	15.61	
Independent	Robin Adams (elected 5)	107	11.36	
Independent	John McCoy (elected 4)	97	10.30	
Independent	David Buffett	90	9.55	
Independent	Lyle Tavener	66	7.01	
Independent	Tim Brown	38	4.03	
Independent	Kim Davies	29	3.08	
Independent	Graham White	29	3.08	
Total formal votes		942	100.0	
