= Lisle Snell =

Norfolk Island politician

The Honourable Lisle Snell

Member of Norfolk Island Regional Council
- In office 28 May 2016 – 6 December 2021

Chief Minister of Norfolk Island
- In office 20 March 2013 – 17 June 2015
- Preceded by: David Buffett
- Succeeded by: Office abolished

Personal details
- Born: Norfolk Island

Lisle Denis Snell is an Australian politician who served as Chief Minister of Norfolk Island from 2013 to 2015, and as a member of Norfolk Island Regional Council from 2016 to 2021, before both were dissolved by the Australian government.

== Early life ==
Lisle Snell is of Pitcairn descent. and traced his lineage to Matthew Quintal, a participant of the mutiny on the Bounty. He worked as a tourist guide.

== Career ==
On 24 March 2010, Snell was appointed deputy speaker. He served as chief minister until the island's autonomy was revoked.

In 2013, Snell stated that Norfolk Island could become independent from Australia. In 2015, the Parliament of Australia voted to eliminate Norfolk Island's autonomy, despite lobbying from Snell, and instituted direct control. Snell stated that a referendum should have been held to determine the future of Norfolk Island's autonomy and the Norfolk Island Legislative Assembly passed a resolution supporting that view by a vote of 8 to 1. A non-binding referendum held by the islanders supported maintaining their autonomy. Snell and others opposed to the end of autonomy formed Norfolk Island People for Democracy and an appeal to the United Nations was filed by Geoffrey Robertson.

Snell was one of five people elected to the Norfolk Island Regional Council in 2016. On 16 December 2021, the Australian government suspended the council, which was in the midst of a debt crisis requiring $10 million, for three years. Snell stated that the economy was ruined due to a loss of tourism from the COVID-19 pandemic and that the council was losing $1 million per week.

== Works cited ==
=== News ===
- "Australia Govt suspends Norfolk council". Radio New Zealand. 18 December 2020. Archived from the original on 29 April 2025.
- "Norfolk Islanders face dire straits". The New Zealand Herald. 27 October 2013. Archived from the original on 26 June 2025.
- Cox, Lisa (19 March 2015). "Norfolk Islanders divided over plan to end self-government". The Age. Archived from the original on 27 June 2025.
- Davey, Melissa (26 April 2016). "Norfolk Island leader calls for royal commission into 'Australian takeover'". The Guardian. Archived from the original on 26 June 2025.
- Davey, Melissa (21 May 2015). "'We're not Australian': Norfolk Islanders adjust to shock of takeover by mainland". The Guardian. Archived from the original on 27 June 2025.
- Lawson, Kirsten (11 May 2015). "Norfolk chief minister in last-ditch attempt to save island's self-government". The Age. Archived from the original on 26 June 2025.
- McDonald, Philippa (9 February 2007). "Witness heard screaming, Norfolk Is court told". Australian Broadcasting Corporation. Archived from the original on 27 June 2025.
- Smyth, Jamie (19 March 2015). "Norfolk Islanders plot Australia revolt amid financial crisis". The Age.

=== Web ===
- "Norfolk Island Regional Council Elections". Department of Infrastructure, Transport, Regional Development, Communications, Sport and the Arts. 3 June 2016. Archived from the original on 27 June 2025.
- "Office of the Speaker". Norfolk Island. Archived from the original on 4 November 2013.

Political offices
Preceded by David Buffett	Chief Minister of Norfolk Island; 2013–2015	Office abolished
