= David Buffett =

Norfolk Island politician

The Honourable David Buffett AM MLA

Speaker of the Norfolk Island Legislative Assembly
- In office 20 March 2013 – 17 June 2015
- Succeeded by: Position abolished

Chief Minister of Norfolk Island
- In office 24 March 2010 – 20 March 2013
- Preceded by: Andre Nobbs
- Succeeded by: Lisle Snell
- In office 2 June 2006 – 28 March 2007
- Preceded by: Geoffrey Gardner
- Succeeded by: Andre Nobbs
- In office 10 August 1979 – 21 May 1986
- Preceded by: Office re-established
- Succeeded by: John Brown

President of the Norfolk Island Legislative Assembly
- In office 22 May 1989 – 20 May 1992

Member of the Norfolk Island Legislative Assembly
- In office 17 March 2010 – 17 June 2015
- Succeeded by: Position abolished
- In office 10 August 1979 – 21 March 2007

Personal details
- Born: David Ernest Buffett; 17 October 1942 (age 83) Sydney, New South Wales, Australia
- Spouse(s): Margaret Anne Buffett (née Whitehead)

David Ernest Buffett AM (born 17 October 1942) is a political figure from the Australian territory of Norfolk Island. He served as Chief Minister of Norfolk Island from March 2010 to March 2013; he has also held the position three previous occasions. He is the longest-serving member of the Norfolk Island Legislative Assembly, having served on every Assembly (except one) since it was established in 1979.

== Chief Minister of Norfolk Island ==
Buffett was Chief Minister of Norfolk Island, from 24 March 2010 – 20 March 2013, and previously from 2 June 2006, when he succeeded Geoffrey Robert Gardner, to 28 March 2007, when he was succeeded by Andre Nobbs, having lost his parliamentary seat in the election held on 21 March. (He polled only 355 votes out of 9720 and finished 11th out of 17 candidates for Norfolk's single nine-member constituency).

Buffett had previously held the post of Chief Minister of the territory from 1979 to 1986, and a roughly equivalent title of President of the Legislative Assembly from 1989 to 1992.

== Speaker of the Norfolk Legislative Assembly ==
Buffet was elected Speaker of the Norfolk Legislative Assembly on 20 March 2013. He previously served as Speaker from 1994–1997 and 2000–2006.
