= List of heads of government of Norfolk Island =

This article lists the heads of government of Norfolk Island.

== List of officeholders ==
(Dates in italics indicate de facto continuation of office, irrespective of continuation of status of that office)

Term	Incumbent	Title	Notes
1896 to 15 January 1897	Oliver Masey Quintal	President of the Council of Elders	
15 January 1897	Self-government revoked		
15 January 1897 to 1899	Oliver Masey Quintal	President of the Council of Elders	
1899 to 1900	John Buffett	President of the Council of Elders	
1900 to 1903	John Forrester Young	President of the Council of Elders	
1903 to 1909	Francis Mason Nobbs	President of the Executive Council	
1909 to 1915	Joseph Allen McCleave Buffett	President of the Executive Council	
1915 to 1 July 1916	Charles Chase Ray Nobbs	President of the Executive Council	1st term
Norfolk Island Territory of The Commonwealth of Australia
1916	Charles Chase Ray Nobbs	President of the Executive Council	1st term (contd.)
1916 to 1919	Matthew Frederick Howard Christian	President of the Executive Council	
1919 to 1920	Albert Randall	President of the Executive Council	1st term
1921 to 1922	Enoch Cobbcroft Robinson	President of the Executive Council	1st term
1922 to 1923	Albert Randall	President of the Executive Council	2nd term
1924 to 1928	Eustace Buffett Christian	President of the Executive Council	1st term
1928 to 1933	Enoch Cobbcroft Robinson	President of the Executive Council	2nd term
1933 to 19 May 1934	Charles Chase Ray Nobbs	President of the Executive Council	2nd term
1934 to 1934	Eustace Buffett Christian	President of the Executive Council	2nd term
1934 to 20 July 1935	Francis Rawdon M. Crozier	President of the Executive Council	
1 August 1935 to 31 July 1936	Charles Chase Ray Nobbs	President of the Advisory Council	
1 August 1936 to 31 July 1937	Enoch Cobbcroft Robinson	President of the Advisory Council	1st term
1 August 1937 to 31 July 1941	William McLachlan	President of the Advisory Council	
1 August 1941 to 31 July 1947	George Hunn Nobbs Buffett	President of the Advisory Council	
1 August 1947 to 31 July 1948	Ray Herbert Hastings Nobbs	President of the Advisory Council	1st term
1 August 1948 to 31 July 1949	David Campbell Dunsmere Buffett	President of the Advisory Council	
1 August 1949 to 31 July 1950	Ray Herbert Hastings Nobbs	President of the Advisory Council	2nd term
1 August 1950 to 31 July 1951	Leonard Dixon Holloway	President of the Advisory Council	1st term
1 August 1951 to 5 June 1952	Enoch Cobcroft Robinson	President of the Advisory Council	2nd term
1 August 1952 to 31 October 1952	Leonard Dixon Holloway	President of the Advisory Council	2nd term
1 November 1952 to 31 July 1953	Charles Marie Gustav Adams	President of the Advisory Council	
1 August 1953 to 31 July 1956	Ray Herbert Hastings Nobbs	President of the Advisory Council	3rd term
1 August 1956 to 15 June 1959	Wilfrid Metcalfe Randall	President of the Advisory Council	
15 June 1959 to 22 June 1960	vacant		
22 June 1960 to 1967	Frederick James Needham	President of the Island Council	
1967 to 1974	William M. Randall	President of the Island Council	
1974 to 1976	Richard Albert Bataille	President of the Island Council	
1976 to 1978	William Arthur Blucher	President of the Island Council	
10 August 1978	Restoration of self-government		
10 August 1979 to 21 May 1986	David Buffett	Chief Minister	
21 May 1986 to 22 May 1989	John Terence Brown	President of the Legislative Assembly	
22 May 1989 to 20 May 1992	David Buffett	President of the Legislative Assembly	
20 May 1992 to 4 May 1994	John Terence Brown	Head of Government	
4 May 1994 to 5 May 1997	Mike King	Head of Government	
5 May 1997 to 28 February 2000	George Charles Smith	Chief Minister	
28 February 2000 to 5 December 2001	Ronald Coane Nobbs	Chief Minister	
5 December 2001 to 1 June 2006	Geoff Gardner	Chief Minister	
2 June 2006 to 28 March 2007	David Buffett	Chief Minister	
28 March 2007 to 24 March 2010	Andre Nobbs	Chief Minister	
24 March 2010 to 20 March 2013	David Buffett	Chief Minister	
20 March 2013 to 17 June 2015	Lisle Snell	Chief Minister	
18 June 2015	Self-government abolished; under Commonwealth and New South Wales laws		
6 July 2016 to 4 February 2021	Robin Adams	Mayor	
4 February 2021 to November 2024	Mike Colreavy	Interim administrator	
November 2024 to present	Scott Mason	Lead administrator	
	Pending transition to Norfolk Island Assembly		

== See also ==
- History of Norfolk Island
- List of administrative heads of Norfolk Island
