= Norfolk Island Legislative Assembly =

Former deliberative body of Norfolk Island

Type
- Type: Unicameral

History
- Founded: 10 August 1979
- Disbanded: 17 June 2015
- Preceded by: Norfolk Island Council
- Succeeded by: Norfolk Island Regional Council

Structure
- Seats: 9
- Political groups: Independent (8); Liberal (1)

Meeting place
- Old Military Barracks, Quality Row, Kingston, Norfolk Island, South Pacific

The Norfolk Island Legislative Assembly was the prime legislative body of Norfolk Island from 1979 to 2015. Formed after the Norfolk Island Act 1979 was passed in the Australian Parliament, its first members were elected on 10 August 1979. The last assembly was the 14th, elected on 13 March 2013. On 17 June 2015, the Australian Government abolished the assembly, ending self-government on the island. Norfolk Island Regional Council, a local government body instituted under New South Wales law and with significantly-restricted powers, was established in July 2016 to perform local-level governance on the island.

== Membership ==
The Assembly had 9 members, elected for a three-year term. The Assembly was elected by a popular vote for a term of not more than three years. Electors each had nine equal votes, which could be divided in any way between candidates, but no more than two votes could be given to any particular individual candidate. This variation of cumulative voting is called the "weighted first past the post system".

All nine seats were held by independents, as Norfolk Island did not have major political parties. However, a local branch of the Australian Labor Party was active.

On 20 March 2013, the first meeting of the 14th Legislative Assembly elected Chief Minister, Speaker and Deputy Speaker:

- Lisle Snell – Chief Minister
- Robin Adams – Minister for Cultural Heritage and Community Services
- Ronald John Ward – Minister for Environment
- Timothy John Sheridan – Minister for Finance
- Melissa Ward
- David Buffett AM – Speaker
- David Raymond Porter
- Ronald Coane Nobbs – Deputy Speaker
- Hadyn Paul Evans

== Abolition ==
In March 2015, the Australian government announced that the Assembly would be replaced with a regional council, as part of a plan to bring the governance of Norfolk Island into line with the rest of Australia. A five-person Community Advisory Council would be set up to manage the transition, with Chief Minister Snell and Speaker Buffett being invited to be members.

In 2014, Snell travelled to Canberra to argue against a complete change to the arrangements governing the island. He did not oppose the island joining Australia's tax and welfare system, but maintained that it should retain similar powers to a state or territory government.

Snell's overtures and a non-binding referendum held on the island were unsuccessful, and the Assembly met for the last time on 17 June 2015.

After a transition period of more than a year, local government power was officially returned to Norfolk Island with the establishment of the Norfolk Island Regional Council on 1 July 2016, with the Commonwealth continuing to govern the island for all but local-level matters.

== New assembly ==
On 13 November 2024, the Federal Minister for Regional Development, local Government and Territories, Kristy McBain, announced a new governance model for the island – the Norfolk Island Assembly – and the extension of the administration period under a new administration team replacing Colreavy. The Minister appointed a Lead Administrator, Scott Mason, and a Financial Administrator, Gary Mottau, who both commenced on 6 December 2024.

== See also ==
- List of speakers of the Norfolk Legislative Assembly
- Politics of Norfolk Island
- Cabinet of Norfolk Island
