= Douglas Woolley =

English claimant of RMS Titanic (1936—2022)

Douglas Faulkner-Woolley
- Woolley in 2009
- Born: 1936; Liverpool, England, United Kingdom
- Died: 2022 (aged 86)
- Occupation: CEO of Seawise Titanic Salvage Co.
- Known for: Claiming to own the wreck of the Titanic

Douglas John Faulkner-Woolley (1936—2022) was a Titanic eccentric who claimed to own the legal rights to the wreck of the ship. He was also the founder and CEO of Seawise Titanic Salvage Co. For most of his life, Woolley planned to raise the wreck of Titanic, a scheme that never came to fruition.

== Early life ==
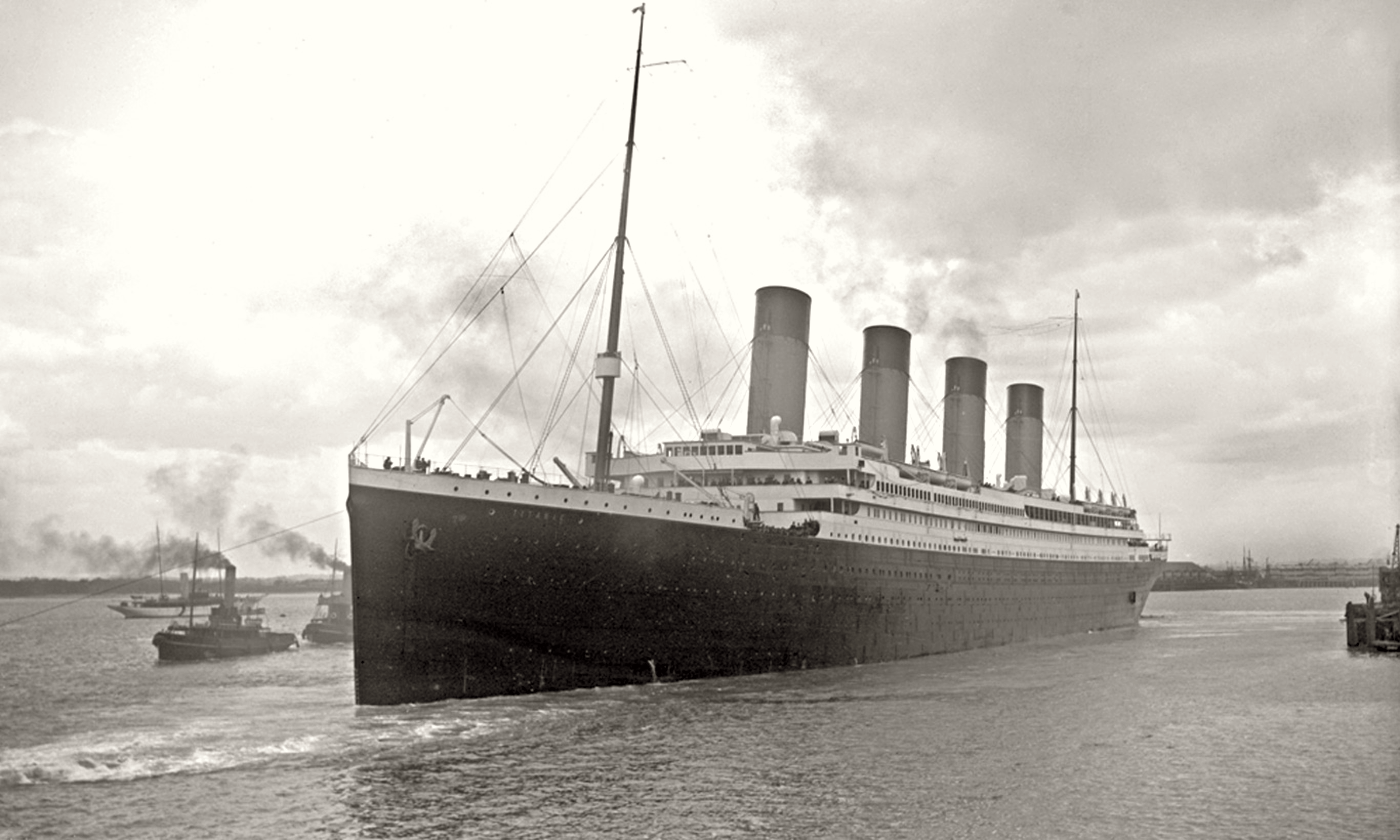
Titanic leaving Southampton, England, on 10 April 1912

Woolley was born in Liverpool in 1936. As a child, his uncle told him a story regarding his two great-aunts, Sally and Ellen, who booked passage on the doomed ocean liner Titanic. The aunts supposedly canceled their tickets after having premonitions of the disaster. Their luggage was already aboard, however, and ended up going down with the ship. As an adult, Woolley became a hosier worker in Baldock, England.

== Claims to the wreck ==
Woolley made several claims to the wreck of Titanic, under United Kingdom Maritime Law. Titanic was a British ship registered in Liverpool and built in Belfast. White Star Line, the operator of Titanic, filed for bankruptcy and merged with their rival, Cunard Line, in 1934. Cunard completely dropped the White Star name in 1950, and thus, by Woolley's logic, disowned the right to Titanic's wreck.

The claim was registered in 1981 with the British Board of Trade, and has not been challenged in the United Kingdom. When the wreck was found in 1985, there was much debate over who owned the wreck, but Woolley's claim was still untested. Woolley says that RMS Titanic, Inc.'s claim on the wreck is invalid, as Titanic is a British ship in international waters.

== Plans to raise Titanic ==
Woolley planned to inflate nylon balloons attached to the ship's hull to bring it up to the surface. The plan called for a bathyscaphe to attach the balloons. The ship, once raised, would be taken to Liverpool and converted into a museum. It was estimated that the mission would cost about £2 million (£38.7 million in today's money).

A company named Titanic Salvage Company was created to conduct the operation, and West Berlin businessmen created an entity named Titanic-Tresor to finance the company. It was calculated that it would take years to create enough gas to overcome the water pressure, and the project lost steam after Woolley was unable to find an alternate way to inflate the balloons.

Woolley's next plan involved using seawater electrolysis to create 85,000 cubic yards of hydrogen. The hydrogen would be placed into plastic bags, which would be attached to the ship, and would raise it. Woolley managed to get a handful of Hungarian inventors aboard, and claimed that it would take a week to create all of the necessary hydrogen. An American chemistry professor, however, calculated that the time needed to create all of the hydrogen would be closer to 10 years, and the Hungarian inventors abandoned the idea, empty-handed.

== RMS Queen Elizabeth ==
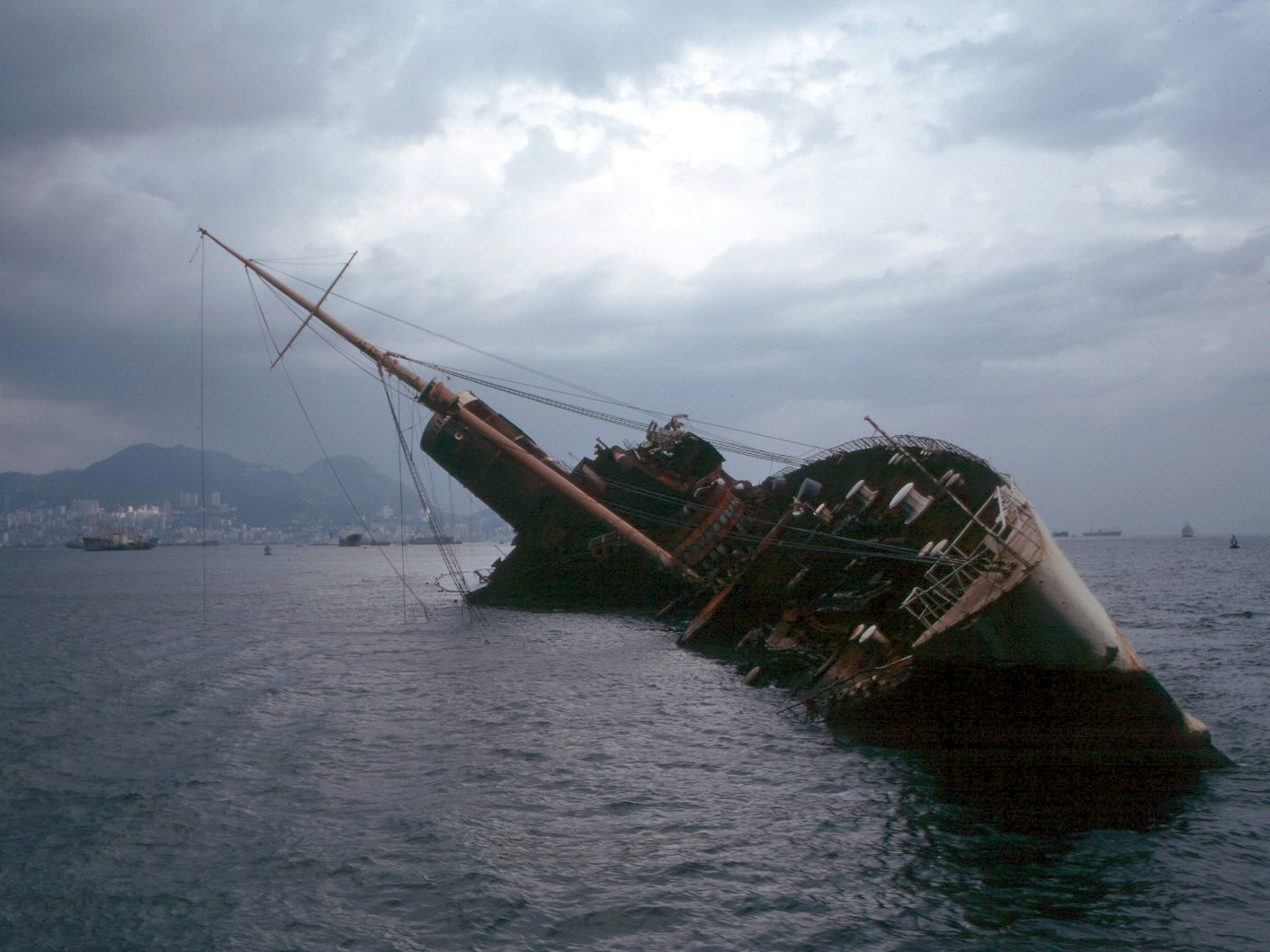
Wreck of the Seawise University

Woolley soon turned his sights to the wreck of RMS Queen Elizabeth, which had been purchased by a Hong Kong-based company, Seawise Campus, in 1970. Seawise Campus planned to convert Queen Elizabeth into a floating university campus. Once docked in Hong Kong, Queen Elizabeth was renamed to Seawise University. Construction began on converting the ship to a university campus, under direction of the Hong Kong tycoon Tung Chao-yung. The ship began to be stripped of her fittings, preparing her for her service as a university campus. On 9 January 1972, in Hong Kong harbor, the ship caught fire before rolling onto her side.

Woolley sold many of his possessions and moved to Hong Kong. He planned to raise the ship as a test to prove that his Titanic endeavor would be possible. However, he decided to move back to Liverpool in 1973. On Woolley's last day in Hong Kong, a government commission decided that the wreck of Seawise University was in too poor of a condition to be safely raised. The ship would be dismantled from 1974 to 1975.

== Titanic and Seawise Salvage ==
Woolley returned to London homeless, jobless, and broke. He eventually moved in with a BBC reporter, where he met a young man named Steven while walking through Edmonton. With new hope, Woolley renamed his company to Titanic and Seawise Salvage. Woolley said that if they found bodies when they raised the ship, that he would "treat them with respect."

Woolley declined to join the Titanic Historical Society, and thus he was left out of the picture when HMHS Britannic, Titanic's younger sister ship, was discovered by Jacques Cousteau in July 1976.

New technology like drilling rigs helped Woolley bring his dream closer to reality. He planned to sit on the ship above as the Titanic was raised. He could have compressed air shot, via an ROV, into pontoons that would float to the surface and raise the ship.

== Post-discovery life ==
Robert Ballard and Jean-Louis Michel's 1985 discovery of Titanic left Woolley in excitement. Even though the ship was found in two pieces, he still hoped to raise the wreck.

Woolley gained a reputation as the person who wanted to raise Titanic for most of his life. Children wrote him letters, articles were written about him, and he was invited to talk in universities all around England. A biography about Woolley titled Titanic: One Man's Dream, was written by Clive Amphlett and was published in 1998.

Woolley died in 2022 at the age of 86.
