= RV Le Suroît =

French research vessel, built 1975

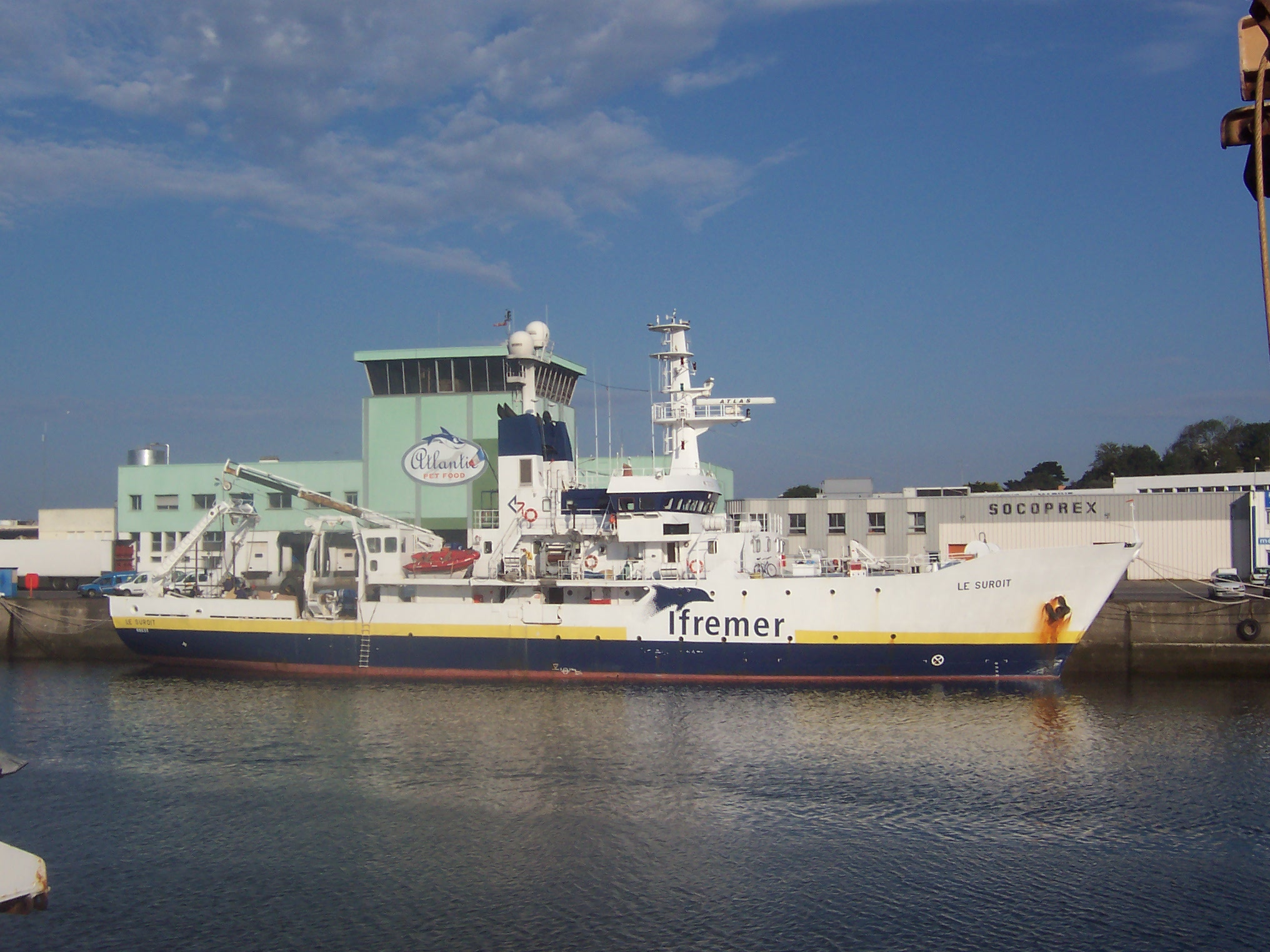
- Le Suroît docked in Concarneau in 2007

History

France
- Name: RV Le Suroît
- Owner: IFREMER
- Operator: Genavir
- Builder: Ateliers et Chantiers de la Manche, Dieppe
- Launched: 20 July 1974
- Refit: 1999
- Home port: Brest
- Identification: IMO number: 7360368; MMSI number: 356731000; Callsign: HO6428
- Status: Active in service

General characteristics
- Type: Research vessel
- Tonnage: 946 GT
- Displacement: 1,132 long tons
- Length: 56.34 m (184.8 ft)
- Beam: 11 m (36 ft)
- Draught: 4.10 m (13.5 ft)
- Installed power: 2 × 600 hp (450 kW); 1 × 210 hp (160 kW)
- Speed: 10 knots (19 km/h; 12 mph)
- Capacity: 14 (without accommodation container); 17 (with accommodation container)
- Crew: 16–23

RV Le Suroît is a French research vessel operated by IFREMER. In 1985, it was involved in the successful Franco-American expedition to find the wreck of the RMS Titanic.

Since being refurbished in 1999, the vessel is able to undertake bathymetric and seismic research, as well as coring, dredging, and trawling tasks.

== History ==
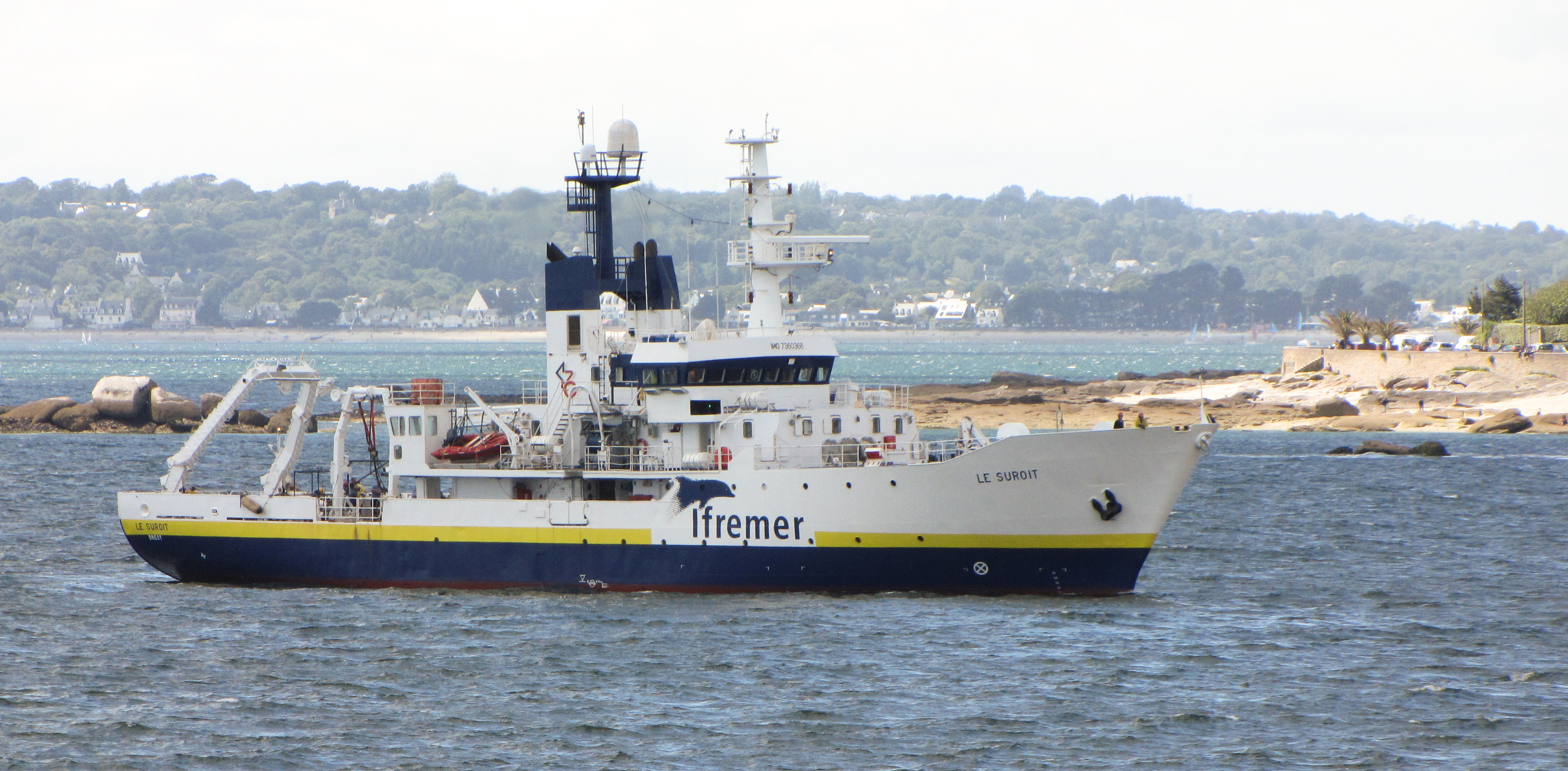
Le Suroît

The vessel was commissioned and built in 1975 by Ateliers et Chantiers de la Manche in Dieppe, Seine-Maritime. In 1985, the ship was equipped with the new System Acoustique Remorqué (SAR) sonar device. In early summer, the vessel undertook a 10-day sonar mission in an attempt to find the wreckage of RMS Titanic. Aboard Le Suroît on this mission was Robert Ballard. Le Suroît was able to rule out large sections of a pre-determined 150-square-mile (390 km^{2}) search area – between 26 July and 6 August, 80% of the area had been searched. It later transpired that on one of its first passes, Le Suroît had come within only 3,300 feet (1,000 m) of Titanic. The mission ended on 6 August, after which RV Knorr travelled from the Azores to concentrate on more specific areas using different strategies.

In October 2011, the vessel was on assignment in Crete before travelling to La Seyne-sur-Mer in December.

== Facilities and equipment ==
The vessel is equipped with a range of devices. The computers run IFREMER's CARAIBES mapping software. The coring cable is 8 kilometres (5.0 mi) long and is made of Kevlar. It has a safe working load (SWL) of 8 tons. The ship also has a 6-kilometre (3.7 mi) steel winch, with an SWL of 2.1 tons. The average cruising speed, and the speed at which surveying is undertaken, is approximately 10 knots (19 km/h; 12 mph).
