= RMS Titanic Maritime Memorial Act =

1986 United States Act of Congress

R.M.S. Titanic Maritime Memorial Act of 1986
- Long title: An Act to encourage international efforts to designate the shipwreck of the R.M.S. Titanic as an international maritime memorial and to provide for reasonable research, exploration and, if appropriate, salvage activities with respect to the shipwreck.
- Enacted by: the 99th United States Congress
- Effective: October 21, 1986

Citations
- Public law: 99-513
- Statutes at Large: 100 Stat. 2082

Codification
- Titles amended: 16 U.S.C.: Conservation
- U.S.C. sections created: 16 U.S.C. ch. 1, subch. LXI § 450rr et seq.

Legislative history
- Introduced in the Senate as S. 2048 by Lowell P. Weicker Jr. (R–CT) on February 5, 1986; Committee consideration by House Committee on Merchant Marine and Fisheries, Senate Foreign Relations; Passed the Senate on September 24, 1986 (passed voice vote); Passed the House on October 6, 1986 (passed voice vote); Signed into law by President Ronald Reagan on October 21, 1986

The R.M.S. Titanic Maritime Memorial Act of 1986 (100 Stat. 2082, 16 U.S.C. §§ 450rr–450rr-6) is a United States Act of Congress that was passed to designate the wreck of the RMS Titanic as an international maritime memorial and to regulate the research, exploration and salvage of the wreckage. The Act became law on October 21, 1986, when it was passed by the 99th United States Congress.

== Background ==
According to a 1985 report, the United States Congress was concerned about potential damage caused to the Titanic's wreck caused by salvagers. The report found that:

1. "The R.M.S. Titanic, the ocean liner which sank on her maiden voyage after striking an iceberg on April 14, 1912, should be designated as an international maritime memorial to the men, women, and children who perished aboard her"
2. "The recent discovery of the R.M.S. Titanic, lying more than twelve thousand feet beneath the ocean surface, demonstrates the practical applications of ocean science and engineering"
3. "The R.M.S. Titanic, well preserved in the cold, oxygen-poor waters of the deep North Atlantic Ocean, is of major national and international cultural and historical significance, and merits appropriate international protection"
4. "The R.M.S. Titanic represents a special opportunity for deep ocean scientific research and exploration"

== Enactment ==
Walter B. Jones, Sr. (the Democratic Congressman for North Carolina) oversaw the submission of a bill, HR 3272, to the House of Representatives on September 11, 1985. On October 29, the United States House Committee on Merchant Marine and Fisheries debated HR 3272, with the hearing discovering that the United States had no jurisdiction over the site of Titanic's wreck. Even Canada, geographically closest to the wreck, would have had difficulty claiming legal jurisdiction as the wreck was deemed to be in "high seas".

On February 5, 1986, Jones championed a similar bill that was presented to the Senate, which proposed that until an international agreement could be negotiated, no individual would be permitted to physically alter, disturb, or salvage the wreckage. The Senate bill was signed by President Ronald Reagan on October 21, 1986, creating the RMS Titanic Maritime Memorial Act. The Act aimed to "encourage recognition of the wreck as a maritime memorial to those who lost their lives when it sank, to promote the development of an international agreement providing for the protection of the wreck, and to cultivate internationally recognized guidelines for research, exploration and, if appropriate, salvage activities."

Upon signing the bill, Reagan issued the following statement:

Although I support the purpose of this act, I must register my objections to two of its provisions. Section 5(a) directs the Administrator of the National Oceanic and Atmospheric Administration to enter into consultations with foreign nations; section 6(a) directs the Secretary of State to enter into negotiations with foreign nations. If interpreted literally, these requirements would contravene my constitutional authority to conduct foreign relations. To avoid this constitutional difficulty, these provisions must be viewed as discretionary. Entry into negotiations with the appropriate nations concerning the R.M.S Titanic is, of course, dependent on the willingness of those nations to support the development of the international agreement and guidelines encouraged by this act. I invite interested nations to join us in this endeavor.

After the Act's passing, the Department of State proposed an agreement with the United Kingdom, Canada and France (as well as other interested countries) to enact the policies from the 1986 Act on an international scale. Known as the "Agreement Concerning the Shipwrecked Vessel R.M.S. Titanic", Canada and France did not ratify it, though the signature of only two countries is sufficient for the agreement to enter force – the United Kingdom ratified the agreement on November 6, 2003, and it was subsequently signed by the United States on June 18, 2004. The agreement went into effect in 2019, with the United States' ratification.
