= Jack Grimm =

American oil tycoon and explorer

Jack F. Grimm
- Born: Jack Francis Grimm; May 18, 1925; Wagoner, Oklahoma, U.S.
- Died: January 6, 1998 (aged 72); Abilene, Texas, U.S.
- Education: University of Oklahoma
- Occupations: Oil wildcatter, explorer, author

Jack Francis Grimm (May 18, 1925 – January 6, 1998), nicknamed "Cadillac Jack," was an American independent oil tycoon, geologist, author and explorer. He achieved international notoriety in the late 20th century for financing expeditions to locate historical artifacts and legends and, to no avail, led three searches for the wreck of the Titanic.

== Early life and education ==
Grimm was born on May 18, 1925, in Wagoner, Oklahoma to Suell Hinkle Grimm and Ida Mae Vermillion. He served as a Marine Corps demolition expert during World War II. Following the war he attended the University of Oklahoma and graduated with a degree in oil geology. During his studies, he was inspired to pursue independent wildcatting after visiting classmate Nelson Bunker Hunt, son of the billionaire oil tycoon H. L. Hunt.

== Oil career ==
Grimm attempted to pan for gold while on his honeymoon in California before he started drilling for oil through independent wells. Even though his initial attempt at drilling in Oklahoma was profitable, he lost large amounts of money after drilling 25 unsuccessful wells in Texas. The 26th attempt, however, was successful, and Grimm was able to tap into an oil reserve that would yield $1,000 daily and thus make him a millionaire by the age of 31. He then founded Grimm Oil Company in Abilene, Texas.

== Expeditions ==
=== Noah's Ark searches (1970–1974) ===
Grimm participated in three total trips to Turkey to search Mount Ararat for Noah's Ark. His obsession began in 1970 after he read a newspaper article about an upcoming French search. He immediately phoned sponsors, offered financial backing and joined the team. They found nothing.

In 1974 Grimm financed his own independent expedition. He located and dug up a massive chunk of structural wood from the mountainside and carried it in his briefcase for the rest of his life, insisting it was a piece of the Ark. To recoup his $20,000 investment he packaged his footage into a 1975 documentary titled Ark of Noah, which became a success via cable television.

=== Loch Ness Monster and Bigfoot searches ===
Grimm poured hundreds of thousands of dollars into Scotland's famous loch to prove the existence the Loch Ness Monster. He financed underwater sonar sweeps of the lake bed to search for large moving targets. This later inspired the method used in Grimm's three attempts to find the Titanic.

Concurrently with his Loch Ness efforts, Grimm sponsored professional tracking operations in the wilderness of the Pacific Northwest to prove the existence of Bigfoot. He hired trackers and funded equipment to try and capture photographic or physical evidence of the Sasquatch, to no avail.

=== Proving the Hollow Earth Theory ===
In the late 1970s Grimm became fascinated by the pseudoscientific Hollow Earth hypothesis, which claimed that a super-race lived inside the planet. He openly researched, mapped and sought to finance an expedition to the North Pole to locate a giant hole that served as the gateway to the center of the Earth. Grimm abandoned the project in 1979.

=== Titanic searches (1980–1983) ===
Between 1980 and 1983 Grimm financed three major scientific expeditions to locate the wreckage of the RMS Titanic, spending over $2 million of his own money and additional funds raised from poker games and media rights sales managed by the William Morris Agency.

In 1980 Grimm partnered with Columbia University's Lamont–Doherty Geological Observatory, donating $330,000 for a wide-sweep sonar system in exchange for technical support from scientists, including Dr. William B. F. Ryan and Dr. Fred Spiess. The expedition drew controversy after Grimm attempted to bring a trained monkey named Titan to locate the wreck via "primate ESP." The scientists issued an ultimatum: "It's either us or the monkey." Grimm initially chose the monkey but due to scientist objections, the monkey was eventually left ashore. The 1980 sonar run departed from Port Everglades aboard research vessel H.J.W. Fay and ultimately passed over the Titanic but failed to register it due to technical limitations.

Grimm's second attempt in 1981 captured an underwater camera frame of a large metallic object on the sea floor. Grimm claimed the object was one of the Titanic's propeller blades, a claim that was disputed by his scientific consultants. There has since been much debate over what Grimm actually found, and it was later discovered that the ship had passed within 1.5 miles of the actual wreck site. The object would never be located again.

Grimm's third and final attempt in 1983 resulted in an inconclusive sonar scan that was performed before oceanographer Robert Ballard successfully located the wreck in 1985. Grimm maintained until his death that his 1981 expedition had found the ship first.

== Later activities ==
In the 1980s and 90s Grimm began a project to blast a 40-foot tall, 2,000-foot long sculpture of a buffalo into a mountain gap on his land in Buffalo Gap, Texas. In the process, Grimm also considered carving the face of Bill Clinton or Ross Perot on the opposite cliffs. This project was eventually abandoned due to high costs.

== Personal life and legacy ==
Grimm was married to Jacqueline Elizabeth "Jackie" Crain on December 21, 1947, in Seminole, Oklahoma. The couple had met while both were studying geology at the University of Oklahoma. They had two children: a son, Gary and a daughter, Cheryl.

Grimm was notoriously eccentric. He dressed in custom made cowboy boots and smoked expensive cigars while driving different custom Cadillacs, eventually being nicknamed Cadillac Jack because of this. He was also an excellent poker player who used the game of poker to network with other rich oil tycoons for additional funding of his exploration projects.

=== Death ===
Grimm was diagnosed with prostate cancer in the mid-1990s. He died from complications of the disease at Hendrick Medical Center in Abilene, Texas on January 6, 1998, aged 72.

== In popular culture ==
- The 1981 documentary feature film The Search for the Titanic, which Grimm produced and financed, was narrated by Orson Welles.
- Comic book writer Scott Snyder cited Grimm's name and historical background as a wealthy, eccentric Texan as the inspiration for naming "Jack Grimm," the billionaire corporate alter-ego of the Joker in the 2024 DC Comics Absolute Batman series.

== Bibliography ==
- Grimm, Jack (1982). Beyond Reach: The Search for the Titanic. Vivisphere Publishing. ISBN 978-1-58742-004-7

== See also ==
- Wreck of the Titanic
- Titanic
- Robert Ballard
