= Titanic Canyon =

Submarine canyon in the North Atlantic Ocean

Titanic Canyon is a submarine canyon located south of the Grand Banks of Newfoundland, Canada. Its name was proposed in 1991 by marine geologist Alan Ruffman in remembrance of British passenger liner RMS Titanic, the wreck of which lies about 34 km (21 mi) south of the head of Titanic Canyon on its eastern slope.
