= The Big Piece =

Large section of the Titanic's hull

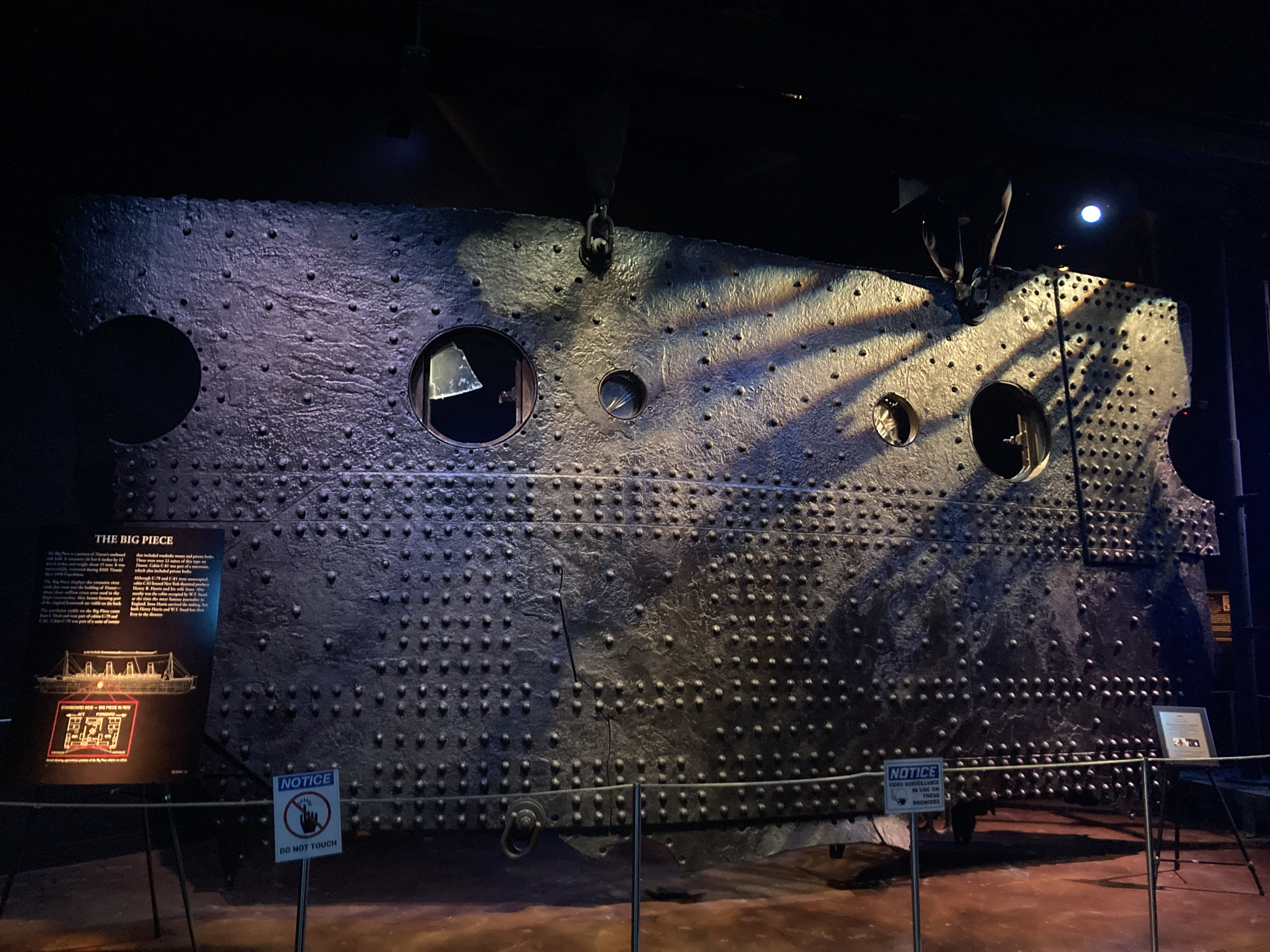
- The Big Piece on display in December 2023
- Material: Iron and bronze
- Height: 20 ft (6.1 m)
- Width: 26 ft (7.9 m)
- Weight: 15 short tons (14,000 kg)
- Discovered: 1994
- Present location: Titanic: The Artifact Exhibition in Luxor Las Vegas

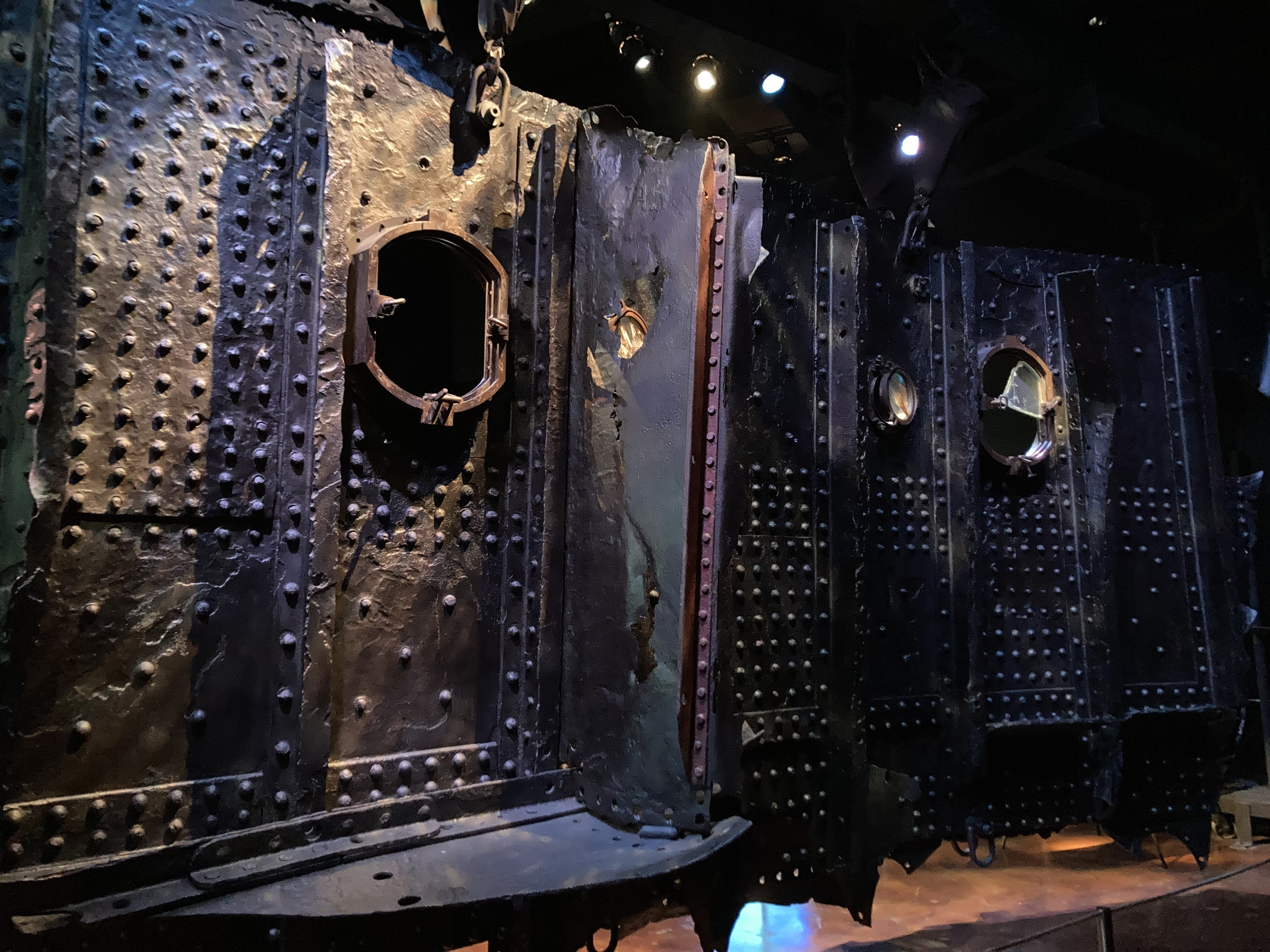
Opposite side

The Big Piece is a large section of the Titanic's starboard hull extracted from its wreck. Recovered in 1998, it is the largest piece of the wreck to be recovered and weighs 15 short tons (14 t). It is currently located at the Titanic: The Artifact Exhibition at Luxor Las Vegas.

== History ==
=== Recovery ===
First spotted in 1994, The Big Piece was recovered by RMS Titanic, Inc., headed by George Tulloch and Paul-Henri Nargeolet, in 1998. It was chosen to be brought to the surface to act as a centerpiece for a planned exhibition where visitors could "immerse themselves in the Titanic." During a failed attempt in 1996, the submersible Nautile attached flotation bags that would lift the artifact to the surface when released. During the two hours it took for the hull to ascend, two cruise ships gathered near the site and allowed occupants to watch. Before it had surfaced, the Canadian ship MV Jim Kilabuk arrived to bring the object to Halifax. However, it did not have a winch appropriate for the job, and the piece fell back into the ocean when the lines broke during Hurricane Edouard. In August 1998, the Abeille Supporter was able to successfully lift the hull section to the deck. It weighed about 20 short tons (18,000 kg) when first recovered.

=== Conservation ===
The hull ended up being stored in Boston and broken into two parts, due to some concerns about its size during transportation and exhibition. The second piece was not very large as it was just an extending part. Before being cleaned, it had many rusticles. Many of the bronze parts of the hull, such as the windows, were still in working condition, and remnants of paint could be seen in some areas. Conservation was headed by LP3 Conservation from France and EverGreene Architectural Arts. The artifact was desalinated using sacrificial anodes and soaked in sodium carbonate for 18 months. During the soaking period, it traveled to venues in Boston, St. Paul, and New York City. The rusticles and some loose corroded parts were removed by a 3,000-psi water jet. The piece was then dried using propane torches and the remaining debris was hand-picked off. To neutralize the rust, conservationists applied a 5% tannic acid solution and hot waxed it.

After traveling for a while, being exhibited at places such as the Metreon in San Francisco, the Big Piece ended up on display at the Titanic: The Artifact Exhibition at the Luxor in Las Vegas, which opened in 2008. It has received 22 million visitors as of 2023. The Little Piece is located at a similar exhibition in Orlando, Florida.
