= Agreement Concerning the Shipwrecked Vessel RMS Titanic =

International maritime treaty

- Drafted: 6 November 2003
- Location: London, United Kingdom
- Effective: November 18, 2019
- Condition: Consent to be bound by two parties
- Parties: United Kingdom; United States
- Depositary: Government of the United Kingdom of Great Britain and Northern Ireland
- Language: English and French

Full text
- Agreement Concerning the Shipwrecked Vessel RMS Titanic at Wikisource

The Agreement Concerning the Shipwrecked Vessel RMS Titanic is a treaty open to all states regarding the protection of the shipwreck of the RMS Titanic. Following the passage of the RMS Titanic Maritime Memorial Act in 1986, the United States began negotiations in 1997 with the United Kingdom, France, and Canada toward an agreement to protect the wreck. The agreement was signed by the UK in 2003 and by the US in 2004. It was not until 2019 that the US ratified the agreement, bringing it into effect on 18 November, the day of deposit of the instrument of ratification.

== Background ==
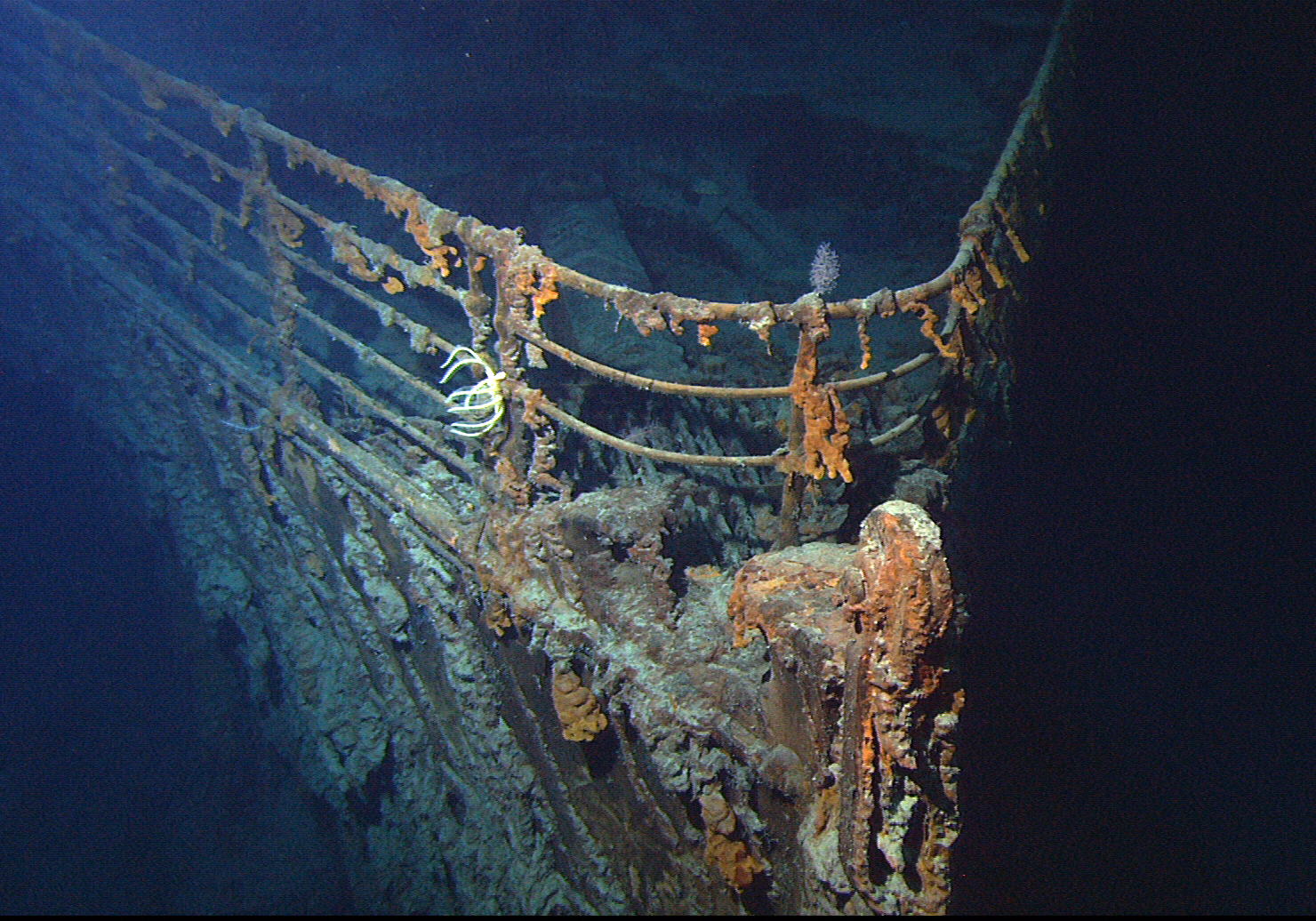
Bow of the wrecked Titanic in 2004

In 1912, the British ocean liner, RMS Titanic, sank after colliding with an iceberg in the North Atlantic Ocean while en route from Southampton to New York City. The location of its shipwreck was unknown until its discovery in 1985 by Robert Ballard, 350 nautical miles (400 mi; 650 km) off the coast of Newfoundland, Canada. Ballard neglected to make a claim of salvage, which allowed the wreck to become subject to looting and unregulated salvage operations. In response, the United States passed the RMS Titanic Maritime Memorial Act in 1986, which recognized the shipwreck as an international maritime memorial, and authorized the National Oceanic and Atmospheric Administration and the Department of State to negotiate an international agreement to protect the wreck.

== Negotiation and ratification ==
Negotiations between the United Kingdom, United States, France, and Canada began in 1997, and were concluded on 5 January 2000 producing an agreement. The UK signed the resulting agreement on 6 November 2003, using a "definitive signature without reservation as to ratification", and passed The Protection of Wrecks (RMS Titanic) Order 2003 under the Merchant Shipping Act to implement it. The United States signed the agreement on 18 June 2004.

On 15 April 2012, the Titanic wreck, which lies in international waters, automatically became protected by UNESCO, under the 2001 Convention on the Protection of the Underwater Cultural Heritage, which protects cultural, historical, or archaeological objects that have been underwater for 100 years.

It was not until 18 November 2019 that the treaty was ratified by US Secretary of State, Mike Pompeo, on behalf of the United States. On that date, the instrument of ratification was deposited with the United Kingdom and the agreement went into effect. The treaty required ratification by only two of the four negotiating parties for it to become effective. The treaty requires both the United Kingdom and the United States to regulate persons and vessels under their respective jurisdictions in their interactions with the wreck. Specifically, both countries can grant or deny licenses to permit entry into the shipwreck or to remove items from it. The UK has expressed its intention to urge other North Atlantic countries to join the agreement, especially Canada and France.
