= Jean-Louis Michel (oceanographer) =

French oceanographer and engineer (born 1945)

- Born: 1945 (age 80–81)
- Occupation: Oceanographer
- Known for: Discovery of the wreck of RMS Titanic

Jean-Louis Michel (born 1945) is a French oceanographer and engineer.

He discovered subsea intervention in 1969 with the French Navy as an officer at the Groupe des Bathyscaphes headed by Captain Georges Houot. In 1985, Jean-Louis Michel (along with marine geologist Robert Ballard) led a team of French and American explorers who found the wreckage of the RMS Titanic.

Robert Ballard mentions in an interview with Forbes magazine that Jean-Louis Michel rarely gets enough credit for co-discovering the Titanic.
