= Rusticle =

Rust formation often on shipwrecks

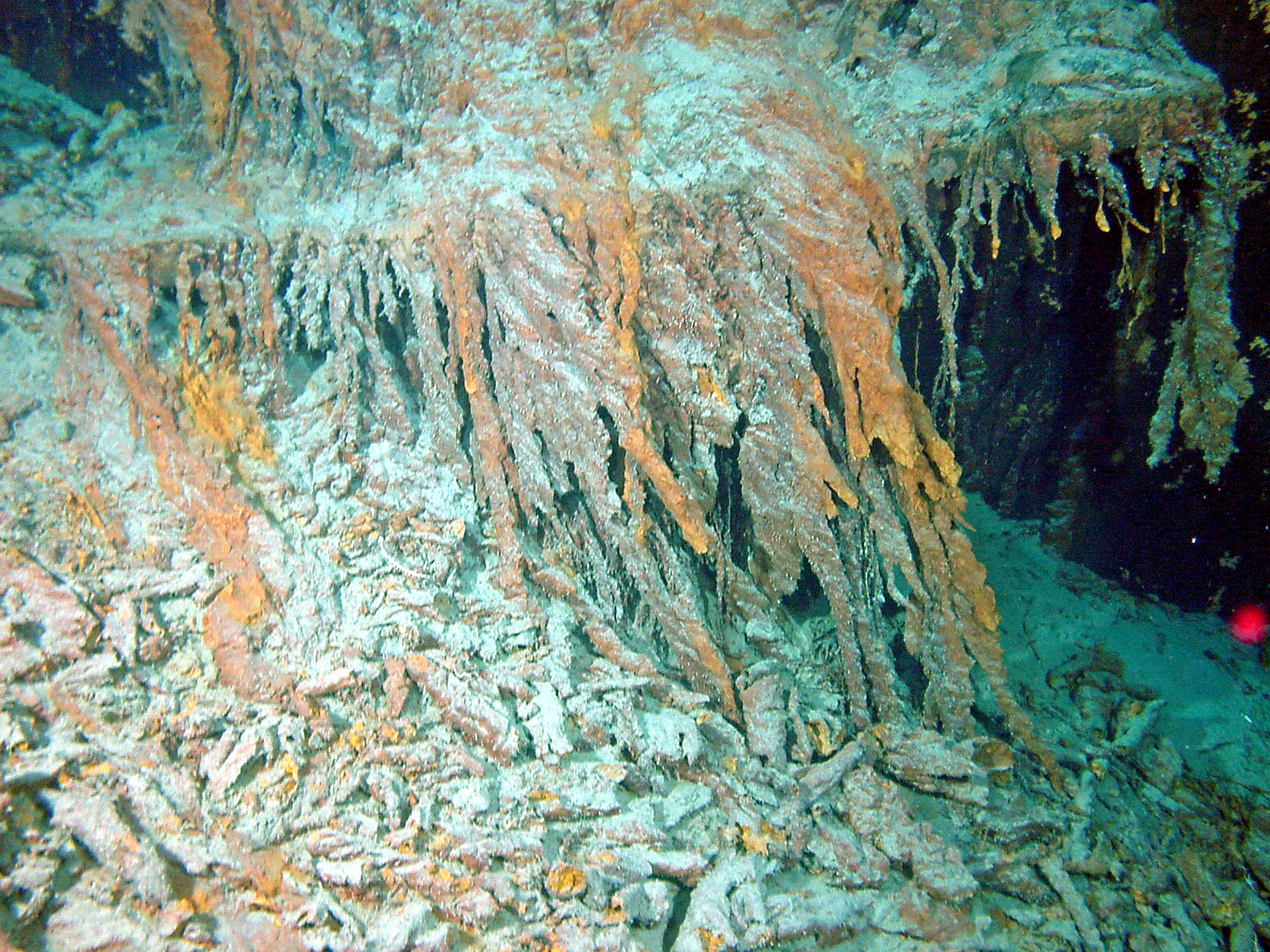
Detached rusticles below port side anchor of the RMS Titanic

A rusticle is a formation of rust similar to an icicle or stalactite in appearance that occurs deep underwater when iron-eating bacteria attack and oxidize wrought iron and steel. They are seen on underwater photographs of shipwrecks, such as the RMS Titanic and the German battleship Bismarck. They have also been found in the #3 8-inch gun turret on the stern of the USS Indianapolis. The word rusticle is a portmanteau of the words rust and icicle and was coined by Robert Ballard, who first observed them on the wreck of the Titanic in 1986. Rusticles on the Titanic were first investigated in 1996 by Roy Cullimore, based at the University of Regina in Canada. A previously unknown species of bacteria living inside the Titanic's rusticles called Halomonas titanicae was discovered in 2010 by Henrietta Mann.

Rusticles can form on any submerged steel object and have been seen on other subsea structures such as mooring chains and subsea equipment. They form more rapidly in warmer climates and can form in water with little to no dissolved oxygen.

== Composition ==
The rusticle consists of up to 35% iron compounds including iron oxides, iron carbonates, and iron hydroxides. Rusticles are found in a tube shapes of iron oxides which are vertical to one another. Rusticles are found to grow at approximately 1 cm (0.39 in) a year and are most often found in areas of sunken hulls underwater.

The remainder of the structure is a complex community of symbiotic or mutualistic microbes including bacteria Halomonas titanicae and fungi that use the rusting metal as a source of food, causing microbial corrosion and collectively producing the mineral compounds that form the rusticle as waste products.

Rusticles have been found to most often be composed of iron, calcium, chloride, magnesium, silica, sodium, and sulfate while there are other chemical compositions of rusticles but in much smaller quantities.

== Structure ==
Structurally, rusticles contain channels which allow water to flow through, and they seem to build up in a ring structure similar to the growth rings of a tree. They are very delicate and can easily disintegrate into fine powder on even the slightest touch.

== Colours ==
The outer surface of a rusticle is smooth red in appearance from the iron(III) oxide, while the core is bright orange due to the presence of crystals of goethite. There are several morphologies of the rusticle, some of which are conical, cylindrical, and rusticle on the seafloor.
