= Sally Ride (disambiguation) =

Sally Ride (1951–2012), the first American woman in space, was an astronaut and physicist.

Sally Ride may also refer to:

- Sally Ride Science, University of California at San Diego, San Diego, California, US
- Sally Ride Elementary School, Orange County Public Schools, Orange County, Florida, US
- S.S. Sally Ride, a space ship, the Cygnus space capsule used on the 2022 CRS mission NG-18 cargo resupply to the International Space Station
- RV Sally Ride (AGOR-28), a Neil Armstrong class research ship of the U.S. Navy
- "Sally Ride" (song), a 2013 song by Janelle Monáe off the album The Electric Lady
- "Ride, Sally, Ride", an alternative name for the song "Mustang Sally"
- Statue of Sally Ride, Cradle of Aviation Museum, Garden City, New York State, US
- Statue of Sally Ride (National Garden of American Heroes), Keystone, South Dakota, US, a proposed statue and statuary garden
- Sally Ride Statue, National Statuary Hall, U.S. Capitol, Washington, D.C., US; a proposed statue
- She Persisted: Sally Ride, a 2021 biography by Atia Abawi about astronaut Sally Ride

== See also ==
- Category:Sally Ride
- Sally (name)
- Sally (disambiguation)
- Ride (disambiguation)
- Ride Sally Ride (disambiguation)
