= RV Sally Ride =

American oceanographic research ship

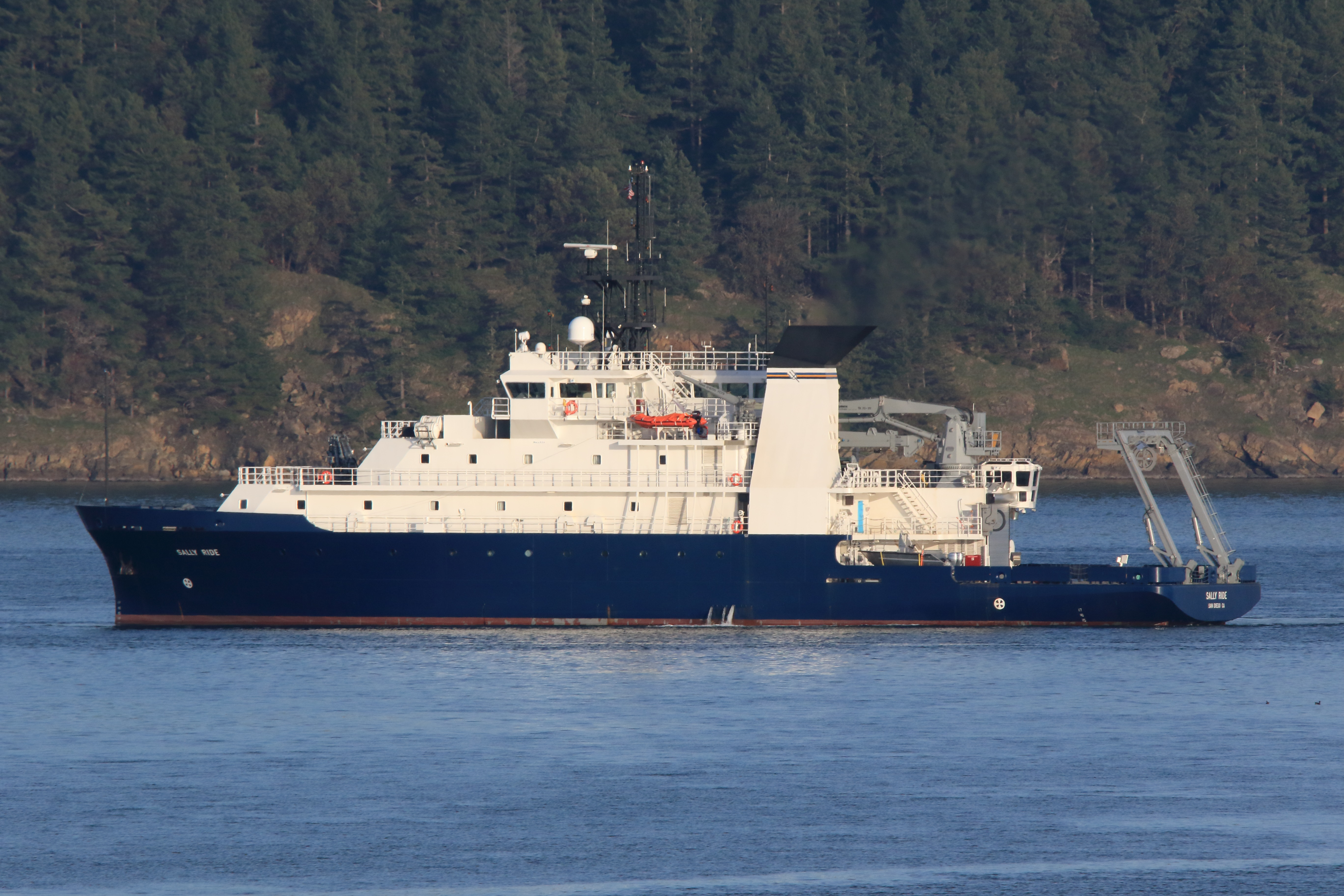
- Sally Ride (AGOR-28) in Padilla Bay, Washington in February 2016

History

United States
- Name: Sally Ride
- Namesake: Sally Ride
- Owner: Office of Naval Research
- Operator: Scripps Institution of Oceanography
- Awarded: February 3, 2012
- Builder: Dakota Creek Industries, Anacortes, Washington
- Laid down: August 31, 2012
- Launched: August 4, 2014
- Acquired: July 1, 2016
- Home port: San Diego, CA
- Identification: IMO number: 9695171; MMSI number: 369140000; Callsign: WSAF
- Status: Delivered

General characteristics
- Class & type: Neil Armstrong-class research vessel
- Tonnage: 2,641 GT
- Displacement: 3,043 long tons (3,092 t)
- Length: 238 ft (73 m)
- Beam: 50 ft (15 m)
- Draft: 15 feet
- Installed power: 2 × Siemens AC electric motors
- Speed: 12 knots (22 km/h; 14 mph) (max)
- Range: 10,545 nmi (19,529 km; 12,135 mi)
- Endurance: 40 days
- Crew: 20 crew + 24 scientists

RV Sally Ride (AGOR-28) is a Neil Armstrong-class research vessel owned by the United States Navy and operated by the Scripps Institution of Oceanography. She was launched in 2014 and put into service in 2016.

The ship was named for Sally Ride, the first US woman in space. Her sister ship, the Neil Armstrong, is operated by the Woods Hole Oceanographic Institution.

== Construction ==
Sally Ride is a commercially designed, monohull research vessel, capable of both coastal and deep ocean oceanography operations. She was constructed by Dakota Creek Industries in Anacortes, Washington, the same builders that constructed the RV Neil Armstrong. She completed her sea trials on February 21, 2016 prior to passing the acceptance trials of the US Navy's Board of Inspection and Survey.

The ship is equipped with cranes and winches for over-the-side loading of research equipment and supplies, as well as accommodations for twenty-four scientists. It is powered by a multi-drive, low-voltage, diesel electric propulsion system for efficiency and lower maintenance and fuel costs. Both Neil Armstrong-class ships have oceanographic equipment allowing deep ocean mapping and information technology for ship monitoring and worldwide land-based communication.

The ship was christened by the U.S. Navy and Sally Ride's life partner Tam O'Shaughnessy in 2014.

== Cruise history ==
In 2018, Sally Ride was used to research sediment plumes associated with deep sea mining. Sailing 50 kilometers (25 nautical miles) off the coast of Southern California, the ship was used to develop special acoustic doppler sonar sensors to monitor sediments pumped out of a pipe and constrain models for ocean policy regarding polymetallic nodules in the Clarion–Clipperton fracture zone.

Sally Ride commonly undertakes work with the California Cooperative Oceanic Fisheries (CalCOFI) program, and in 2020, fielded the first all-female science party. In summer 2024, Sally Ride undertook the 396th CalCOFI cruise – 75 years after the inception of the program.

In 2021, an oceanographic high-resolution mapping survey on the Sally Ride found nearly 27,000 objects in the San Pedro Basin (between the coastline of Long Beach and Catalina Island). High resolution topographical data was provided by two autonomous underwater vehicles, REMUS 6000 and Bluefin. The ROV Jason visually confirmed these objects to be barrels, suspected to contain DDT possibly dumped between 1947 and 1961, though other sources suggest that the basin could have been a dumping ground until the implementation of the Marine Protection, Research and Sanctuaries Act in 1972.

== See also ==
- RV Neil Armstrong – sister ship
- RV Knorr – predecessor to the Neil Armstrong
- RRS James Cook – British equivalent
- RRS Charles Darwin – predecessor to the James Cook
