= Ride Sally Ride =

Ride Sally Ride may refer to:

== Songs ==
- 'Ride, Sally, Ride' (formally called: "Mustang Sally"), a 1965 song by Mack Rice
- "Ride, Sally Ride", a 1971 song by Al Green off the album Al Green Gets Next to You
- "Ride, Sally, Ride", a 1972 song by Dennis Coffey off the album Goin' for Myself
- "Ride Sally Ride", a 1974 song by Lou Reed off the album Sally Can't Dance
- "Ride, Sally Ride!", a 1982 song and single by Casse Culver
- "Let Sally Drive (Ride Sally Ride)", a 2000 song by Sammy Hagar off the album Ten 13, released as a single in 2001; see Sammy Hagar discography

== Other uses ==
- "Ride, Sally, Ride", a 2014 episode of the TV show Scandal season 3
- Ride, Sally Ride: A Photobiography of America's Pioneering Woman in Space, a 2015 biography of astronaut Sally Ride by Tam O'Shaughnessy
- Ride Sally Ride (Sex Rules), a 2020 novel by Douglas Wilson (theologian)

== See also ==
- Sally Ride (disambiguation)
