= Whittard Canyon =

Coordinates: 48.1°N 10.3°W

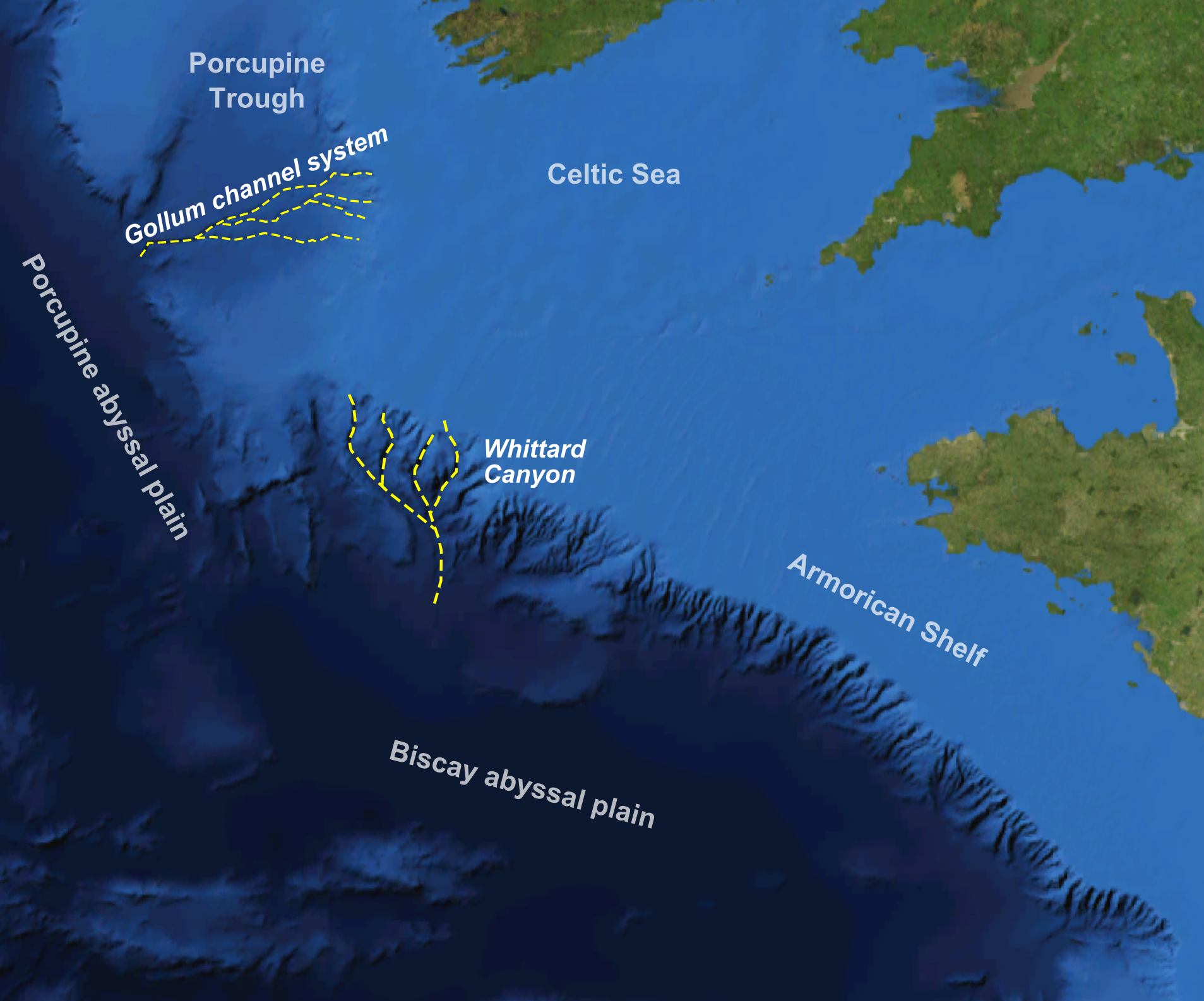
The map of Whittard Canyon

Whittard Canyon is a submarine canyon off the southwest coast of Ireland, located between Celtic Sea and Atlantic Ocean. It covers an area of 2,000 square miles (5,200 km^{2}) and spans over 80 by 20 miles (129 by 32 km), with overall depth below 1,500 m.

The canyon has been the subject of numerous scientific research, ranging from its sediment transport to its biodiversity. In 2015, a group of scientists from NERC's National Oceanography Centre (NOC) on board RRS James Cook studied the canyon for five weeks. During the studies, they found abundant forms of deep-water life, such as blue sharks, swordfishes, cold-water corals, clams, and deep-sea oysters. In this canyon, the coral species can live in darkness and get their food from the passing water, which differed from the tropical corals that need sunlight to survive.

Another expedition team from NIOZ also studied that layers with high concentrations of suspended particles in the canyon, known as nepheloid layers, contribute significantly to the transport of matter that formed a good condition for the high diversity of the canyon's fauna.

== See also ==
- Porcupine Seabight

== Sources ==
- Amaro, Teresa; Huvenne, Veerle A.I.; Allcock, A. Louise; Aslam, Tahmeena; Davies, Jaime S.; Danovaro, Roberto; De Stigter, Henko C.; Duineveld, Gérard C.A.; Gambi, Cristina; Gooday, Andrew J.; Gunton, Laetitia M.; Hall, Rob A.; Howell, Kerry L.; Ingels, Jeroen; Kiriakoulakis, Konstadinos; Kershaw, C.E.; Lavaleye, Marc S.S.; Robert, Katleen; Stewart, Heather; Van Rooij, David; White, Martin A.; Wilson, Annette M. (2016). "The Whittard Canyon – A case study of submarine canyon processes" (PDF). Progress in Oceanography. 146: 38–57. Bibcode:2016PrOce.146...38A. doi:10.1016/j.pocean.2016.06.003.
