= RV Knorr =

Research vessel

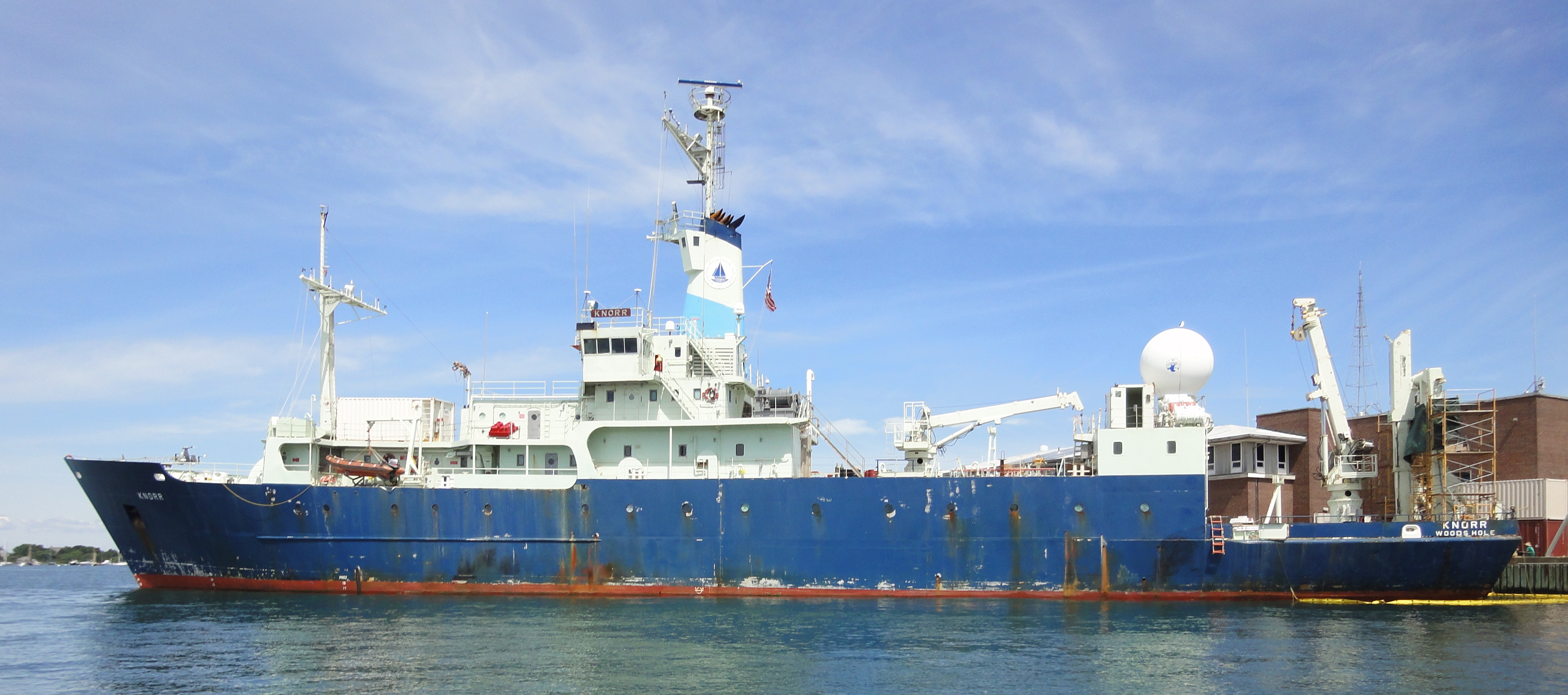
- The R/V Knorr

History

United States
- Launched: August 21, 1968
- Acquired: April 15, 1970 (delivered to Woods Hole Oceanographic Institution)
- In service: 1970
- Out of service: 2016
- Renamed: Rio Tecolutla
- Home port: Woods Hole, Massachusetts
- Identification: IMO number: 7738618; Callsign: XCWM
- Fate: Transferred to Mexican Navy, 14 March 2016

General characteristics
- Type: Research vessel
- Tonnage: 2,518 GT
- Displacement: 2,685 long tons
- Length: 279 ft (85 m)
- Beam: 46 ft (14 m)
- Draught: 16 ft 6 in (5.03 m)
- Installed power: 3 × 1,100 kW (1,500 hp); 1 × 560 kW (750 hp)
- Propulsion: 2 × Lips electric azimuth thrusters (2 × 1,500 shp); Lips retractable azimuth bow thruster (900 shp)
- Speed: 11 knots (20 km/h; 13 mph)
- Range: 12,000 nautical miles (22,000 km)
- Endurance: 60 days
- Complement: 22 crew; 32 scientists; 2 technicians
- Sensors & processing systems: Side-scan sonar

RV Knorr was a research vessel formerly owned by the U.S. Navy and operated by the Woods Hole Oceanographic Institution for the U.S. research community in coordination with and as a part of the University-National Oceanographic Laboratory System (UNOLS) fleet. On March 14, 2016, Knorr was officially transferred to the Mexican Navy and renamed Rio Tecolutla. She was replaced at Woods Hole by the RV Neil Armstrong. Knorr is best known as the ship that supported researchers as they discovered the wreck of the RMS Titanic in 1985. R/V Knorr (AGOR-15) has traveled more than a million miles—the rough equivalent of two round trips to the Moon or forty trips around the Earth. Her sister ship is the RV Melville.

== Ship ==
R/V Knorr was named in honor of Ernest R. Knorr, a distinguished hydrographic engineer and cartographer who was appointed Chief Engineer Cartographer of the U.S. Navy Hydrographic office in 1860. Chief Engineer Knorr was one of the leaders of the Navy’s first systematic charting and surveying effort from 1860 to 1885. She was launched on August 21, 1968 at the Defoe Shipbuilding Company in Bay City, Michigan, Knorr was delivered to Woods Hole on April 15, 1970.

The ship was built with Cycloidal propulsion that was replaced during a 1989-1991 midlife refit at which time propulsion was changed to two azimuthing stern thrusters and a retractable bow thruster as well as the hull being lengthened from 246 ft (75.0 m) to 279 ft (85.0 m). The overhaul between 1989 and 1991 added 34 feet (10 m) of length to her midsection.

In 2003 a Dynamic Positioning System capable of holding the ship in position within one meter was installed providing capability for ocean drilling and other precise operations. During a 2005–2006 refit a 25,000 pounds (11,000 kg) long coring system capable of 150 ft (45.7 m), longest in the U.S. research fleet, deep cores was installed.

The ship has anti-roll tanks and an ice-strengthened bow enabling her to work in all of the world’s oceans. She can take a crew of 22 and a scientific party of 34 to sea for as long as 60 days. Knorr was designed to accommodate a wide range of oceanographic tasks, with two instrument hangars and eight scientific work areas; a fully equipped machine shop; three oceanographic winches; and two cranes. Knorr is equipped with sophisticated navigation and satellite communication systems, as well as a dynamic positioning system that allows the ship to move in any direction and to maintain a fixed position in high winds and rough seas.

In 2005–2006, the ship was refitted to support a new “long-coring” system that can extract 150-foot (46 m) plugs of ancient sediments from the sea floor. Weighing nearly 25,000 pounds, the new piston-coring system is the longest in the U.S. research fleet (twice as long as existing systems). Knorr and its long-corer will allow scientists to sample deep, ancient sediments that are rich with historical information about the ocean and climate.

== Role in search for Thresher, Scorpion, and Titanic ==
In 1985, operated by the Woods Hole Oceanographic Institution, she was the ship that discovered the wreck of the RMS Titanic, using side scan sonar.

The U.S. Navy was interested in finding out what happened to their missing nuclear powered attack submarines, the USS Scorpion and the USS Thresher, which sank in the 1960s. Robert Ballard approached the Navy about using his new deep sea underwater robot craft, the Argo, to search for the Titanic. The Navy agreed it would finance use of the RV Knorr for Ballard's Titanic search only if he first searched for and investigated the two sunken submarines, and found out the state of their nuclear reactors after being submerged for such a long time, and whether their radioactivity was impacting the environment. When they searched for the two submarines, Ballard and his team discovered that they had imploded from the immense pressure at depth. It littered thousands of pieces of debris all over the ocean floor. Following the large trail of debris led them directly to both and made it significantly easier for them to locate them than if they were to search for the hulls directly. Using that lesson, they had Argo sweep back and forth across the ocean floor to find the Titanic's debris trail, following the trail to the wreckage of the ship itself.

== Decommissioning ==
It was announced on December 4, 2014, that the research vessel Knorr was being decommissioned after more than 40 years as the workhorse of the Woods Hole Oceanographic Institution research fleet. The ship's last full research cruise, with Chief Science Officer Richard W. Murray, was completed in December 2014. Knorr was transferred to the Mexican Navy in 2016, and was replaced by a new $74 million research vessel, the RV Neil Armstrong.

== Specifications ==
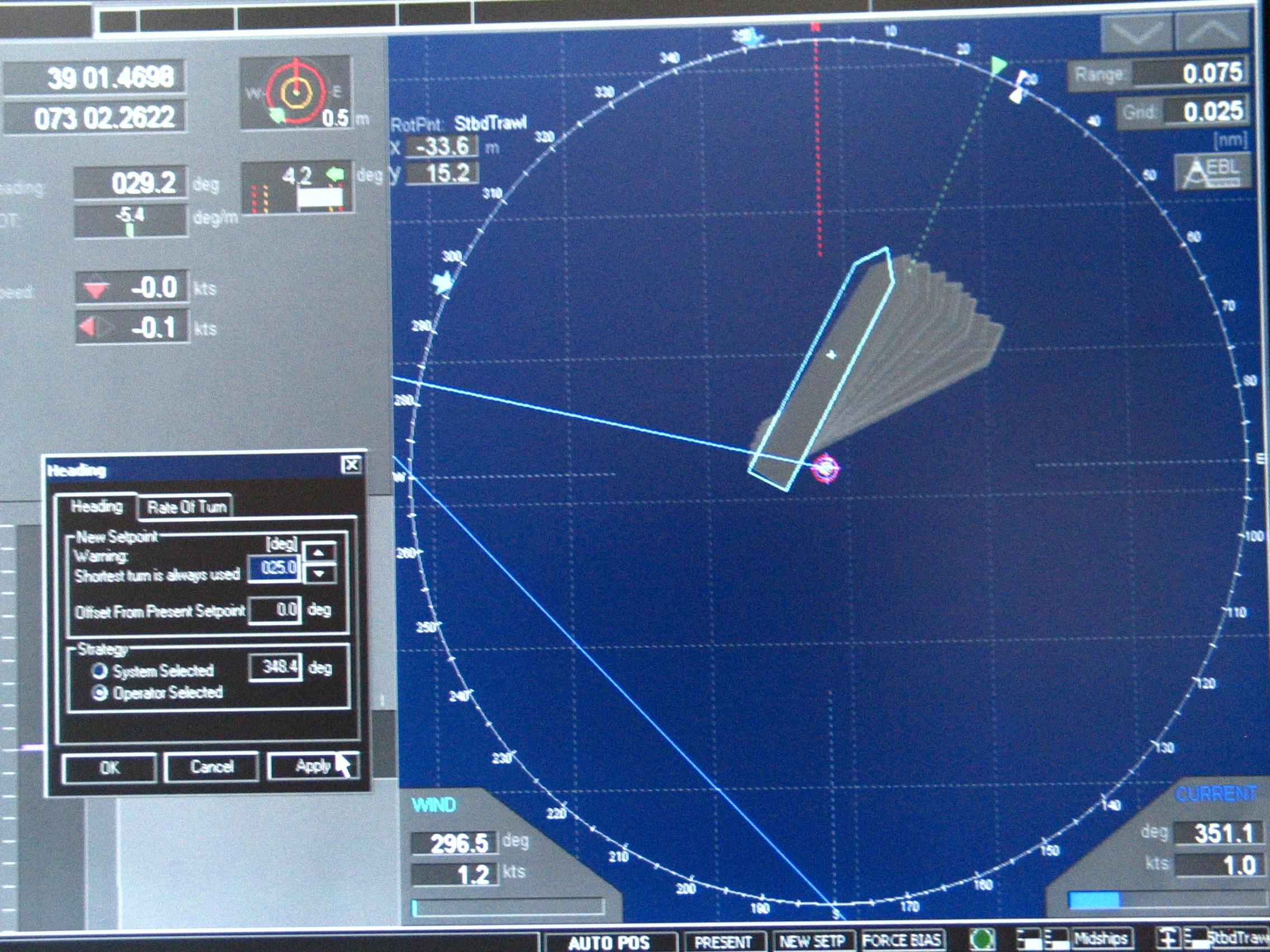
The dynamic positioning display on the R/V Knorr while it holds position, rotating about the end of her trawl-winch crane.

- Built: 1969
- Length: 279 feet (85 m)
- Draft: 16.5 feet (5 m), with bow thruster lowered – 23 ft (7 m)
- Displacement: 2,685 LT
- Range: 12,000 NM
- Laboratories: 2,756 sq. feet (256 sq. m)
- Speed: 11.0 knots cruising
- Endurance: 60 days
- Fuel Capacity: 160,500 gallons
- Mid-Life Overhaul: 1989–1991
- Beam: 46 feet (14 m)
- Gross Tons: 2,518 T
- Complement:
  - Crew – 22
  - Scientists – 32
  - Technicians – 2
- Propulsion: Two Lips diesel-electric azimuthing stern thrusters, 1500 SHP each
- Bow Thruster: Lips retractable azimuthing 900 SHP
- Ship Service Generators: 3 @ 1,110 KW 600 VAC, 1 @ 560 KW 600 VAC
- Portable Van Space: At least six 20-ft. vans
- Winches:
  - Trawl – 30,000' 9/16" wire
  - Hydro (2) – 30,000' 3-cond. EM or 1/4" wire
- Heavy Equipment:
  - Cranes – two 60,000 lbs. capacity
  - Midships hydro boom
  - HIAB crane
- Sewage System:
  - 3,600 gallons/day
  - 7,000 gal. holding capacity

Ownership: Title held by U.S. Navy; Operated under charter agreement with Office of Naval Research

Other Features: Two instrument hangars, fully equipped machine shop, dynamic-positioning system, four transducer wells, one rigid-hull inflatable rescue/work boat.

== See also ==
- RRS James Cook – British equivalent
- RRS Charles Darwin – Predecessor to the James Cook
