= RV Neil Armstrong =

US Navy research ship, launched 2014

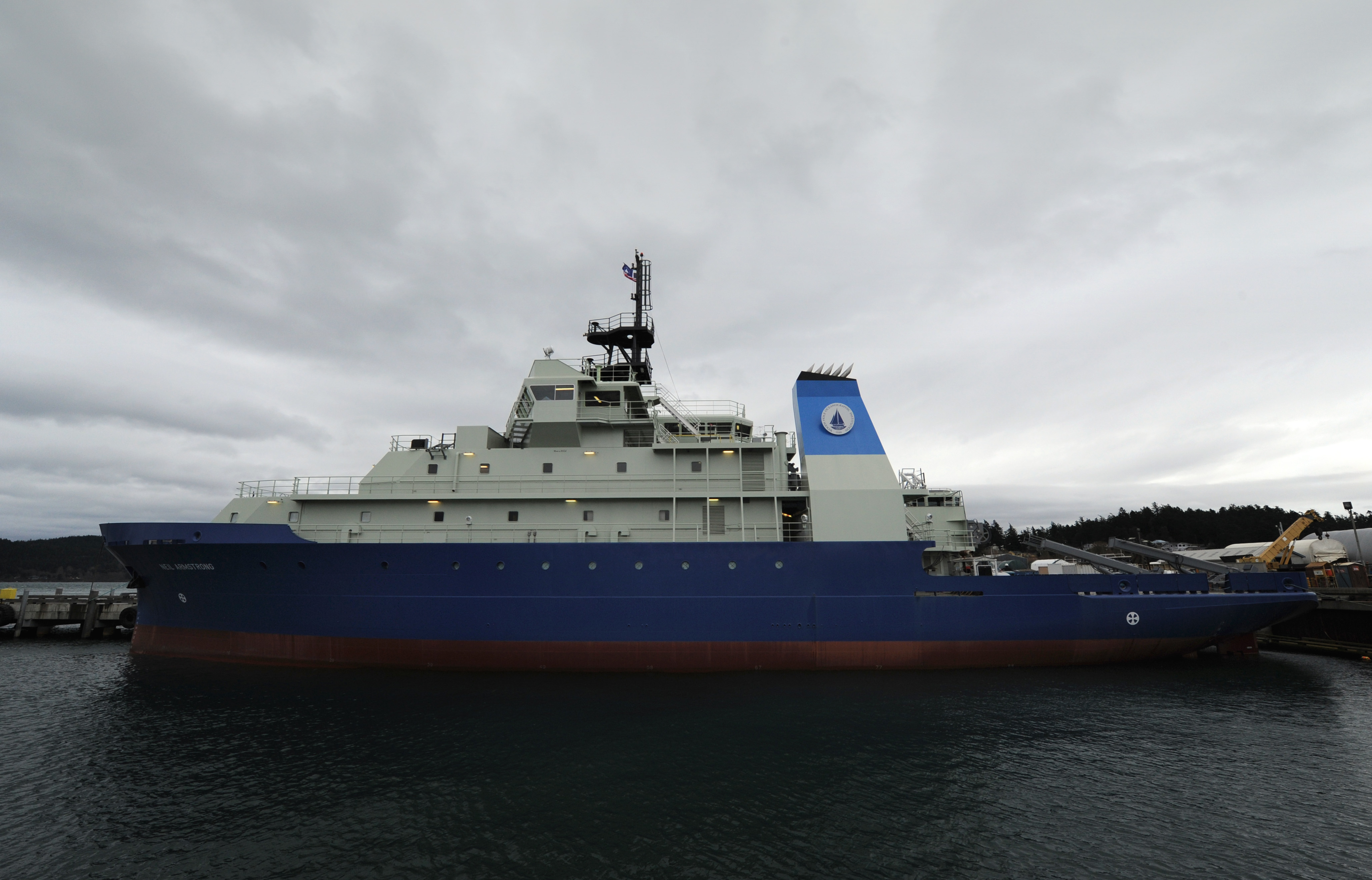
- Neil Armstrong on 28 March 2014, the day before her christening

History

United States
- Name: Neil Armstrong
- Namesake: Neil Armstrong
- Owner: Office of Naval Research
- Operator: Woods Hole Oceanographic Institution
- Ordered: October 14, 2010
- Builder: Dakota Creek Industries, Anacortes, Washington
- Laid down: August 17, 2012
- Launched: February 22, 2014
- Acquired: September 23, 2015
- Identification: IMO number: 9688946; MMSI number: 338767000; Callsign: WARL
- Status: in active service

General characteristics
- Class & type: Neil Armstrong-class research vessel
- Displacement: 3043 long tons
- Length: 238 ft (73 m)
- Beam: 50 ft (15 m)
- Draft: 15 feet
- Installed power: (x2) Siemens AC Electric Motors
- Speed: 12 knots (22 km/h; 14 mph) (max)
- Range: 10,545 nautical miles (19,529 km; 12,135 mi)
- Endurance: 40 Days
- Crew: 20 Crew + 24 Scientists

RV Neil Armstrong (AGOR-27) is the designation for a new oceanographic research ship, first of the Neil Armstrong-class research vessels, to be owned by the United States Navy and operated by Woods Hole Oceanographic Institution. Secretary of the Navy Ray Mabus announced on September 24, 2012, that the research vessel was to be named after Neil Armstrong, the first person to walk on the Moon and a former naval aviator who served in the Korean War.

The ship was ordered in May 2010 as a replacement for RV Knorr, operated by Woods Hole Oceanographic Institution since 1970. The ship was constructed by Dakota Creek Industries of Anacortes, Washington and scheduled for completion in 2014 for entry into service in 2015.

It was launched on 29 March 2014, christened by Carol Armstrong, passed sea trials 7 August 2015 and delivered to the Navy on 23 September 2015. A sister ship, RV Sally Ride (AGOR-28), was launched 9 August 2014 to be operated by Scripps Institution of Oceanography under a renewable charter-party agreement.

== Construction ==
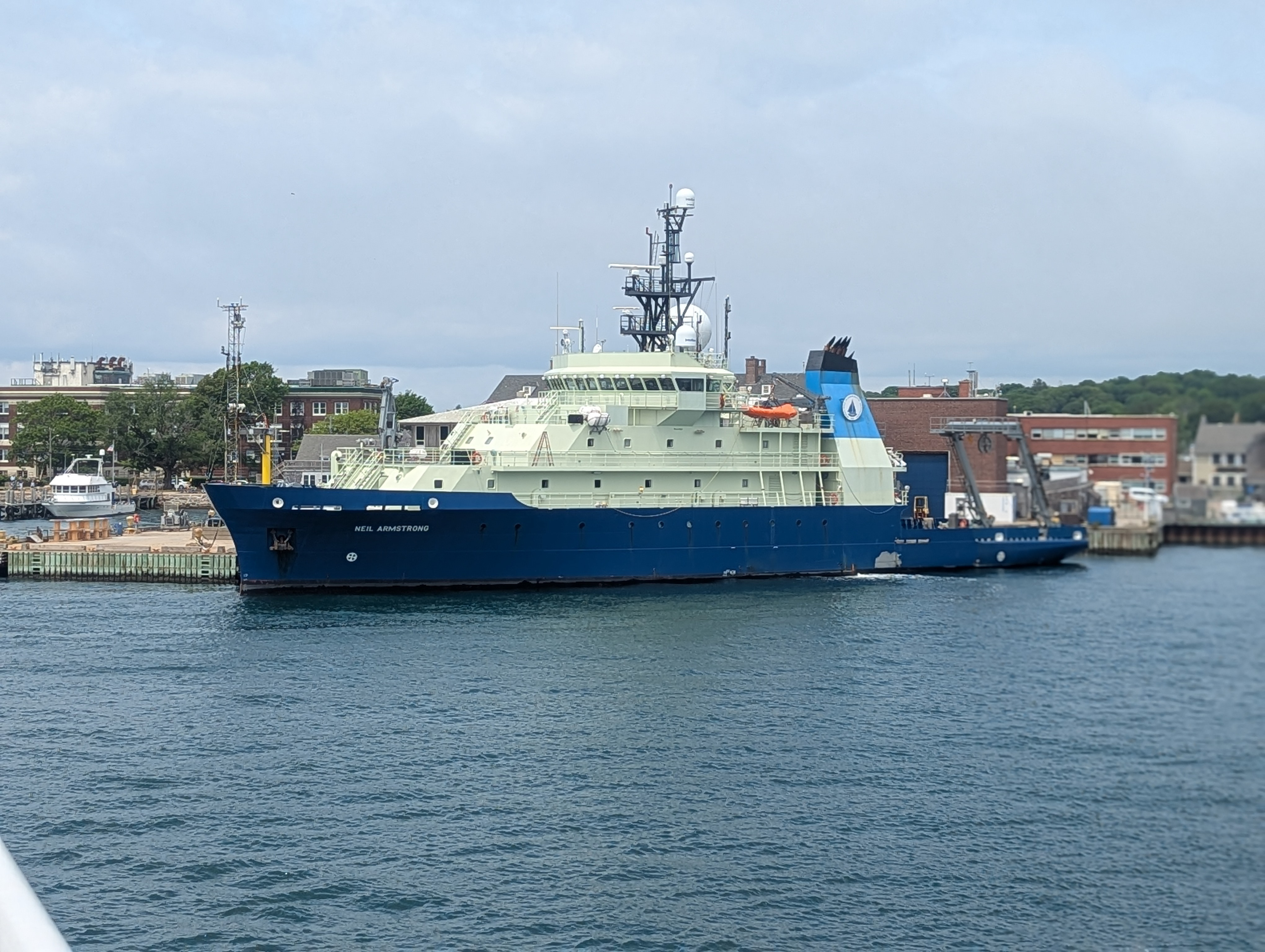
Docked in Woods Hole in 2024.

Neil Armstrong is a commercially designed mono hull research vessel, capable of coastal and deep ocean oceanography operations, and equipped with cranes and winches for over-the-side loading of research equipment and supplies, as well as accommodations for twenty-four scientists. The ship is powered by a multi-drive low-voltage diesel electric propulsion system for efficiency and lower maintenance and fuel costs. Both Neil Armstrong-class ships have state of the art oceanographic equipment allowing deep ocean mapping and information technology for ship monitoring and worldwide land-based communication.

== Labs ==
Neil Armstrong has more than 130 square meters of adjustable lab space, supplied by a flash evaporation desalination system.

== See also ==
- RV Sally Ride - Sister Ship
- Oscar Dyson class fisheries research ship - Parent design from which the Neil Armstrong class was derived.
- RV Knorr - Predecessor to the Neil Armstrong
- RRS James Cook - British equivalent
- RRS Charles Darwin - Predecessor to the James Cook
