= Fred Hargadon =

- Born: January 4, 1934; Ardmore, Pennsylvania
- Died: January 15, 2014 (aged 80); Princeton, New Jersey
- Occupation: Dean of Admissions
- Employers: Swarthmore College (1964-1969); Stanford University (1969-1984); College Board (1984-1988); Princeton University (1988-2003)

Fred Hargadon (January 4, 1934 – January 15, 2014) was the Dean of Admissions at Swarthmore College from 1964-1969, Stanford University from 1969 to 1984, and Princeton University from 1988 to 2003. He was a national leader in the field of university and college admission. In 1984 The New York Times described him as "the dean of deans".

== Early life ==
Frederick Anthony Hargadon was born in Ardmore, Pennsylvania, the son of Bernard and Anna Hargadon. He had two brothers, Bernard and John, and two sisters, Anne and Judy. He attended Lower Merion High School, and worked for the post office, where he had held odd jobs since he was 14 years old, and for the Atlantic Refining Company for two years. He served in the U.S. Army for two years, and then went to Haverford College under the G. I. Bill of Rights. He graduated in 1958, and did postgraduate work at Harvard University and Cornell University. He then became a political science professor at Swarthmore College.

== Swarthmore ==
In 1964, Hargadon became the Dean of Admissions at Swarthmore College, where he set about reforming the admissions system.

That year, Swarthmore received a US $275,000 grant (equivalent to $2,788,000 in 2024) from the Rockefeller Foundation to improve its efforts to recruit and enroll African American students, particularly male ones. The grant was primarily intended to provide financial aid to such students. Up until 1953, Swarthmore had enrolled 7 or 8 African-American students; in the decade that followed, another 20 were enrolled. Between 1964 and 1968, Hargadon managed to enroll 61 African-American students out of a total of about 1100 enrollments in this period. Given the quality of the students, it was likely that they would have otherwise gone to college elsewhere, but Swarthmore did establish itself as a college that prospective African-American students would consider. Because women were more likely to take up an offer of a place, almost twice as many African-American women were enrolled as men, which was the opposite of what was intended. Moreover, the number of African-American students requiring financial aid was much lower than anticipated, as many had preeixsting means of payment or other scholarships.

== Stanford ==
Hargadon moved on to Stanford University in 1969. He drove around in a convertible with the license plate "ADMITS". He instituted a holistic evaluation of students under which admission was not merely based on academic credentials. One candidate who answered the question "Is there anything else you would like to tell us?" with "My test scores are low. They are accurate" was admitted and subsequently did well. "We were more likely to look for the youngster who has written a lot of term papers," he told a reporter. "I like to consider their energy level." He knew each student by name, and wrote personal, handwritten notes on their acceptance letters, which started with "Yes!" When a bag of mail containing acceptance letters for the class of 1978 went astray at the post office, he sent each an apology letter with a handwritten "Ouch!" at the top. He was a frequent guest at gatherings in dorms.

Although less than 100 years old, by 1984, Stanford had become one of the most exclusive universities in the United States, accepting only 17.1 percent of applicants, whereas the much older Harvard University accepted 18.3 percent. While Harvard refused to accept more than 50 or 60 transfers from other universities each year, Stanford admitted up to 200, one of whom was future astronaut Sally Ride. Hargadon noted that while earlier generations of students had seldom attended universities more than 200 miles (320 km) from their home, by the 1990s students were increasingly considering universities around the nation and overseas. By 1984, only 42.3 percent of Stanford's freshman class was from California.

"I sometimes have a nightmare," he told a reporter from The New Yorker magazine, "in which 5,000 undergraduates are running around the campus opening 5,000 doors all labeled 'Who Am I?'" He felt that part of the problem was that universities had been oversold. He encouraged students to consider what they wanted to do at university, and not just what they wanted to do afterwards. He abolished personal interviews of applicants. "I'm not a believer in one-on-one interviews with self-conscious 17-year- olds," he explained, "The brightest person I've ever admitted uttered about 10 words. I'm wary of taking snapshots of kids at that point." He felt that it was better to evaluate them through their application forms. He believed in diversity, and was proud that the last class he admitted to Stanford was contained 9 percent Black and 9 percent Hispanic. He noted that "the block one is born on is still the most determining factor in one's education", and expressed the hope that one day there would be a common core curriculum in high schools across the nation.

In 1984 he left Stanford to become senior vice president of the College Board.

== Princeton ==
He became dean of admissions at Princeton University in 1988. As dean, he read 207,900 applications, and sent his 'YES!' letters to 17,400 of them.

In 2002, Stephen LeMenager, Princeton's associate dean of admissions, used the social security numbers of prospective Princeton students for unauthorized access to Yale University's admissions website, which required neither user IDs nor passwords. Hardagon accepted responsibility for what had occurred, and announced that he would retire in June 2003. LeMenager was suspended, but later given another position at Princeton.

Hargadon died at his home in Princeton, New Jersey, on January 15, 2014. He was survived by his two sons, four siblings, and five grandchildren. Hargadon Hall, a dormitory at Whitman College, Princeton University, was named after him. The word "YES!" is carved in stone out the front. His papers are held by Swarthmore College.
