= Richard W. Murray =

American geologist and oceanographer

- Alma mater: Hamilton College; University of California, Berkeley
- Employer: Boston University (1992–2019); National Science Foundation (2015–2018); Woods Hole Oceanographic Institution (2019–)
- Parent(s): Joseph E. Murray

External videos
- “Dr. Rick Murray on Wide Range of Perspectives Needed to Combat Climate Change”, Urban Coast Institute, April 18, 2023.

Richard W. Murray, known as Rick Murray, an American geologist and oceanographer, is the Deputy Director and Vice President for Research at Woods Hole Oceanographic Institution (WHOI) in Woods Hole, Massachusetts. Murray was previously a professor of earth and environment at Boston University (1992-2019), where he served as Chair of the Department of Earth Sciences (2000-2005), and Director of Boston University's Marine Program (2006-2009).

Murray also served as Director of the Division of Ocean Sciences at the National Science Foundation (2015-2018). He was co-chair of the Subcommittee on Ocean Science and Technology for the Office of Science and Technology Policy in the Executive Office of the President under the Obama and Trump administrations. He is an elected Fellow of the Geological Society of America.

== Early life and education ==
Rick Murray is a son of surgeon Joseph Murray, Murray graduated from Hamilton College in Clinton, Oneida County, New York in 1985 with a B.A. in Geology. He also completed the SEA (Sea Education Association) program at Woods Hole (Class W-71) in 1983. He credits the program with figuring "prominently in my personal and professional growth".

He then attended the University of California at Berkeley, receiving his Ph.D. in Geology in 1991, before accepting a post-doctoral fellowship at the Graduate School of Oceanography of the University of Rhode Island.

== Career ==
Murray joined Boston University as a professor of earth and environment in 1992. He served as Chair of the Department of Earth Sciences from 2000-2005, and Director of Boston University's Marine Program from 2006-2009. From 2015-2018, he took a leave from BU to serve as Director of the Division of Ocean Sciences at the National Science Foundation. As of September 1, 2019, he became Deputy Director and Vice President for Research at Woods Hole Oceanographic Institution (WHOI) in Woods Hole, Massachusetts.

A geochemist and volcanologist, Murray studies marine geochemistry, collecting and examining marine sediments for chemical evidence of events such as climate change and volcanism. He uses sedimentary evidence to study topics including volcanism, the dispersal of volcanic ash, climate change, and oceanographic processes in the subseafloor biosphere. Before core samples can be extracted from the sea floor, possible sites must be reviewed in terms of scientific, engineering, and safety issues. This competitive process can take as much as five years. Teams of investigators must then wait to be allocated time on a suitable ship. A drill team extracts core samples by connecting continuous lengths of pipe that extend to the sea floor and then drilling down hundreds of meters into the Earth’s crust. The ship must stay fixed in its location for days or weeks to extract core samples. The oceanic sediments in a core sample can date back millions of years. Layers of sediment are examined for chemical and isotopic clues indicative of dust, pollen, volcanic ash, runoff from rivers, microbes, and plankton. In some cases, concentrations are measured in parts-per-trillion. Components of pore water such as the concentrations of metals and nutrients and alkalinity also provide clues to the climate and conditions in effect when a sediment layer was deposited. Oceanic core samples are eventually archived in long-term storage facilities at 4°C, available for further study of the geologic and climate record.

As a seagoing oceanographer, Murray has taken part in scientific ocean research cruises in different parts of the world, staying at sea for up to two months at a time. He was Co-Chief Scientist of the JOIDES Resolution in 2013, on an expedition to drill for ocean core samples and study the East Asian Monsoon weather system. His work was funded by the National Science Foundation as part of the International Ocean Discovery Program (IODP). He was Chief Science Officer on the last full research cruise of the R/V Knorr in 2014, taking core samples from the ocean floor of the North Atlantic.

Murray has published nearly 100 peer-reviewed research papers. He was elected a fellow of the Geological Society of America in 1999. He has held leadership positions in the Sea Education Association (SEA, trustee), American Geophysical Union (AGU, board of directors), The Oceanography Society (TOS, councilor, ethics committee chair), and the Society for Women in Marine Science (SWMS, board member).

Murray was co-chair of the Subcommittee on Ocean Science and Technology for the Office of Science and Technology Policy in the Executive Office of the President under the Obama and Trump administrations. In 2020 he testified before Congress, emphasizing the importance of oceans to climate, weather, the economy and national security. He has called for funding of observation and quantitative data collection of the ocean, “to improve climate and weather predictions and our ability to make difficult decisions about how we manage the future.” As of 2021, the National Science Foundation announced funding for a new Science and Technology Center at WHOI, the Center for Chemical Currencies of a Microbial Planet (C-CoMP), to study elemental transfer of molecules "within marine microbial communities and between the ocean and atmosphere". Murray is a member of the Committee on 2025-2035 Decadal Survey of Ocean Sciences for the National Science Foundation.
