= Sally Ride Science =

Nonprofit run by the University of California, San Diego

- Founded: 2001
- Founder: Sally Ride, Tam O'Shaughnessy, Karen Flammer, Terry McEntee, Alann Lopes
- Country of origin: United States
- Headquarters location: San Diego, California
- Official website: www.sallyridescience.com

Sally Ride Science at UC San Diego is a nonprofit science education organization operated by the University of California, San Diego, focused science, technology, engineering, and math (STEM) literacy among K–12 students and educators.

The organization was founded in 2001 by astronaut Sally Ride and collaborators Tam O'Shaughnessy, Karen Flammer, Terry McEntee, and Alann Lopes.

Sally Ride Science was relaunched as a non-profit at UC San Diego on October 1, 2015.

== History ==
Sally Ride Science was founded in 2001 as a company by astronaut Sally Ride, along with Tam O'Shaughnessy, Karen Flammer, Terry McEntee, and Alann Lopes, with the goal of increasing interest and participation in STEM fields among young people.

The organization developed out of Ride's earlier science education initiatives in the 1990s, when she researched contributing factors to lower participation in STEM fields. She began planning educational outreach programs and creating educational materials aimed at increasing student interest.

Sally Ride Science was relaunched as a nonprofit program at the University of California, San Diego on October 1, 2015. It is based at UC San Diego Extension, and its programs are coordinated jointly by UC San Diego Extension, Scripps Institution of Oceanography, and San Diego Supercomputer Center. Currently Tam O'Shaughnessy serves as executive director and Karen Flammer is director of education.

== Programs ==
Sally Ride Science at UC San Diego focuses on professional development for teachers; K-12 STEM + Arts (STEAM) education, including courses, lectures, and camps; and online programs through UCTV. The goal is to help educators build students’ STEM literacy and make connections between what students are learning and the STEM fields that are expected to experience rapid job growth in the coming decades. The nonprofit will create new programs and make use of existing Sally Ride Science programs.

Existing programs include Cool Careers in STEM, which provides professional development for teachers and classroom resources (student books, teacher guides, and a STEM Career Connections Teacher Activity Guide) to awaken students’ interest in STEM topics and careers. Research shows that learning about STEM careers and the diverse people working in these fields inspires students and makes the study of science, technology, engineering, and math more meaningful to them.

Another major existing program is Key Concepts in Science. This integrated standards-based program provides professional development for educators on how to teach science using the 5E instructional model, along with classroom resources (student books, hands-on investigations, teacher guides, and assessments) that educators can use to build students’ STEM literacy and college and career readiness. The program reflects research showing that teaching fewer science concepts in greater depth gives students a solid foundation to develop STEM literacy.

== Activities ==
Before its acquisition by UC San Diego, Sally Ride Science implemented a variety of STEM-related educational initiatives.
