= Tam O'Shaughnessy =

American educator, writer and former tennis player (born 1952)

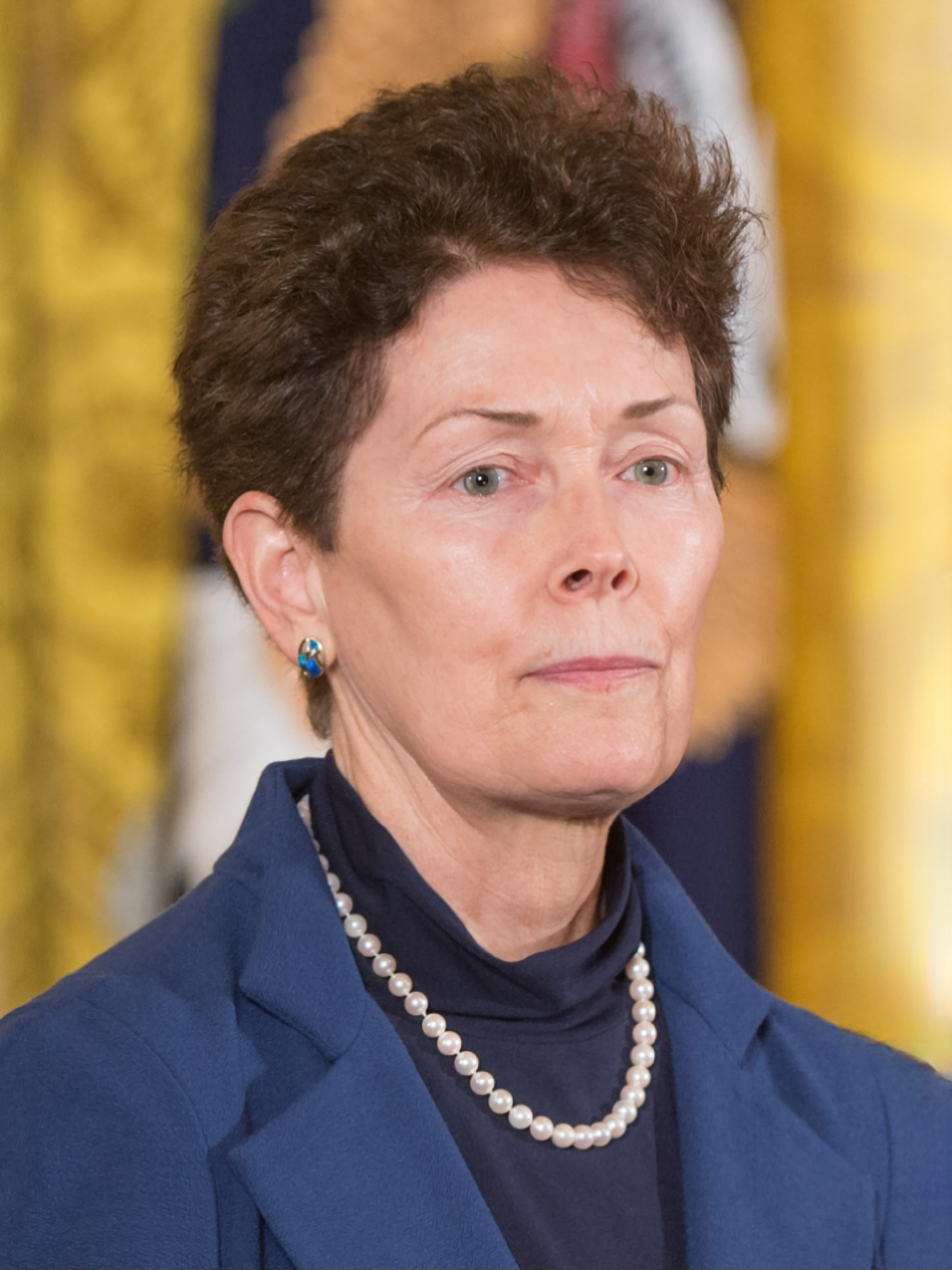
- O'Shaughnessy in 2013
- Born: Tam Elizabeth O'Shaughnessy; January 27, 1952 (age 74); San Andreas, California, U.S.
- Education: Georgia State University (BS, MS); University of California, Riverside (PhD)
- Partner: Sally Ride (1985–2012; Ride's death)

Tam Elizabeth O'Shaughnessy (born January 27, 1952) is an American children's science writer, associate professor emeritus of school psychology, and former professional tennis player. She co-founded the science education company Sally Ride Science together with her life partner, astronaut Sally Ride – the third woman and first American woman in space. The company was relaunched as a nonprofit entity, Sally Ride Science at UC San Diego, on October 1, 2015. O'Shaughnessy serves as executive director.

== Childhood and pro tennis career ==
O'Shaughnessy was born in San Andreas, California, and attended Troy High School in Fullerton, California, where she was active in tennis. As a junior player, she was coached by Billie Jean King.

=== Tennis ===
O'Shaughnessy went on to play on the women's professional tennis circuit from 1971 to 1974. She competed in the U.S. National Championships (now known as the U.S. Open) in 1966, 1970, and 1972.

O'Shaughnessy was coached by Dr. Robert Walter Johnson, a physician who played a key role in the tennis careers of Althea Gibson and Arthur Ashe. Johnson was an official of the American Tennis Association (ATA), an organization that promotes tennis for African Americans but welcomed players of all backgrounds. During the summer of 1966, O'Shaughnessy, who is not African American, competed in ATA tournaments in addition to U.S. Tennis Association junior events. She won the ATA national 18-and-under championship, and so was automatically entered into the U.S. National Championship draw.

O'Shaughnessy also competed in the 1972 Wimbledon Championships. During her tennis career, she was ranked as high as No. 52 in the world in women's singles by the Women's Tennis Association and as high as No. 6 in the U.S. in women's doubles (with Ann Lebedeff) by the USTA. O'Shaughnessy won national hard-court doubles titles in the junior division (with Ann Lebedeff) and in the women's division (with Pam Austin).

After retiring from tennis, O'Shaughnessy was the founding publisher of the Women's Tennis Association newsletter for several years before going to college to study biology.

== Science educator ==
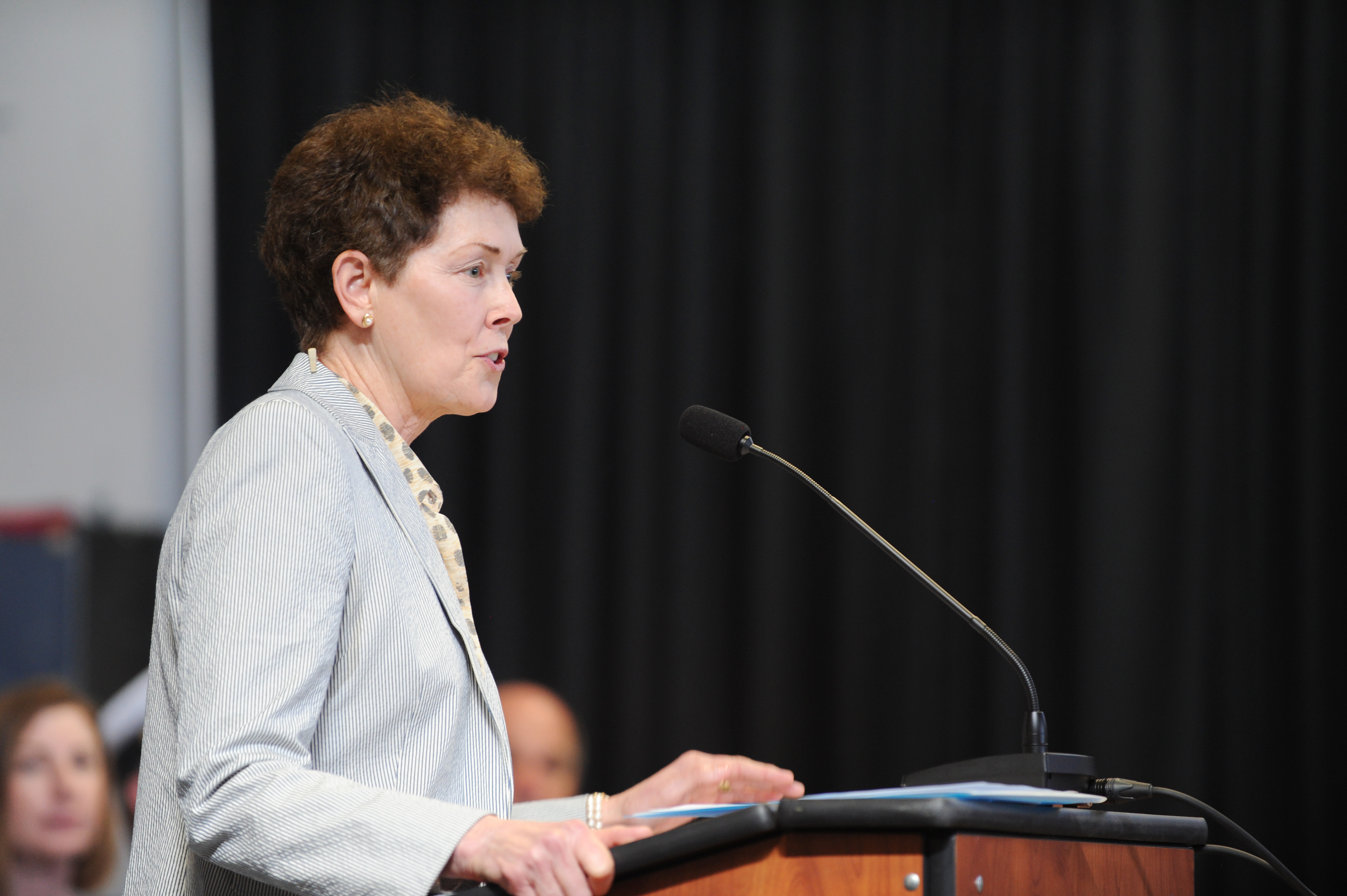
O'Shaughnessy giving remarks at christening ceremony for the research vessel (R/V) Sally Ride

O'Shaughnessy earned B.S. and M.S. degrees in biology from Georgia State University and a Ph.D. in school psychology from the University of California, Riverside. She was assistant professor of school psychology at Georgia State University from 1998 through 2001, and then associate professor of school psychology at San Diego State University from 2002 until 2007. O'Shaughnessy's research on preventive interventions for children with reading difficulties was continuously funded by the U.S. Department of Education starting in graduate school. She retired early to concentrate on Sally Ride Science, and was named associate professor emeritus at San Diego State University.

O'Shaughnessy has extensive experience cultivating girls' and boys' interest in reading, math, and science. Besides being a former science teacher, O'Shaughnessy has written 12 children's science books, including six with Sally Ride. They received the American Institute of Physics Children's Science Writing Award in 1995 for their second book, The Third Planet: Exploring the Earth From Space. In October 2015, O'Shaughnessy published a children's biography of Ride, Sally Ride: A Photobiography of America's Pioneering Woman in Space. The book combines reminiscences from Ride's family and friends with photos, including many family and personal photos.

As a scientist and educator, O'Shaughnessy became deeply concerned about the underrepresentation of women in science and technical professions. Research shows that young girls like science and have the same aptitude for it as boys, but in adolescence, girls tend to drift away from science, in part because of subtle gender stereotypes and lack of role models. In 2001, Ride, O'Shaughnessy, and three like-minded friends—Karen Flammer, Terry McEntee, and Alann Lopes—founded Sally Ride Science with the goal of narrowing the gender gap in science.

From 2001 to 2015, O'Shaughnessy served as the company's Chief Creative Officer, overseeing all content—books, websites, and teacher training curricula. She guided the creation of the Cool Careers in STEM and Key Concepts in Science programs, which combine professional development for teachers with student books and teacher guides. O'Shaughnessy also served as chief operating officer of Sally Ride Science from 2009 through 2013, chairman of the board of directors from 2013 to 2015, and chief executive officer from 2014 to 2015.

Sally Ride Science was acquired by the University of California, San Diego, in October 2015. O'Shaughnessy is since executive director of the resulting nonprofit entity, Sally Ride Science at UC San Diego.

== Personal life ==
O'Shaughnessy was the romantic partner of NASA astronaut Sally Ride from 1985 until Ride died in 2012. Their relationship was not revealed until after Ride's death.

== Selected publications ==
- Tam O'Shaughnessy (2015). Sally Ride: A Photobiography of America's Pioneering Woman in Space. Roaring Brook Press, ISBN 9781596439948
- Sally Ride, Tam O'Shaughnessy (2009). Mission: Planet Earth: Our World and Its Climate—And How Humans Are Changing Them. Random House Children's Books, ISBN 1596433108
- Sally Ride, Tam O'Shaughnessy (2009). Mission: Save the Planet: Things YOU Can Do to Help Fight Global Warming! Random House Children's Books, ISBN 1596433795
- Sally Ride, Tam O'Shaughnessy (2003). Exploring Our Solar System. Random House Children's Books, ISBN 0375812040
- Sally Ride, Tam O'Shaughnessy (1999, 2006). The Mystery of Mars. Random House Children's Books, ISBN 0517709716
- Sally Ride, Tam O'Shaughnessy (1994, 2004). The Third Planet: Exploring the Earth from Space. Random House Children's Books, ISBN 0517593610
- Sally Ride, Tam O'Shaughnessy (1992, 2005). Voyager: An Adventure to the Edge of the Solar System. Random House Children's Books, ISBN 0517581574
- Tam O'Shaughnessy (2010). Cool Careers in Engineering. Sally Ride Science. ISBN 978-1933798-32-5
- Tam O'Shaughnessy (2008). Cool Careers in Earth Sciences, Sally Ride Science, ISBN 978-1933798028
- Tam O'Shaughnessy (2008). Ecosystems. Sally Ride Science, ISBN 978-1933798165
- Tam O'Shaughnessy (2006). The Inside Story of Earth. Sally Ride Science, ISBN 978-1933798097
- Tam E. O'Shaughnessy, Kathleen L. Lane, Frank M. Gresham, Margaret E. Beebe-Frankenberger (2003). "Children Placed at Risk for Learning and Behavioral Difficulties". Remedial and Special Education, doi: 10.1177/074193250302400103
- Kathleen L. Lane, Frank M. Gresham, and Tam E. O'Shaughnessy (2002). "The Efficacy of Phonological Awareness Training with First-Grade Students Who Have Behavior Problems and Reading Difficulties". Journal of Emotional and Behavioral Disorders, doi: 10.1177/106342660100900402
- Kathleen L. Lane, Frank M. Gresham, and Tam E. O'Shaughnessy (2002). Interventions for Children With or At-Risk for Emotional and Behavioral Disorders. Pearson, ISBN 9780205321827
- Tam E. O'Shaughnessy (2000). "A Comparison of Two Reading Interventions for Children with Reading Disabilities". Journal of Learning Disabilities, doi: 10.1177/002221940003300304
