= RRS Charles Darwin =

Geophysical survey vessel

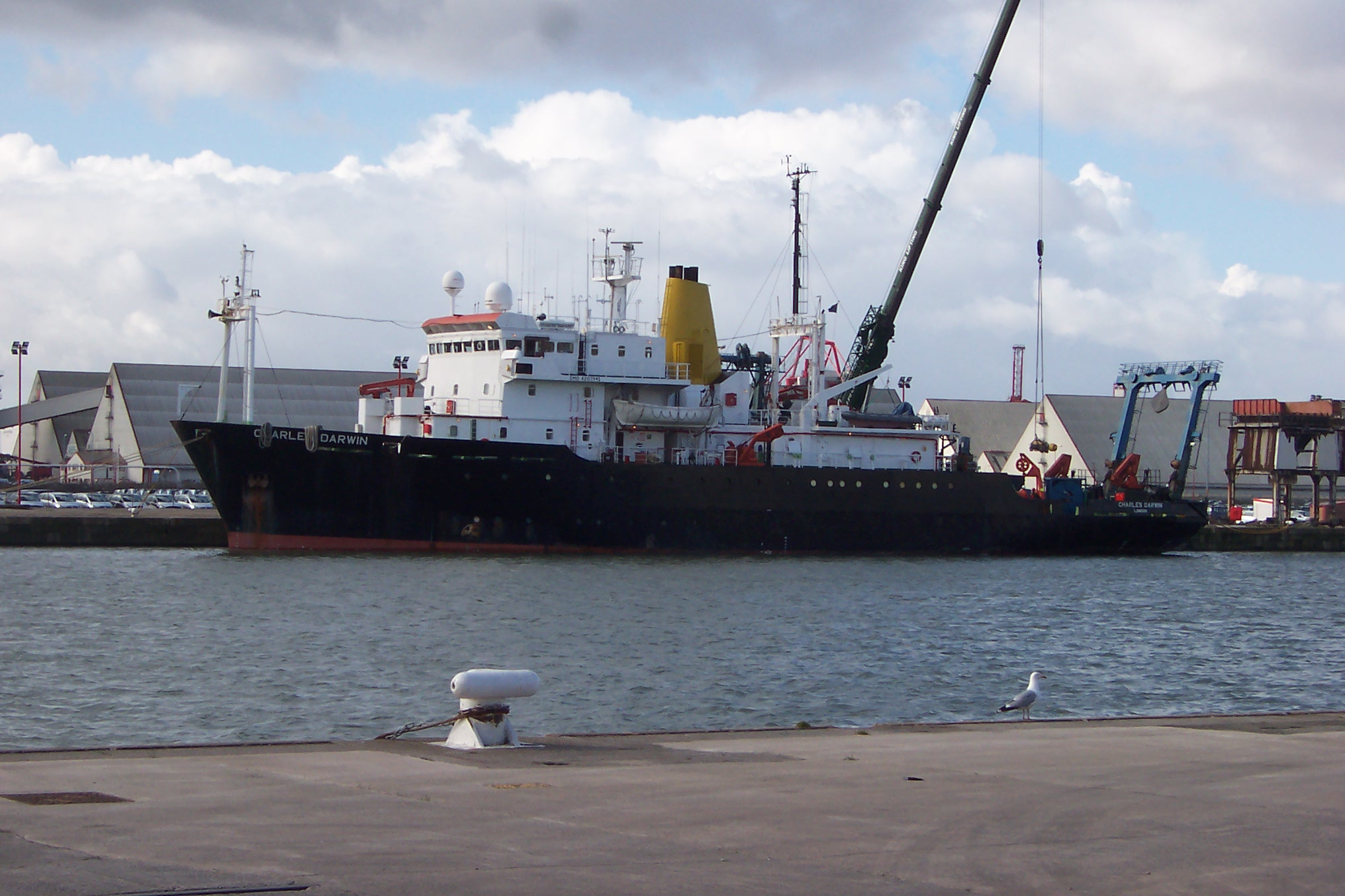
- Charles Darwin in Avonmouth Docks, being readied for a research cruise.

History

United Kingdom
- Name: RRS Charles Darwin
- Namesake: Charles Darwin
- Owner: Natural Environment Research Council
- Operator: NERC - Research Vessel Services
- Builder: Appledore Shipbuilders, North Devon
- Yard number: 138
- Laid down: 1984
- Launched: 22 February 1984 by the Prince of Wales
- Out of service: June 2006
- Home port: London

United Kingdom
- Name: RV Ocean Researcher
- Owner: Gardline Shipping ltd.
- Operator: Gardline Shipping Limited
- Port of registry: Lowestoft
- Acquired: 2006
- Identification: IMO number: 8207941; MMSI Number: 235011460; Callsign: GDLS
- Status: in service

General characteristics
- Type: DTp VII, Lloyds 100A1 oceanography then multi-role survey vessel
- Displacement: 2,556 tonnes, fully loaded.
- Length: 69.4 m (227 ft 8 in)
- Beam: 14.4 m (47 ft 3 in)
- Draught: 4.85 m (15 ft 11 in)
- Installed power: 3 Mirrlees Blackstone MB275 diesels: 7,950 hp (5,928 kW)
- Propulsion: Single controllable pitch 4-bladed StoneVickers propeller; White Gill Azimuthing bow thruster
- Speed: 12.5 knots (23.2 km/h; 14.4 mph)
- Range: 9,240 nmi (17,110 km; 10,630 mi)
- Endurance: 35 days
- Complement: 39 (inc. scientific staff)
- Sensors & processing systems: Simrad EM 12S 120 and EA500 echo/sonar; multiple GPS systems; Bridgemaster ARPA C342/6 and C252/6 radar.

RRS Charles Darwin was a Royal Research Ship belonging to the British Natural Environment Research Council. Since 2006, she has been the geophysical survey vessel, RV Ocean Researcher.

== History ==
RRS Charles Darwin was built in 1985 by Appledore Shipbuilders in Devon. Named after the eminent English naturalist, she was used primarily for research in oceanography, geology, and geophysics. After 21 years of service, Charles Darwin was retired in June 2006, and replaced by the RRS James Cook.

Purchased by Gardline Marine Sciences Limited of Great Yarmouth, she was renamed RV Ocean Researcher, and as of 2012 conducts geophysical surveys.

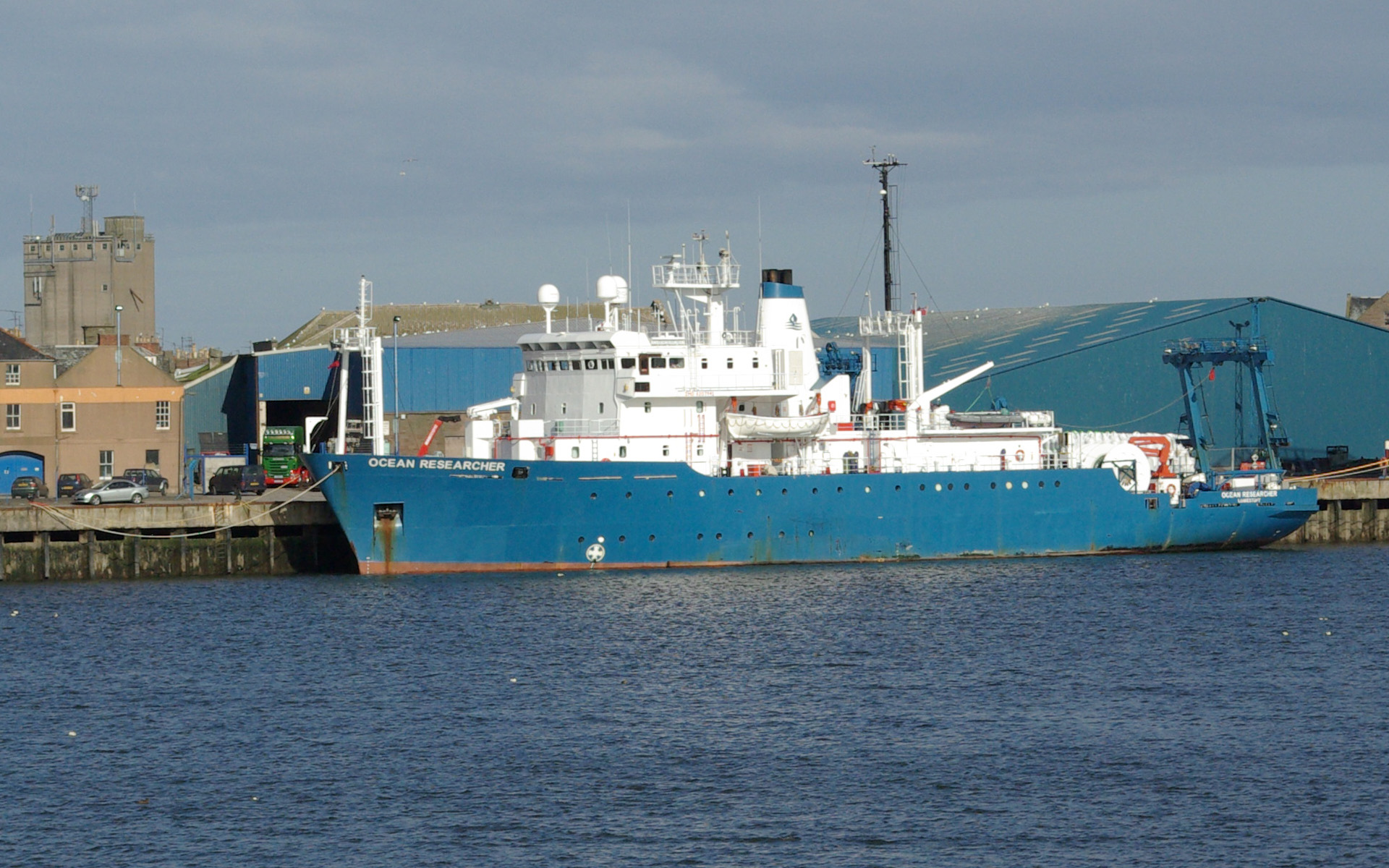
Ocean Researcher

== Science cruises ==
RRS Charles Darwin carried out 180 research cruises, worldwide, in her 21 years as a Natural Environment Research Council ship. The first cruise, in 1985, in the Northeast Atlantic, was led by Professor John Gould. Researchers from the National Oceanography Centre, Southampton, studying climate change, have used RRS Charles Darwin to investigate the slowing of the Gulf Stream. Her final cruise was a geophysical survey for the British Geological Survey.

== Gallery ==
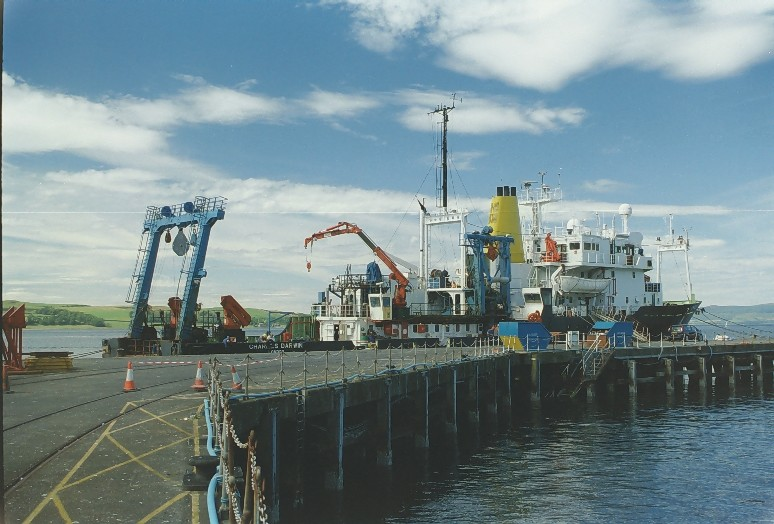
The Charles Darwin in Fairlie, Scotland, at the end of a research cruise in August 2005.

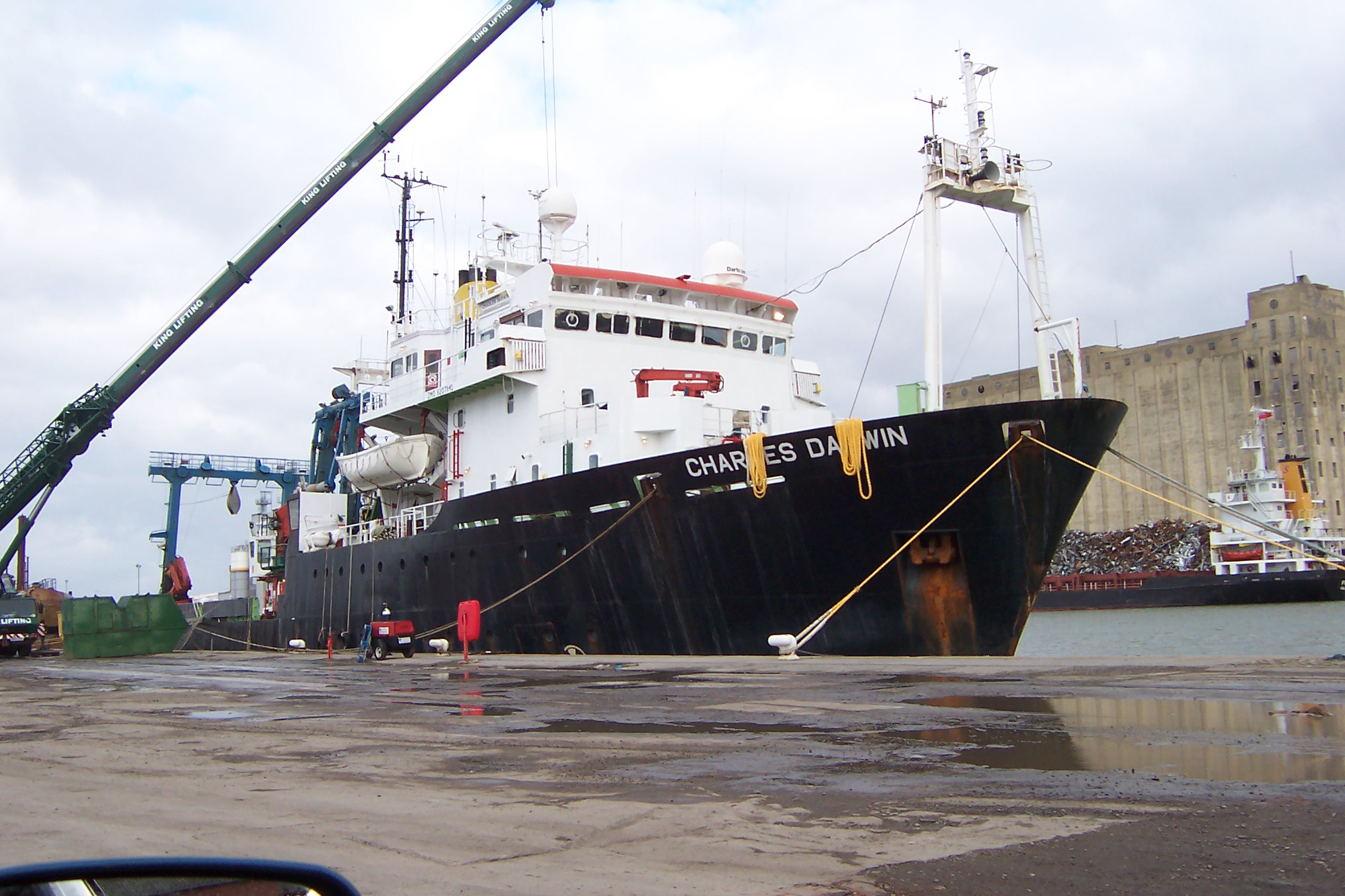
Loading for its last voyage as Charles Darwin, in March, 2006.

== See also ==
- RV Neil Armstrong - United States equivalent
- RV Knorr - Predecessor to the Neil Armstrong
