= RRS James Cook =

Royal Research Ship operated by the Natural Environment Research Council

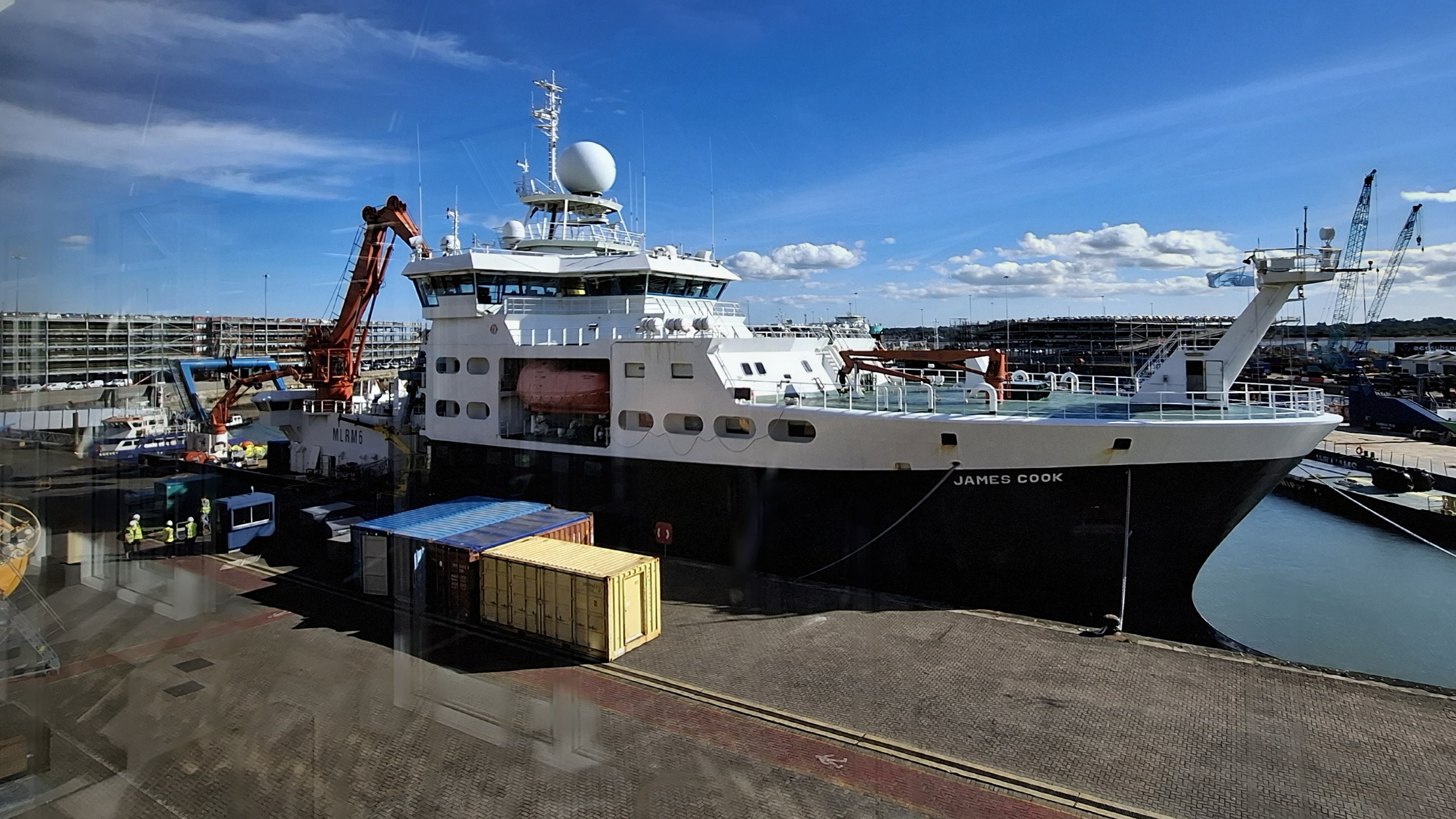
- RRS James Cook at the National Oceanography Centre Southampton in May 2025

History

United Kingdom
- Name: RRS James Cook
- Namesake: James Cook
- Owner: Natural Environment Research Council Research Ship Unit
- Builder: Flekkefjord Slipp & Maskinfabrikk, Norway, Hull built in Gdansk, Poland
- Cost: £36 million
- Laid down: 22 March 2005
- Launched: 4 November 2005
- Christened: February 2007
- Maiden voyage: 5 March 2007
- Identification: IMO number: 9338242; MMSI number: 235010700; Callsign: MLRM6
- Status: in service

General characteristics
- Type: Lloyds +100A1, Ice 1C, FS, +LMC, UMS DP(AM) research vessel
- Tonnage: 5,401 GT
- Length: 89.5 m (293 ft 8 in)
- Beam: 18.6 m (61 ft 0 in)
- Draught: 5.5–5.7 m (18 ft 1 in – 18 ft 8 in)
- Installed power: Wärtsilä 9L20 – 4 × 1,770 kW (2,370 hp); Teco Westinghouse 2 × 2,500 kW (3,400 hp)
- Propulsion: Bow thruster: 1,200 kW (1,600 hp) Super Silent; Azimuth thruster: 1,350 kW (1,810 hp); Stern thruster 1: 600 kW (800 hp) Standard; Stern thruster 2: 800 kW (1,100 hp) Super Silent
- Speed: 16 kn (30 km/h; 18 mph)
- Endurance: 50 days
- Crew: 9 officers; 13 crew; 32 scientists & technicians

RRS James Cook is a British Royal Research Ship operated by the Natural Environment Research Council (NERC). She was built in 2006 to replace the ageing RRS Charles Darwin with funds from Britain's NERC and the Department of Trade & Industry's Large Scientific Facilities Fund. She was named after James Cook at the National Oceanography Centre Southampton by Anne, Princess Royal.

On her maiden scientific voyage, on 5 March 2007, the James Cook set off to study the Fifteen-Twenty fracture zone. James Cook was involved in the discovery of what is believed to be the world's deepest undersea volcanic vents, while in the Caribbean in 2010.

In September 2015, while on a cruise studying the seabed and marine life of the Whittard Canyon on the northern margin of the Bay of Biscay, oceanographers pictured what they believe was the first blue whale in English waters since the mammals were almost hunted to extinction in the north-east Atlantic.

In January 2020 she left Fort Lauderdale to take part in the Go-Ship programme of scientific expeditions, studying the changes in the physical and chemical make-up of the North Atlantic as a result of anthropogenic warming. The voyage ended at Tenerife in early March.

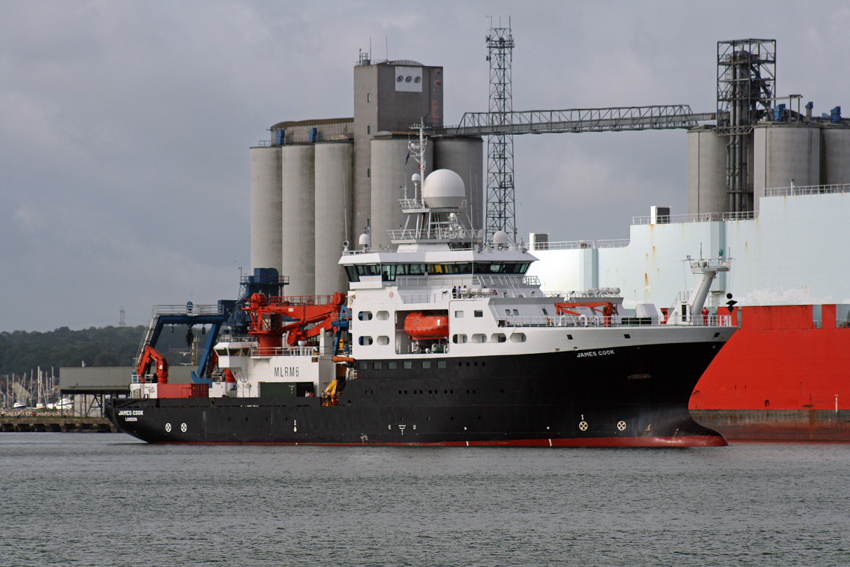
James Cook returns to Southampton following a two-week cruise testing new ROVs

== See also ==
- RV Neil Armstrong – United States equivalent
