= Sally Ride =

American physicist and astronaut (1951–2012)

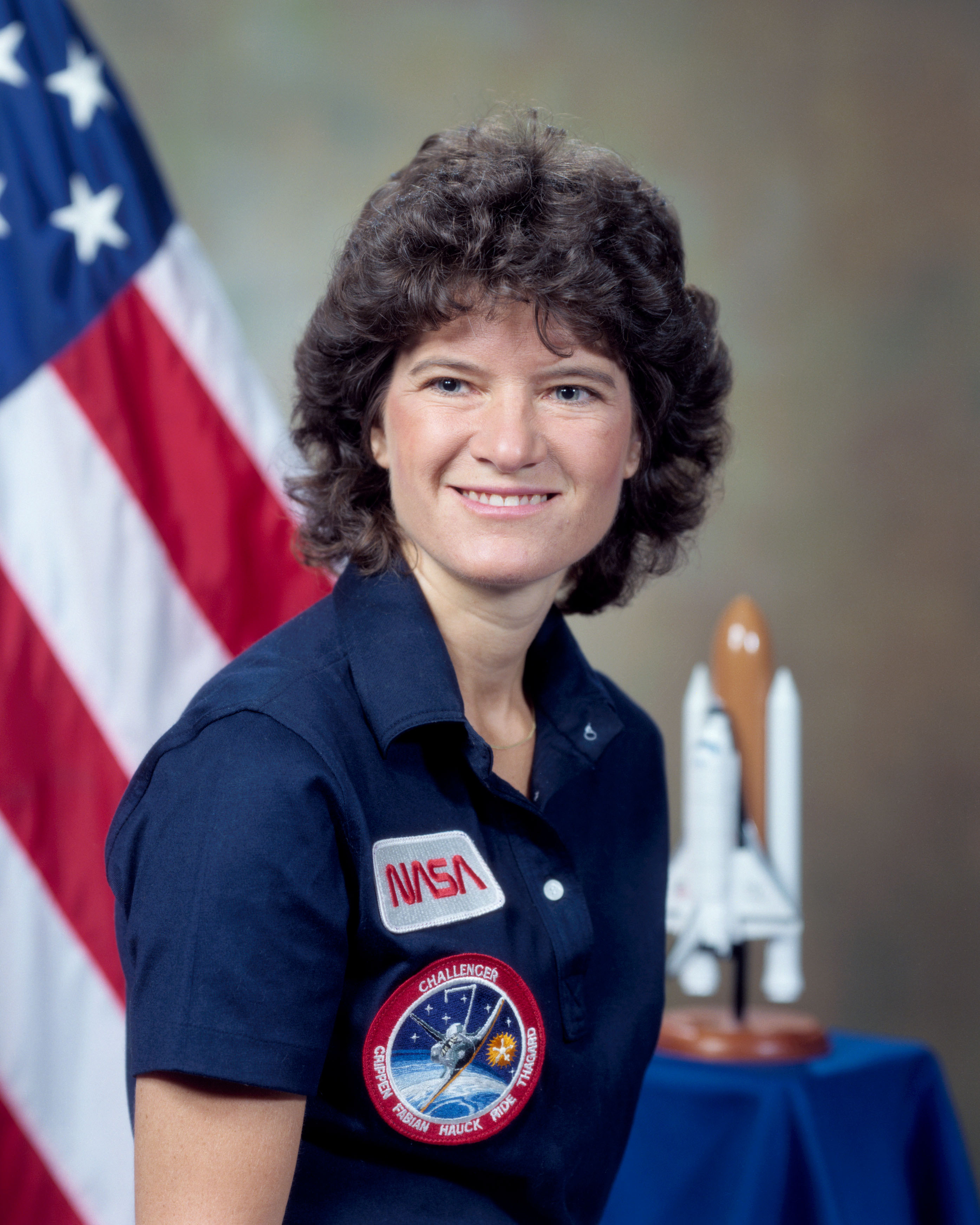
- Ride in 1984
- Born: Sally Kristen Ride; May 26, 1951; Santa Monica, California, U.S.
- Died: July 23, 2012 (aged 61); San Diego, California, U.S.
- Education: Swarthmore College; University of California, Los Angeles; Stanford University (BA, BS, MS, PhD)
- Spouse: Steven Hawley (m. 1982; div. 1987)
- Partner: Tam O'Shaughnessy (1985–2012; Ride's death)
- Awards: Presidential Medal of Freedom (2013, posthumous)
- Space career

NASA astronaut
- Time in space: 14d 7h 46m
- Selection: NASA Group 8 (1978)
- Mission: STS-7; STS-41-G
- Mission insignia: STS-7 mission patch STS-41-G mission patch
- Retired: August 15, 1987

Sally Kristen Ride (May 26, 1951 – July 23, 2012) was an American astronaut and physicist. Born in Southern California, she joined NASA in 1978, and in 1983, became the first American woman and the third woman to fly in space. (Note: After cosmonauts Valentina Tereshkova in 1963 and Svetlana Savitskaya in 1982.) She was the youngest American astronaut to have flown in space, having done so at the age of 32.

Ride was a graduate of Stanford University, where she earned a Bachelor of Science degree in physics and a Bachelor of Arts degree in English literature in 1973, a Master of Science degree in 1975, and a Doctor of Philosophy in 1978 (both in physics) for research on the interaction of X-rays with the interstellar medium. She was selected as a mission specialist astronaut with NASA Astronaut Group 8, the first class of NASA astronauts to include women. After completing her training in 1979, she served as the ground-based capsule communicator (CapCom) for the second and third Space Shuttle flights, and helped develop the Space Shuttle's robotic arm. In June 1983, she flew in space on the Space Shuttle Challenger on the STS-7 mission. The mission deployed two communications satellites and the first Shuttle pallet satellite (SPAS-1). Ride operated the robotic arm to deploy and retrieve SPAS-1. Her second space flight was the STS-41-G mission in 1984, also on board Challenger. She spent a total of more than 343 hours in space. She left NASA in 1987.

Ride worked for two years at Stanford University's Center for International Security and Arms Control, then at the University of California, San Diego, primarily researching nonlinear optics and Thomson scattering. She served on the committees that investigated the loss of Challenger and of Columbia, the only person to participate in both. Having been married to astronaut Steven Hawley during her spaceflight years and in a private, long-term relationship with former Women's Tennis Association player Tam O'Shaughnessy, she is the first astronaut known to have been LGBTQ, a fact that she hid until her death from pancreatic cancer in 2012, when her obituary identified O'Shaughnessy as her partner of 27 years.

== Early life ==
Sally Kristen Ride was born on May 26, 1951, in Santa Monica, California, the elder child of Dale Burdell Ride and Carol Joyce Ride (née Anderson). She had one sibling, Karen, known as "Bear". Both parents were elders in the Presbyterian Church. Her mother, who was of Norwegian descent, had worked as a volunteer counselor at a women's correctional facility. Her father served with the U.S. Army in Europe with the 103rd Infantry Division during World War II. After the war he went to Haverford College on the G.I. Bill, earned a master's degree in education at the University of California, Los Angeles (UCLA), and became a political science professor at Santa Monica College.

Ride grew up in the Van Nuys and Encino neighborhoods of Los Angeles' San Fernando Valley. In 1960, when she was nine years old, the family spent a year traveling in Europe. In Spain, Ride played tennis for the first time. She enjoyed sports, tennis most of all, and at age 10 was coached by Alice Marble, a former world number one player. By 1963 Ride was ranked number 20 in Southern California for girls aged 12 and under. She attended Encino Elementary School, Portola Junior High (now Portola Middle School), Birmingham High School and then, as a sophomore on a tennis scholarship, Westlake School for Girls, an exclusive all-girls private school in Los Angeles. Elizabeth Mommaerts, who taught human physiology, became a mentor. Ride resolved to become an astrophysicist. She graduated in June 1968, and then took a class in advanced math at Santa Monica College during the summer break.

Her friend Sue Okie was interested in going to Swarthmore College in Pennsylvania, so Ride applied too. She was interviewed by Fred Hargadon, the dean of admissions, who was impressed by both her mental and her tennis abilities. She was admitted on a full scholarship. She commenced classes at Swarthmore on September 18, 1968. She played golf, and made Swarthmore's field hockey varsity team. She won all six of her intercollegiate tennis matches, and became the Eastern Intercollegiate Women's Singles champion. She defended her title in May 1969, winning in straight sets. However, Ride was homesick for California and, before Title IX, women's tennis was not well-supported at the college level; Swarthmore had four tennis courts but no indoor courts and she could not practice when it snowed. After three semesters at Swarthmore, she returned to California in January 1970, with the aim of becoming a professional tennis player.

Ride entered UCLA, where she enrolled in courses in Shakespeare and quantum mechanics, earning A's in both subjects. She was the only woman majoring in physics. She was romantically involved with the teaching assistant, John Tompkins, but the relationship ended in September when he went to Moscow to conduct research at the Institute for High Energy Physics. Her foray into professional tennis was unsuccessful; after playing three matches in a single August morning, her whole body ached the following day. She realized that far more effort would be necessary in order to reach the required level of fitness: she needed to practice for eight hours a day. She concluded that she did not have what it took to be a professional tennis player.

Ride applied for a transfer to Stanford University as a junior. The tennis coach was eager to have her on the team, and by coincidence, Fred Hargadon was now the dean of admissions there. He was once again instrumental in approving her admission. She graduated in 1973 with a Bachelor of Science degree in physics and a Bachelor of Arts degree in English literature. She then earned a Master of Science degree in physics in 1975 and a Doctor of Philosophy in 1978. Astrophysics and free-electron lasers were her areas of study. She wrote her doctoral dissertation on "the interaction of X-rays with the interstellar medium", under the supervision of Arthur B. C. Walker Jr.

At Stanford, Ride renewed her acquaintance with Molly Tyson, who was a year younger than her. The two had met on the tennis circuit as junior tennis players. Although Ride was rated number one at Stanford and Tyson was number six, the two played doubles together. Ride later quit the Stanford tennis team in protest against the university's refusal to join the Pac-8 Conference in women's tennis. To earn money, Ride and her then-girlfriend Tyson gave tennis lessons, and in 1971 and 1972 they were counselors at Dennis Van der Meer's TennisAmerica summer camp at Lake Tahoe, Nevada. In August 1972, Ride played in a doubles match with Van der Meer against Billie Jean King, the world number 1 ranked female tennis player, and Dick Peters, the camp director; Martin Luther King III and Dexter King served as ball boys. Billie Jean King became a mentor and a friend. Ride watched her win the Battle of the Sexes match against Bobby Riggs in 1973. Tyson ended their relationship in 1975, and Ride moved in with Bill Colson, a fellow graduate physics student who was recently divorced.

== NASA astronaut ==
=== Selection and training ===
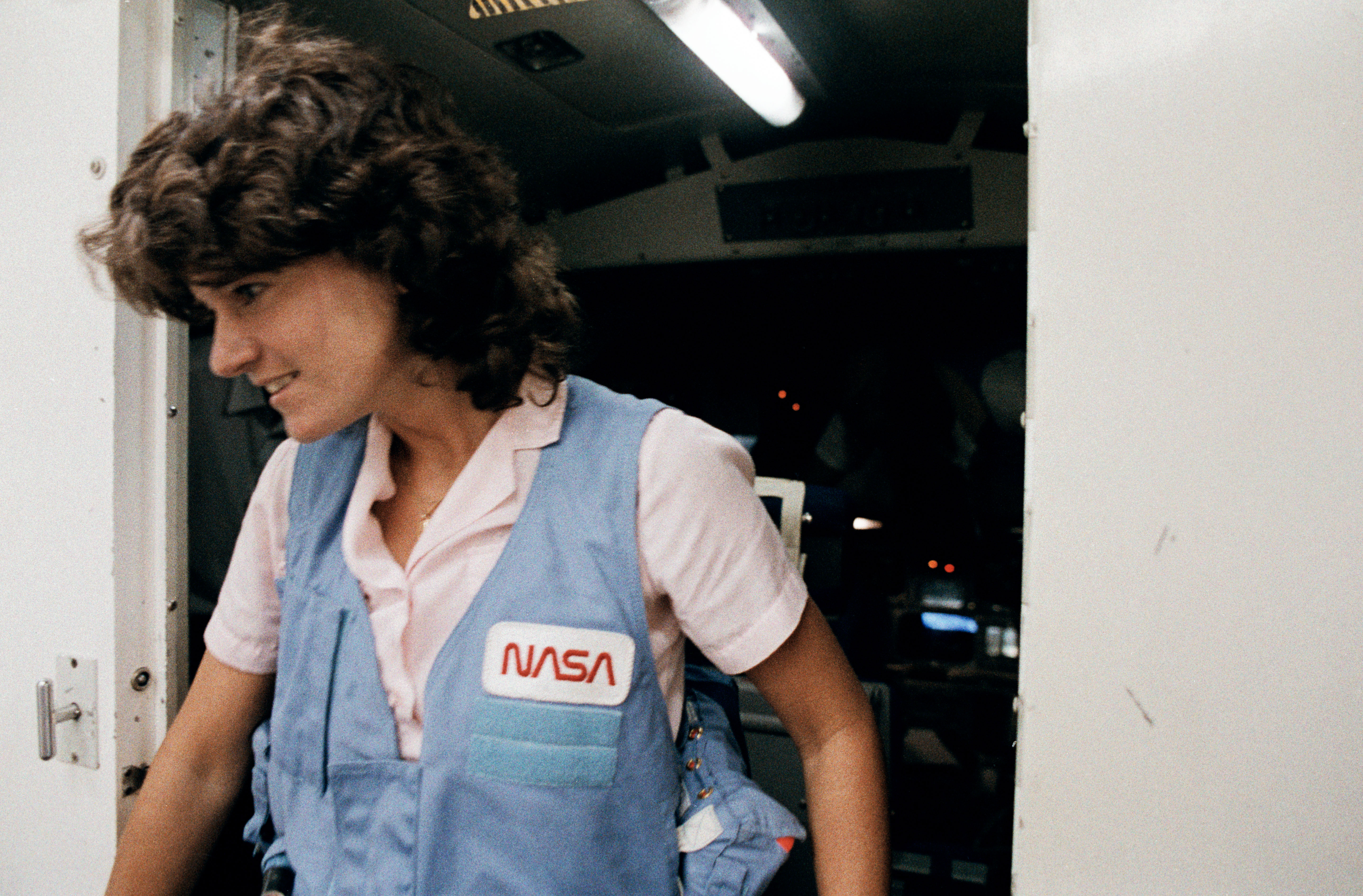
During training in May 1983

In January 1977, Ride spotted an article on the front page of The Stanford Daily that told how the National Aeronautics and Space Administration (NASA) was recruiting a new group of astronauts for the Space Shuttle program and wanted to recruit women. No women had previously been NASA astronauts, although the Soviet Union's cosmonaut Valentina Tereshkova had flown in space in 1963. Ride mailed a request for, and received the application forms. When asked for three persons with knowledge of her qualifications, she gave the names of three of her peers from college with whom she had been in relationships: Colson, Tompkins and Tyson.

Ride's was one of 8,079 applications NASA received by the June 30, 1977, deadline. She then became one of 208 finalists. She was the only woman among the twenty applicants in the sixth group, all applicants for mission specialist positions, who reported to NASA's Johnson Space Center (JSC) in Houston, Texas, on October 3, for a week of interviews and medical examinations. Her physical fitness impressed the doctors. They placed her in a Personal Rescue Enclosure, a ball 36 inches (91 cm) in diameter, to see if she suffered from claustrophobia. She was asked to write a one-page essay on why she wanted to become an astronaut. Finally, she was interviewed by the selection committee. On January 16, 1978, she received a phone call from George Abbey, NASA's director of flight operations, who informed her that she had been selected as part of NASA Astronaut Group 8. She was one of 35 astronaut candidates in the group, of whom six were women.

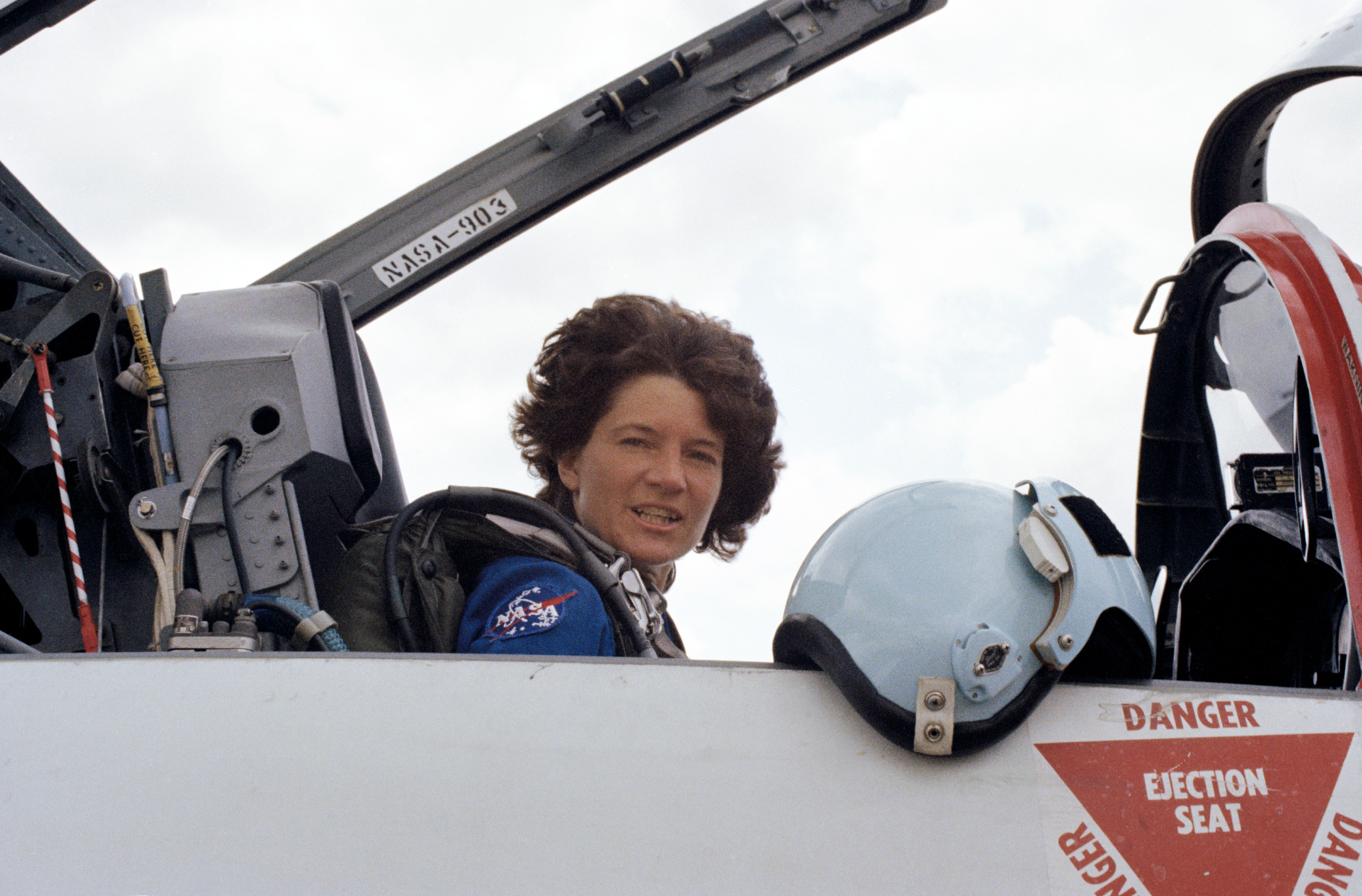
In a NASA T-38 Talon jet

Group 8's name for itself was "TFNG". The abbreviation was deliberately ambiguous; for public purposes, it stood for "Thirty-Five New Guys", but within the group itself, it was known to stand for the military phrase, "the fucking new guy", used to denote newcomers to a military unit. Officially, they were astronaut candidates; they would not become fully-fledged astronauts until they had completed their training. Ride was graded a civil service GS-12, with a salary of US$21,883 (equivalent to $108,019 in 2025). She bought a housing unit in the Nassau Bay, Texas, area, and moved in with Colson, who secured a research grant at Rice University so they could move to Houston together. He became the only unmarried astronaut candidate's partner. Ride and Colson split up in January 1979, and she briefly dated fellow astronaut candidate Robert "Hoot" Gibson.

Astronaut candidate training included learning to fly NASA's T-38 Talon jet aircraft. Officially, mission specialists did not have to qualify as pilots, only ride in the back seat and handle an emergency if the pilot became incapacitated. They were never to control the aircraft below 5,000 feet (1,500 m), but many of the astronaut pilots and pilot candidates, eager to share their love of flying, ignored the rules, and let the more proficient mission specialist candidates fly the jets lower. John Fabian even had her fly "under the hood", with the windows blacked out and using instruments only. Ride enjoyed flying so much she took private flying lessons to earn a private pilot's license. She bought a part interest in a Grumman Tiger aircraft, which she would fly on weekends. On August 31, 1979, NASA announced that the 35 astronaut candidates had completed their training and evaluation, and were now officially astronauts, qualified for selection on space flight crews.

In 1981, Ride began dating Steven Hawley, another one of the TFNGs. They moved in together, and considered themselves engaged. Unlike Colson, he was not aware of her earlier relationship with Tyson. They were married on July 26, 1982, in the backyard of Hawley's parents' house in Salina, Kansas. Ride flew up from Houston for the occasion in her Grumman Tiger, and wore white jeans. The ceremony was jointly conducted by Hawley's father Bernard, the pastor at the local Presbyterian church, and Ride's sister Bear. It was deliberately kept low-key, with only parents and siblings in attendance. They became the third NASA astronaut couple, after Rhea Seddon and Hoot Gibson, who had married a few months before, and Anna Fisher and her husband Bill Fisher, who became an astronaut couple when the latter was selected with NASA Astronaut Group 9 in 1980. Ride did not take her husband's name.

=== STS-7 ===
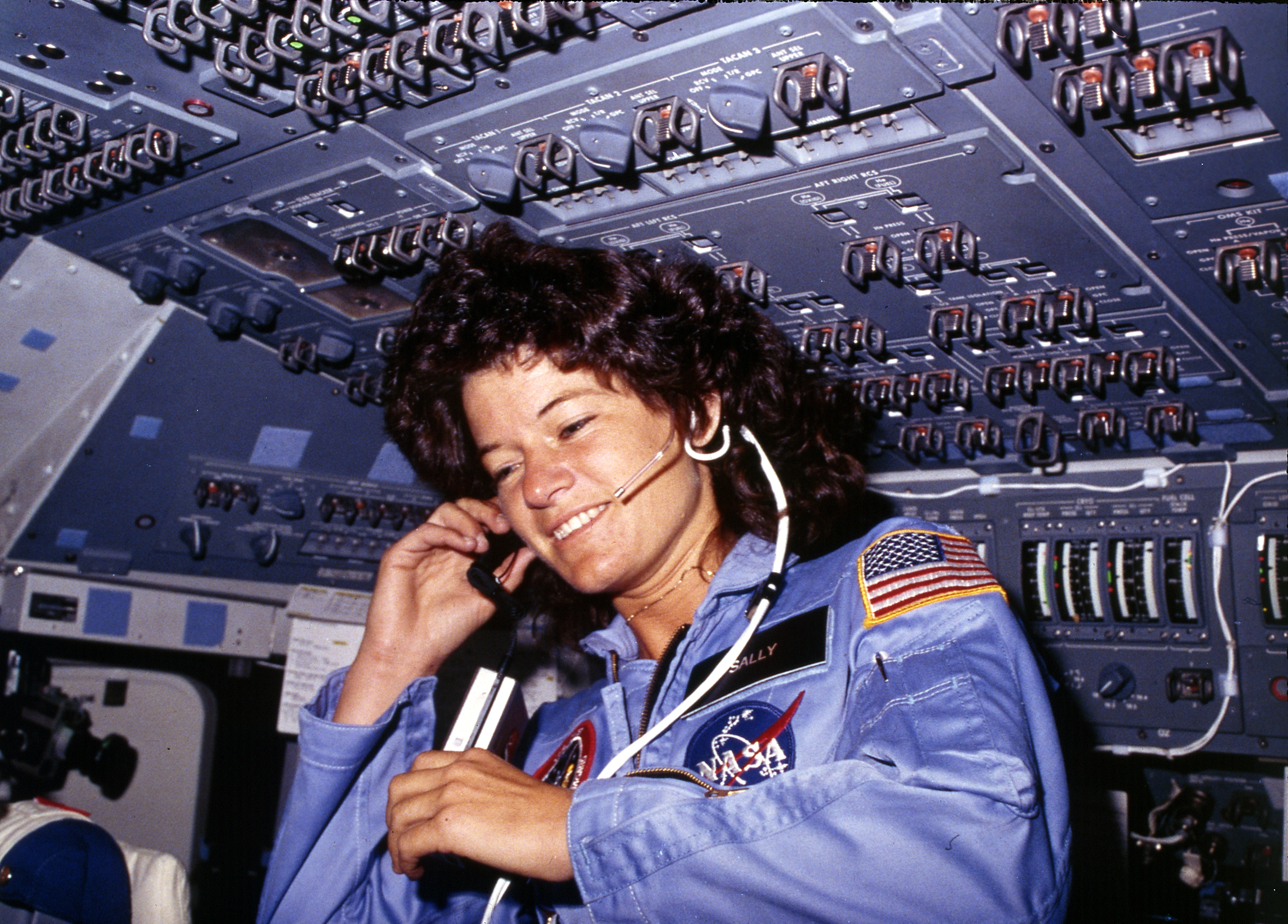
Communicating with ground controllers from the flight deck during the STS-7 mission

Ride served as a ground-based capsule communicator (CapCom) for the second and third Space Shuttle flights, and helped develop the Shuttle Remote Manipulator System (RMS), also known as the "Canadarm" or robot arm. She was the first woman to serve as a CapCom. By early 1982, George Abbey and the Chief of the Astronaut Office, John Young, wanted to begin scheduling missions with the TFNGs, starting with the seventh Space Shuttle mission. To command it, they chose Robert Crippen, who had flown with Young on the first Space Shuttle mission. They wanted a woman to fly on the mission, and since the mission involved the use of the RMS, the choice narrowed to Ride, Judy Resnik and Anna Fisher, who had specialized on it. Factors in Ride's favor included her agreeable personality and ability to work with others, her performance as CapCom, and her skill with the robot arm. However, JSC director Chris Kraft preferred Fisher, and Abbey had to defend their decision. NASA Headquarters ultimately approved Ride's selection, which was officially announced in April 1982.

As the first American woman to fly in space, Ride was subjected to media attention. There were over five hundred requests for private interviews, all of which were declined. Instead, NASA hosted the usual pre-launch press conference on May 24, 1983. Ride was asked questions such as, "Will the flight affect your reproductive organs?" and "Do you weep when things go wrong on the job?" She insisted that she saw herself in only one way—as an astronaut. NASA was still adjusting to female astronauts, and engineers had asked Ride to assist them in developing a "space makeup kit", assuming it would be something a woman would want on board. They also infamously suggested providing Ride with a supply of 100 tampons for the six-day mission.

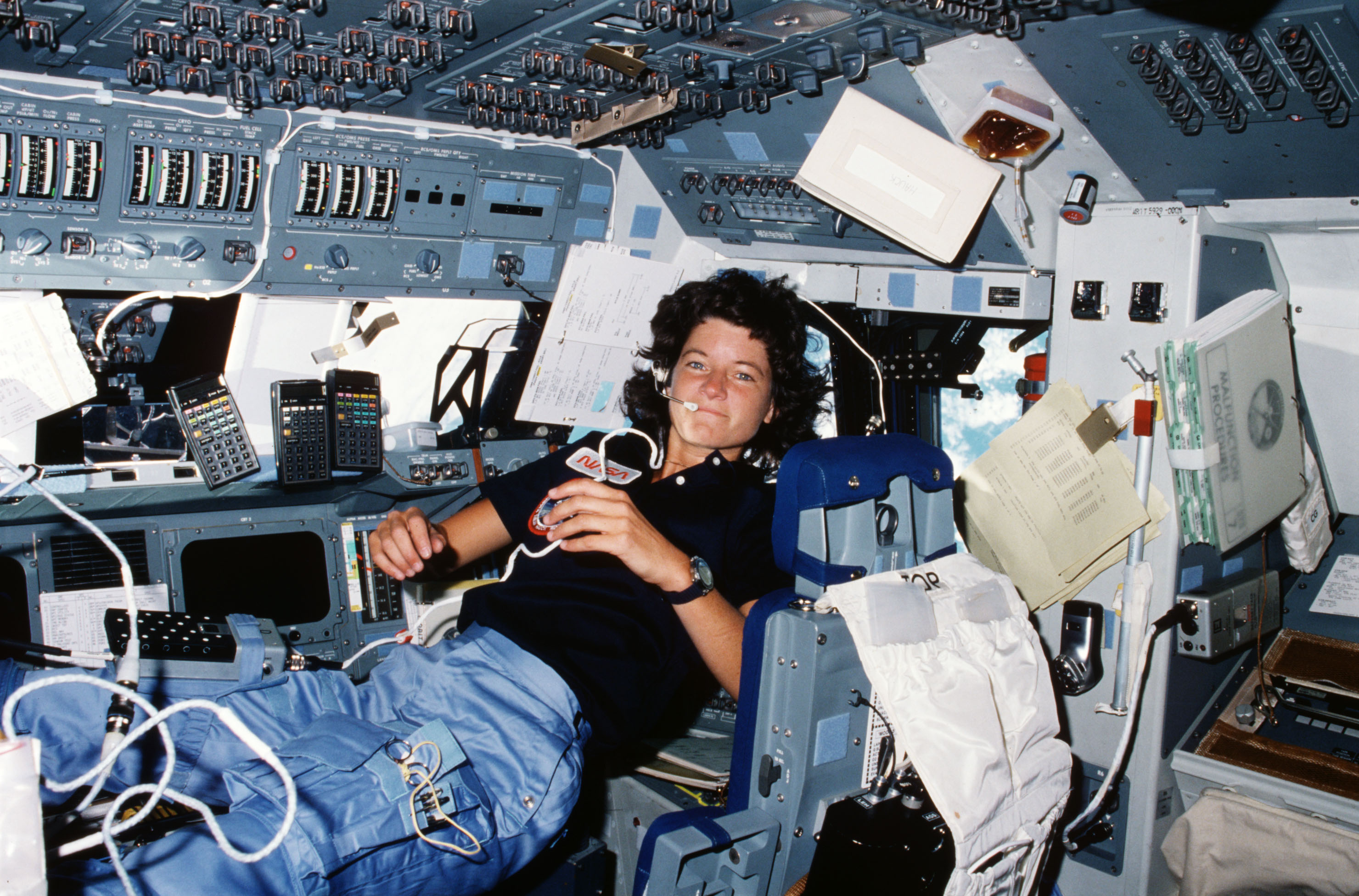
Floating freely on the flight deck of the Space Shuttle Challenger during the STS-7 mission. Left from her head float three Hewlett-Packard HP-41 series pocket calculators customized by NASA, which were used for various tasks on board.

When the Space Shuttle Challenger lifted off from the Kennedy Space Center (KSC) on June 18, 1983, Ride became the first American woman to fly in space, and the third woman overall. She also became the youngest American astronaut in space, although there had been younger Soviet cosmonauts. Many of the people attending the launch wore T-shirts bearing the words "Ride, Sally Ride", lyrics from Wilson Pickett's song "Mustang Sally". The purpose of the mission was to deploy two communications satellites: Anik C2 for Telesat of Canada and Palapa B1 for Indonesia. Both were deployed during the first two days of the mission.

The mission also carried the first shuttle pallet satellite (SPAS-1), which carried ten experiments to study formation of metal alloys in microgravity. Part of Ride's job was to operate the robot arm to deploy and later retrieve SPAS-1, which was brought back to Earth. The orbiter's small reaction control system rockets were fired while SPAS-1 was held by the remote manipulator system to test the movement on an extended arm. STS-7 was also the first occasion on which the Space Shuttle in orbit was photographed, using the camera on SPAS-1. Ride manipulated the robot arm into the shape of a "7", as it appeared on the mission patch. The mission also studied space adaptation syndrome, a bout of nausea frequently experienced by astronauts during the early phase of a space flight. Ride was not affected and did not require medication for the syndrome. Bad weather forced Challenger to land at Edwards Air Force Base in California instead of the Shuttle Landing Facility at the KSC. The mission lasted 6 days, 2 hours, 23 minutes and 59 seconds.

Now a celebrity, Ride, along with her STS-7 crewmates, spent the next few months after her flight on tour. She met with the Governor of California, George Deukmejian, and the Mayor of New York, Ed Koch. She testified before the Congressional Space Caucus on the efficacy of the robot arm, and addressed the National Press Club, but declined to appear with Bob Hope, whom she regarded as sexist. The crew presented President Ronald Reagan with jelly beans that had been flown on the flight. In September 1983, on her own initiative, she met with Svetlana Savitskaya, the second woman to fly in space, in Budapest. The two formed an instant camaraderie, and were able to converse for six hours thanks to Savitskaya's command of English. Savitskaya gave Ride Russian dolls, books and a scarf, and Ride gave Savitskaya an STS-7 charm that had flown on the mission and a TFNG shirt. They signed autographs for each other on Russian first day covers.

=== STS-41-G ===
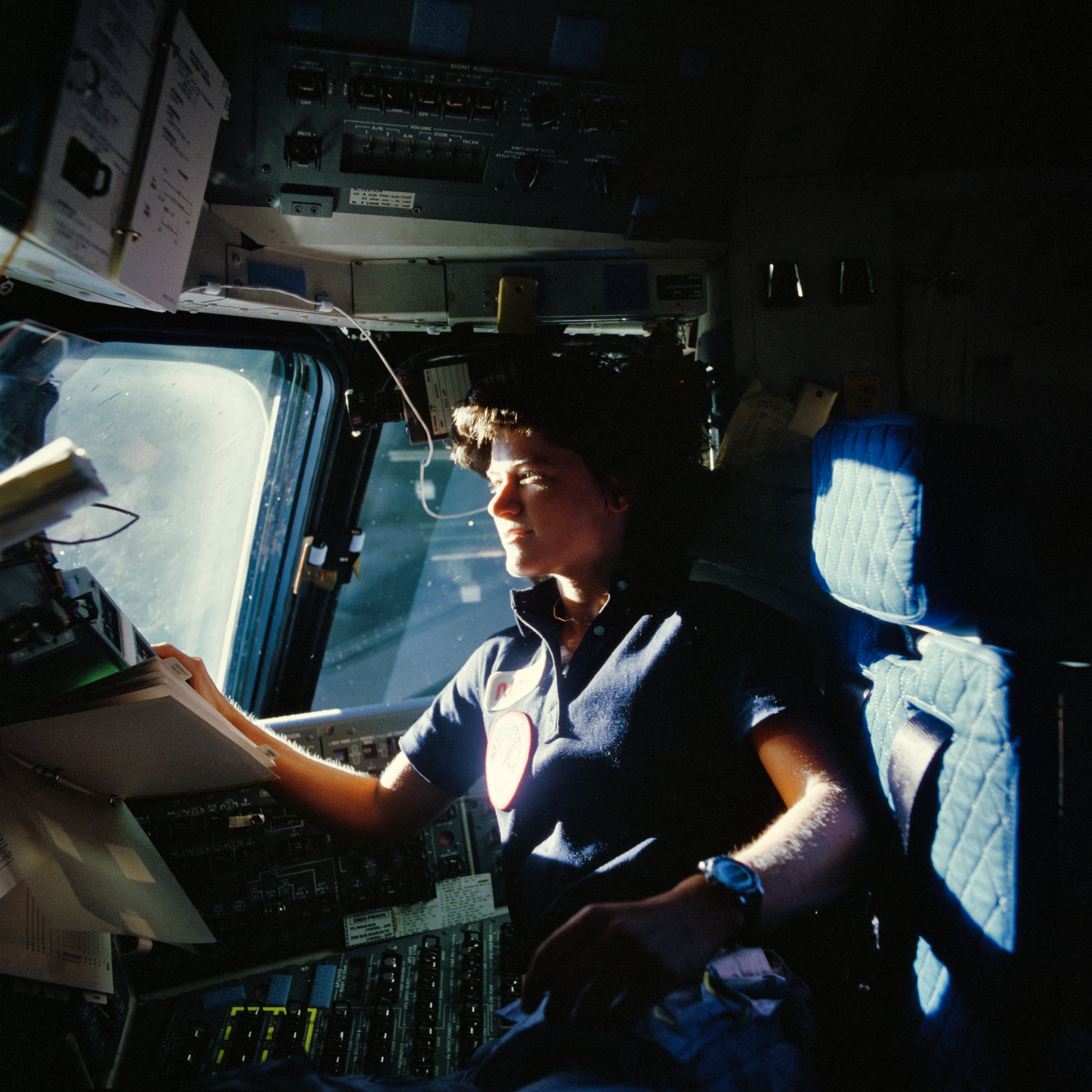
On the flight deck of the Space Shuttle Challenger during the STS-41-G mission

While she was still engaged on the publicity tour, Abbey assigned Ride to the crew of STS-41-G. This was at Crippen's request; he had been assigned to another mission, STS-41-C, that would fly beforehand as part of a test to see how quickly crews could be turned around, and wanted Ride as his flight engineer again so that she could sit in for him during crew training for STS-41-G in the meantime. During mission simulations, she sat in the commander's left hand seat. Ride became the first American woman to fly twice, and her TFNG crewmate Kathryn Sullivan became the first American woman to perform an extravehicular activity (EVA); Savitskaya had been the first woman to do both on Soyuz T-12 in July 1984. It was the first time that two women were in space together.

The mission lifted off from the KSC in Challenger on October 5, 1984. The crew deployed the Earth Radiation Budget Satellite, conducted scientific observations of the Earth with the OSTA-3 pallet (including the SIR-B radar, FILE, and MAPS experiments) and large format camera (LFC), conducted numerous in-cabin experiments, and activated eight Getaway Special canisters containing experiments devised by outside groups.

When the SIR-B antenna failed to unfold correctly, Ride used the robot arm to shake it loose, manipulating the robot arm much faster than she had been trained to. She also repaired a broken antenna on the middeck. During the second day of the mission, the SIR-B antenna had to be stowed so Challenger's orbit could be altered, but its latches failed to clamp and close the antenna, so Ride used the RMS to nudge the antenna panel closed. Sullivan performed an EVA with fellow TFNG mission specialist David Leestma, in which they showed that a satellite could be refueled in orbit. On this mission Challenger completed 132 orbits of the Earth in 197.5 hours, landing back at the KSC on October 13, 1984. During the mission, Ride carried a white silk scarf that had been worn by Amelia Earhart. On her two flights Ride had spent over 343 hours in space.

=== Planned third mission ===
External videos
- Presentation by Sherr on Sally Ride: America's First Woman in Space, June 25, 2014, C-SPAN
- Presentation by Sherr on Sally Ride, August 30, 2014, C-SPAN
- Presentation by Sherr on Sally Ride, February 14, 2015, C-SPAN

Ride was soon back in the rotation, training for her third flight, STS-61-I. This mission was scheduled to be flown no later than July 15, 1986, and was to deploy the Intelsat VI-1 and INSAT 1-C communications satellites and carry the Materials Science Lab-4. The crew was subsequently switched to STS-61-M, a Tracking and Data Relay Satellite System (TDRS) deployment mission scheduled to be flown in July 1986. She also served on two more missions as CapCom. On January 7, 1986, Ride provided a glowing reference for her friend, and eventual biographer, Lynn Sherr for NASA's Journalist in Space Project. Sherr became one of the finalists. During 1985, Ride began an affair with Tam O'Shaughnessy. The two knew each other from the junior tennis circuit, and from when Ride was at Stanford. O'Shaughnessy was now living in Atlanta, and had recently broken up with her female partner. Ride visited when she went to Atlanta on speaking engagements. Hawley was aware that his marriage was in trouble, but not that O'Shaughnessy was more than a friend. Ride still performed her astronaut spouse duties for Hawley when he flew in space for the second time on STS-61-C in January 1986: astronauts and their spouses were quarantined for a few days before launch, and they stayed at the astronaut beach house at the KSC. Spouses were expected to attend events before and after launches, including the post-mission publicity tour. This could be agonizing for a couple whose marriage was breaking up.

=== Rogers Commission ===
STS-61-M was cancelled after the Space Shuttle Challenger disaster later that month. Ride was appointed to the Rogers Commission, the presidential commission investigating the disaster, and headed its subcommittee on operations. She was the only Space Shuttle astronaut and the only current NASA employee on the commission. After her death in 2012, Major General Donald J. Kutyna revealed that she had discreetly provided him with key information that O-rings become stiff at low temperatures; this was eventually identified as the cause of the Challenger explosion. To protect her as source, this information was fed to physicist Richard Feynman, who was credited for discovering and making public the O-ring problem. Ride was very disturbed by revelations of NASA dysfunctional management decision-making and risk-assessment processes such as those which did not detect the O-ring problem. According to Roger Boisjoly, who was one of the engineers who warned of the technical problems that led to the Challenger disaster, leading to the entire workforce of O-ring supplier Morton-Thiokol shunning him, Ride was the only public figure to show support for him when he went public with his pre-disaster warnings. Ride hugged him publicly to show her support for his efforts. The Rogers Commission submitted its report on June 6, 1986.

Following the Challenger investigation, Ride was assigned to NASA headquarters in Washington, D.C., where she led NASA's first strategic planning effort. She authored a report titled "NASA Leadership and America's Future in Space". NASA management was unhappy with its prioritization of Earth exploration over a mission to Mars. She founded NASA's Office of Exploration, which she headed for two months. On weekends she flew to Atlanta to be with O'Shaughnessy. In October 1986, she published a children's book, To Space and Back, which she co-wrote with Sue Okie, her high school and Swarthmore friend.

== After NASA ==
Sally Ride takes questions at the White House Astronomy Night (2009)

In May 1987, Ride announced that she was leaving NASA to take up a two-year fellowship at the Stanford University Center for International Security and Arms Control (CISAC), commencing on August 15, 1987. She divorced Hawley in June. At Stanford, her colleagues included Condoleezza Rice, a specialist on the Soviet Union. Ride researched means by which nuclear warheads could be counted and verified from space, but the impending end of the Cold War made this much less pressing. As the end of her fellowship approached, Ride hoped to secure a permanent position at Stanford. Sidney Drell, who had recruited her, attempted to get a department to appoint her as a professor, but none would. Drell resigned from CISAC in protest.

On July 1, 1989, Ride became a professor of physics at the University of California, San Diego (UCSD), and director of the California Space Institute (Cal Space), part of the university's Scripps Institution of Oceanography. She was paid a professor's salary of $64,000 (equivalent to $166,000 in 2025) plus a $6,000 stipend as director of Cal Space, which employed 28 full- and part-time staff and had a budget of $3.3 million (equivalent to $9 million in 2025). Her research primarily involved the study of nonlinear optics and Thomson scattering. She remained director of Cal Space until 1996. She retired from UCSD in 2007 and became a professor emeritus.

From the mid-1990s until her death, Ride led two public-outreach programs for NASA—the ISS EarthKAM and GRAIL MoonKAM projects, in cooperation with NASA's Jet Propulsion Laboratory and UCSD. The programs allowed middle school students to request images of the Earth and the Moon. Ride bought a house in La Jolla, California, and O'Shaughnessy moved in after taking up a teaching position at San Diego Mesa College. She turned down offers from President Bill Clinton to become NASA Administrator, not wanting to leave California, but agreed to serve on the President's Committee of Advisors on Science and Technology (PCAST). This involved flying to Washington, D.C., every few months for studies and presentations. Due to the experience at CISAC, Clinton appointed her to a PCAST panel chaired by John Holdren to assess the risk of fissile materials being acquired in the former Soviet Union by terrorists in the chaos following its breakup.

Everywhere I go I meet girls and boys who want to be astronauts and explore space, or they love the ocean and want to be oceanographers, or they love animals and want to be zoologists, or they love designing things and want to be engineers. I want to see those same stars in their eyes in 10 years and know they are on their way.

— Sally Ride

From September 1999 to July 2000, Ride was the president of the space news website, Space.com, a company that aggregated news about science and space on its website. She then became the president and CEO of Sally Ride Science, a company she co-founded with O'Shaughnessy, who served as the chief executive officer and chair of the board. Sally Ride Science created entertaining science programs and publications for upper elementary and middle school students, with a particular focus on girls. It moved to the University of California, San Diego, in 2015. Ride and O'Shaughnessy co-wrote six books on space aimed at children, with the goal of encouraging children to study science.

In 2003, Ride served on the Columbia Accident Investigation Board, and was the only person to serve on both the panel that investigated the Challenger disaster and the one that investigated the Columbia disaster. She endorsed Barack Obama for president in 2008, and was contacted by Lori Garver, the head of Barack Obama's transition team for NASA in 2008, but once again made it clear that she was not interested in the post of NASA administrator. She served on the board of the National Math and Science Initiative in 2007 and the Educate to Innovate initiative in 2009, and was a member of the Review of United States Human Space Flight Plans Committee, which conducted an independent review of American space policy requested by the Office of Science and Technology Policy (OSTP) on May 7, 2009.

== Death ==
When Ride delivered a speech at the National Science Teachers Association Conference in San Francisco on March 10, 2011, O'Shaughnessy noted that she looked ill, and had her book a doctor's appointment; a medical ultrasound revealed a tumor the size of a golf ball in her abdomen, which was found to be pancreatic cancer. She underwent chemotherapy and radiation therapy. Ride had ensured that O'Shaughnessy would inherit her estate when she drew up her will in 1992. They registered their domestic partnership on August 15, 2011. On October 27, surgeons removed part of Ride's pancreas, bile duct, stomach and intestine, and her gallbladder. Ride died on July 23, 2012, at the age of 61, at her home in La Jolla.

Following cremation, her ashes were interred next to those of her father at Woodlawn Memorial Cemetery, Santa Monica. Her papers are in the National Air and Space Museum Archives of the Smithsonian Institution. Ride's obituary publicly revealed for the first time that O'Shaughnessy had been her partner for 27 years, making her the first known LGBTQ astronaut. The relationship was confirmed by Ride's sister Bear, who said Ride chose to keep her personal life, including her sickness and treatments, private.

== Awards and honors ==
Ride received numerous awards throughout her lifetime and after. She received the National Space Society's von Braun Award, the Lindbergh Eagle by the Charles A. Lindbergh Fund, and the NCAA's Theodore Roosevelt Award. She was inducted into the National Women's Hall of Fame and the Astronaut Hall of Fame and was awarded the NASA Space Flight Medal twice. Elementary schools in the United States were named after her, including Sally Ride Elementary School in The Woodlands, Texas, and Sally Ride Elementary School in Germantown, Maryland. In 1984, she received the Samuel S. Beard Award for Greatest Public Service by an Individual 35 Years or Under, an award given out annually by Jefferson Awards. California governor Arnold Schwarzenegger and first lady Maria Shriver inducted Ride into the California Hall of Fame at the California Museum for History, Women, and the Arts on December 6, 2006. The following year she was inducted into the National Aviation Hall of Fame in Dayton, Ohio.

O'Shaughnessy accepts a posthumous Presidential Medal of Freedom on Ride's behalf in 2013.

Ride directed public outreach and educational programs for NASA's Gravity Recovery and Interior Laboratory (GRAIL) mission, which sent twin satellites to map the moon's gravity. On December 17, 2012, the two GRAIL probes, Ebb and Flow, were directed to complete their mission by crashing on an unnamed lunar mountain near the crater Goldschmidt. NASA announced that it was naming the landing site in her honor. Also in December 2012, the Space Foundation bestowed upon Ride its highest honor, the General James E. Hill Lifetime Space Achievement Award.

In April 2013, the United States Navy announced that a research ship would be named in honor of Ride. The RV Sally Ride (AGOR-28) was christened by O'Shaughnessy on August 9, 2014, the first vessel in the research fleet to be named after a female scientist, and delivered to Scripps Institution of Oceanography in 2016.

A "National Tribute to Sally Ride" was held at the John F. Kennedy Center for the Performing Arts in Washington, D.C., on May 20, 2013, and President Barack Obama announced that Ride would receive the Presidential Medal of Freedom, the highest civilian award in the United States. The medal was presented to O'Shaughnessy in a ceremony at the White House on November 20, 2013. In July 2013, Flying magazine ranked Ride at number 50 on their list of the "51 Heroes of Aviation". For their first match of March 2019, the women of the United States women's national soccer team wore jerseys with the name of a woman they were honoring on the back; Tierna Davidson chose the name of Sally Ride.

Sally Ride as described by Ellen Stofan
NASA Chief Scientist Ellen Stofan describes the impact of Sally Ride as an astronaut.

Ride was inducted into the Legacy Walk, an outdoor public display in Chicago that celebrates LGBT history and people, in 2014. She was honored with a Google Doodle on what would have been her 64th birthday in 2015. It was reused on International Women's Day in 2017. Stanford University's Serra House, located in Lucie Stern Hall, was renamed the Sally Ride House in 2019. The U.S. Postal Service issued a first-class postage stamp honoring her in 2018, and Ride appeared as one of the first two honorees of the American Women quarters series in March 2022, the first known LGBT person to appear on U.S. currency.

On April 1, 2022, a satellite named after Ride (ÑuSat 27 or "Sally", COSPAR 2022-033R) was launched into space as part of the Satellogic Aleph-1 constellation.

The Cygnus spacecraft used for the NG-18 mission was named the S.S. Sally Ride in her honor. It launched successfully on November 7, 2022.

In 2022, a statue of Ride was unveiled outside the Cradle of Aviation Museum. In 2023, another statue of Ride was unveiled, outside the Ronald Reagan Presidential Library.

== In popular culture ==
- The 1989 Billy Joel song "We Didn't Start the Fire" mentions Ride.
- Ride appeared as herself in the 1999 Touched by an Angel episode "Godspeed".
- Astronauts Chris Hadfield and Catherine Coleman performed a song called "Ride On". The song was later released as part of Hadfield's album Space Sessions: Songs from a Tin Can under the name "Ride That Lightning."
- In the 2013 TV movie The Challenger Disaster she was portrayed by Eve Best.
- A 2017 "Women of NASA" Lego set featured mini-figurines of Ride, Margaret Hamilton, Mae Jemison, and Nancy Roman.
- In 2019, Mattel released a Barbie doll in Ride's likeness as part of their "Inspiring Women" series.
- On October 21, 2019, the play Dr. Ride's American Beach House by playwright Liza Birkenmeier premiered off-Broadway at Ars Nova's Greenwich House Theater in New York City. The play is set the evening before Ride's 1983 space flight, and is about women's desires and American norms of sex and power, lensed with Ride's experience as an astronaut in relation to her sex and identity. The title of the play alludes to NASA's astronaut beach house where astronauts were quarantined before missions.
- In the film Valley Girl (2020), Ride is referred to not only as the first woman astronaut, but also as a valley girl, since she was from Encino.
- In 2021, Ride was featured in the second season of the Apple TV+ streaming series For All Mankind, where she was played by Ellen Wroe. In the show the first American women to fly in space is astronaut Molly Cobb, based on Mercury 13 member Jerrie Cobb, as part of an alternate Apollo 15 mission. Ride serves on the maiden flight of the space shuttle Pathfinder, a nuclear-powered spacecraft capable of reaching lunar orbit.
- On January 28, 2025, National Geographic premiered a documentary called Sally, telling the story of Ride's professional and personal life, primarily through her hidden relationship with Tam O'Shaughnessy. Director Cristina Costantini later said, following president Donald Trump's cancelation of all diversity, equity and inclusion (DEI) programs intended to help overcome prejudice against people who were LGBTQ, female, and also of darker skin color, that "We made this movie not thinking it was particularly controversial; we had no idea it would be this relevant." Costantini also said, referring to Ride's marriage, "People didn't like women in space, and they especially didn't like single women in space".

== Selected works ==
- Ride, Sally; Okie, Susan (1989). To Space and Back. New York: HarperTrophy. ISBN 0-688-09112-1.
- Ride, Sally; O'Shaughnessy, Tam E. (1992). Voyager: An Adventure to the Edge of the Solar System. Sally Ride Science. ISBN 0-517-58157-4.
- Ride, Sally; O'Shaughnessy, Tam E. (1999). The Mystery of Mars. New York: Crown. ISBN 0-517-70971-6.
- Ride, Sally; O'Shaughnessy, Tam E. (2003). Exploring Our Solar System. New York: Crown Publishers. ISBN 0-375-81204-0.
- Ride, Sally; O'Shaughnessy, Tam E. (2004). The Third Planet: Exploring the Earth from Space. Sally Ride Science. ISBN 0-9753920-0-X.
- Sally Ride Science (2004). What Do You Want to Be? Explore Space Sciences. Sally Ride Science. ISBN 0-9753920-1-8.
- Ride, Sally; Goldsmith, Mike (2005). Kingfisher Voyages: Space. London: Kingfisher. ISBN 0-7534-5910-8.
- Ride, Sally; O'Shaughnessy, Tam E. (2009). Mission Planet Earth: Our World and Its Climate—and How Humans Are Changing Them. New York: Flash Point/Roaring Brook Press. p. 80. ISBN 978-1-59643-310-6.
- Ride, Sally; O'Shaughnessy, Tam E. (2009). Mission—Save the Planet: Things You Can Do to Help Fight Global Warming. New York: Roaring Brook Press. ISBN 978-1-59643-379-3.

== See also ==
- List of female explorers and travelers
- Mercury 13
- Sally (2025 film)
- Women in science
- Women in space
  - List of female astronauts
