= Jadson (disambiguation) =

Jadson (or Jádson) is a given name. Notable people with the name include:

- Jádson, full name Jádson Rodrigues da Silva (born 1983), Brazilian footballer
- Jadson André (born 1990), Brazilian surfer
- Jadson (footballer, born August 1991), full name Jadson de Brito Lima, Brazilian footballer
- Jadson (footballer, born November 1991), full name Jadson Cristiano Silva de Morais, Brazilian footballer
- Jadson (footballer, born 1993), full name Jadson Alves dos Santos, Brazilian footballer
- Jadson (footballer, born 2005), full name Jadson Alves de Lima, Brazilian footballer
- Jadson Viera (born 1981), Uruguayan former footballer and current coach

== See also ==
- Jason (disambiguation)
