= Jason (disambiguation) =

Jason is a hero of Greek mythology.

Jason or JASON may also refer to:

== People and fictional characters ==
- Jason (given name), including a list of people and fictional characters
- Jason (surname), a list of people
- Jason (Spanish footballer), Spanish football player David Remeseiro Salgueiro (born 1994)
- Jason (cartoonist), pen name of John Arne Sæterøy (born 1965)

== Arts and entertainment ==
- Jason (opera), a 1696 opera by Pascal Collasse, libretto by Jean-Baptiste Rousseau
- Jason (painting), an 1802 work by J.M.W. Turner
- "Jason" (song), by Terrorvision from Formaldehyde
- Jason (film), an upcoming American slasher

== Places ==
- Jason, North Carolina, United States, an unincorporated community
- Jason Islands, Falkland Islands

== Ships ==
- HMS Jason, various Royal Navy ships
- USS Jason (AC-12), a US Navy collier (1912–1936), sold in 1936 and renamed SS Jason
- USS Jason (AR-8), a US Navy repair ship (1944–1995)
- Jason (1803 ship), a merchant ship purchased by the Royal Navy in 1804 and converted into the sloop HMS Volcano
- Jason (1881 ship), a Norwegian whaling ship

== Science and technology ==
- Jason, a crater on Phoebe, one of Saturn's moons
- Jason, one of two Large low-shear-velocity provinces in the Earth's mantle
- JASON Project, a high school science advocacy program
- JASON reactor, a nuclear reactor in Greenwich, London, England
- Jason (rocket), a sounding rocket launched in 1958
- Jason (ROV), an unmanned submersible robot developed by Robert Ballard
  - Jason Jr., a prototype of the Jason ROV submersible
- Jason satellite series (Joint Altimetry Satellite Oceanography Network), a series of oceanographic radar altimeter satellites
  - Jason-1, a satellite altimeter used to measure the ocean surface topography, deactivated 2013
  - Jason-2, a satellite altimeter, successor to Jason-1
  - Jason-3, a satellite altimeter, successor to Jason-2

== Zoology ==
- Jason, a genus of Facelinid sea slug.

== Other uses ==
- JASON (advisory group), American defense-oriented consulting group

== See also ==
- J Son (disambiguation) including JSON
