= USS Metha Nelson =

A schooner in lumber trade and Hollywood movies

History

United States
- Name: USS Metha Nelson
- Builder: H. D. Bendixsen, Eureka, California
- Completed: 1896
- Acquired: by purchase, 11 June 1942
- Commissioned: 25 September 1943
- Decommissioned: 25 September 1945
- Stricken: 24 October 1945
- Fate: Sold to former owner

General characteristics
- Type: Schooner
- Displacement: 464 long tons (471 t)
- Length: 156 ft (48 m)
- Beam: 36 ft (11 m)
- Draft: 11 ft 9 in (3.58 m)
- Speed: 7.5 knots (13.9 km/h; 8.6 mph)

Metha Nelson (also USS Metha Nelson (IX‑74)) was built as a wooden‑hulled merchant schooner which was later used in historic movies as a full-rigged ship. During World War II, she served the United States Navy.

== Under ship owner Charles Nelson ==
The three-masted top-sail schooner Metha Nelson was completed in 1896 by H. D. Bendixsen of Eureka, California for the ship owner and wood merchant Captain Charles Nelson (1830–1909) who named the vessel after his wife, Metha A. Nelson. The schooner was the 25th sailing ship in his possession, in addition to five steam ships. Her home port was then Eureka. On return from her first voyage to Hawaii in 1897, Metha Nelson hauled sugar to San Francisco.

1899, on a voyage to Tacoma, WA, Metha Nelson was the first ship of Captain Nelson to follow a settlement between unions and a ship owners' association by exclusively hiring union members.

Metha Nelson sailed along the Pacific coast between Seattle and Los Angeles. She also frequently sailed to Hawaii and Latin America (Mexico and Chile). Due to Nelson's connections to the lumber industry of Eureka frequent loads were wood, especially Redwood ties. One freight of 1903 to Topolobampo (Mexico) was rated at about $7,700 (2023: $265,000 ). Metha Nelson sailed to Australia more than once. On a voyage to Siberia she hauled an unusual freight, codfish, to Eureka.

== Alaska Packers‘ Association ==
Following Captain Nelson's death (1909), the Alaska Packers' Association (APA) bought Metha Nelson early 1911. APA was involved in Salmon canneries in Alaska, participating in the Alaska salmon fishery industry. They utilized sailing ships to transport the workers North in the spring and personnel plus produce back South in Autumn. In that context, the San Francisco Call, October 28, 1912, states that Metha Nelson had arrived from Kodiak (Alaska) with a load of Salmon barrels and halibut in tons.

APA also chartered the schooner out, for example for lumber transport from Seattle to Talara Bay (Northern Peru) (1916), and in 1919, she arrived in Seattle with unknown freight from Valparaíso.

Over time, APA relied more and more on steam ships which could carry out two transports to Alaska and back in one season. Consequently, in 1927, when their fleet began their „Hegira“, as the newspaper named it, seven sailing ships were left in the yard, including Metha Nelson. Sales were discussed.

== In the film studios ==
Fox Film Corporation purchased Metha Nelson in June, 1930, as an „old sailship“. and had her remodeled right away: In her first known movie, Seas Beneath (1931), she incorporates the full-rigged sail ship Dolphin. She was soon part of more movie productions, e.g. at The Painted Woman (Fox Film Corporation, 1932) with Spencer Tracy, as William Boyton's ship Southern Cross. Later, she appeared in the movies Treasure Island (1934), Captain Blood (1935), as well as in Rulers of the Sea (1939) and, as the historic ship Tonquin, in This Woman Is Mine (1941).

Sometimes, Metha Nelson is incorrectly mentioned in context of the 1935 movie Mutiny on the Bounty. The two ships in this production were Lily as a replica of HMAV Bounty and Nanuk as HMS Pandora.

In 1938, MGM rented out Metha Nelson to a party including the celebrity lady Dorothy Cadwell Dentice di Frasso and mobster Bugsy Siegel who undertook an unsuccessful treasure hunt on Cocos Island (Costa Rica).

== Service history ==
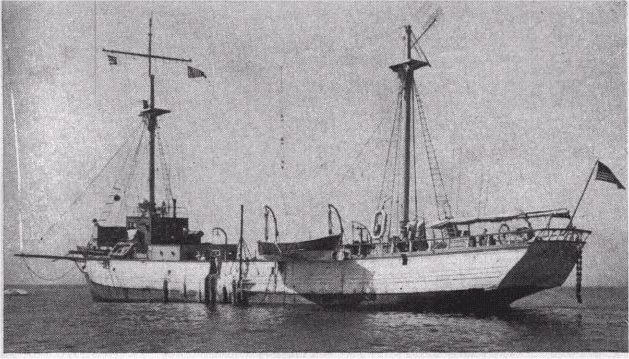
USS Metha Nelson (IX-74)

Metha Nelson was purchased by the US Navy from Metro-Goldwyn-Mayer on June 11, 1942, converted by the Craig Shipyard, Long Beach, California, and placed on service September 25, 1943. Charged with the identification of all ships trafficking in and out of Los Angeles, she lay in coastal waters off the city for the duration of her naval service, also acting as "pilots' boarding house". Placed out of service on September 25, 1945, she was struck from the Naval Vessel Register on October 24, 1945, and turned over to War Shipping Administration a week later.

== After World War II ==
San Pedro News Pilot (Los Angeles) reported in 1947 that the owner, Jack Luden, planned to return Metha Nelson to lumber trade with Mexico. The two remaining masts were to be outfitted with sails, and an 800 HP motor was to be installed. No information on the success of these plannings is available here.

The end of Metha Nelson was announced 1957 when she was stranded on the beach next to National City. According to the picture shown, the rigg hasn't changed from the former USS Metha Nelson (IX-74).
