= HMS Bounty =

18th-century Royal Navy vessel

Coordinates: 25°04′07″S 130°05′43″W

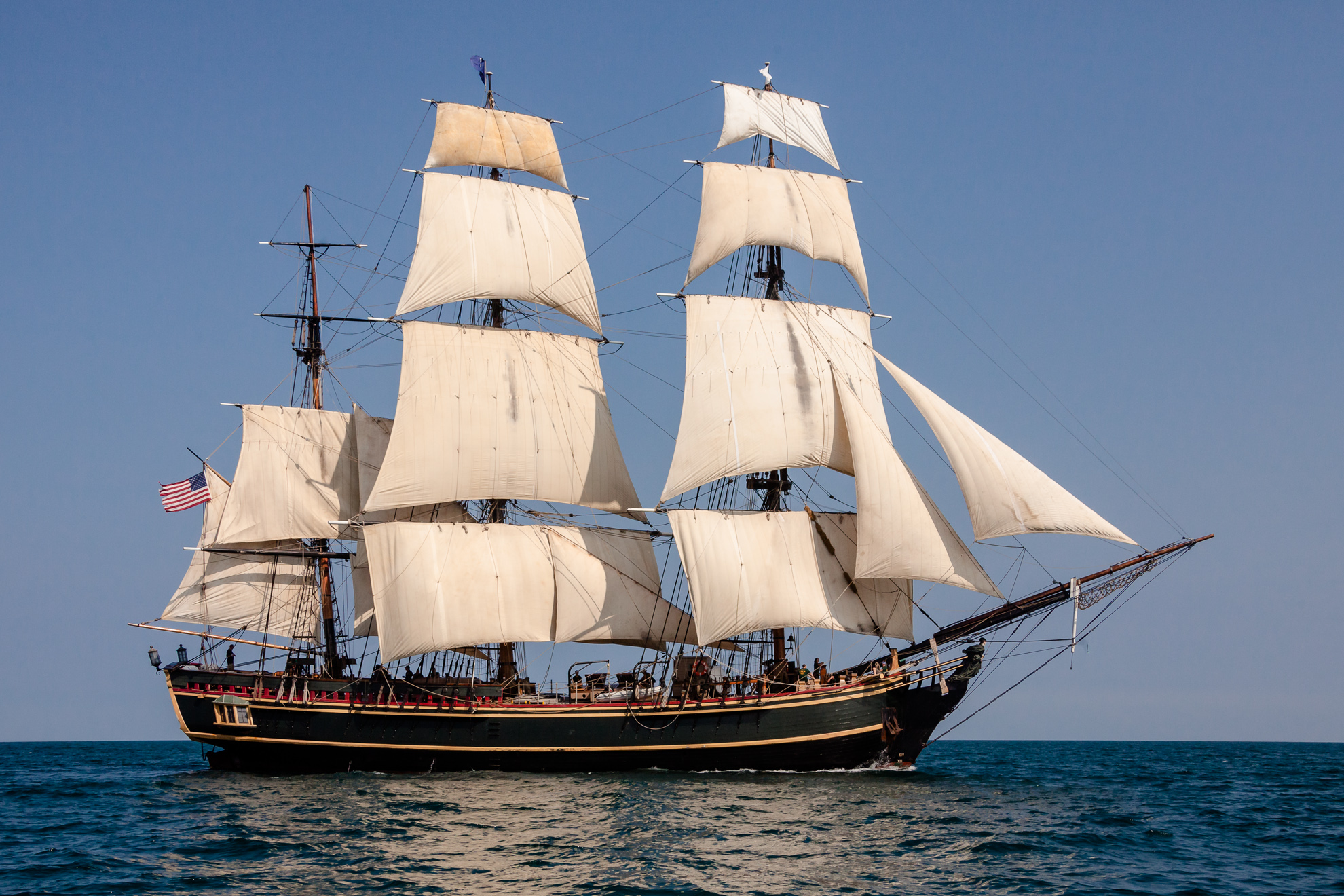
- Replica of Bounty, built in 1960

History

Great Britain
- Name: Bethia
- Owner: Private merchant service
- Builder: Reputedly Blaydes Yard, Kingston-upon-Hull, England
- Launched: 1784
- In service: 1784–1787
- Fate: Sold to the Royal Navy, 23 May 1787

Great Britain
- Name: Bounty
- Cost: purchased for £1,950
- Acquired: 23 May 1787
- Commissioned: 16 August 1787
- In service: 1787–1790
- Fate: Burned by mutineers, 23 January 1790

General characteristics
- Tons burthen: 22026/94 (bm)
- Length: 90 ft 10 in (27.7 m)
- Beam: 24 ft 4 in (7.4 m)
- Depth of hold: 11 ft 4 in (3.5 m)
- Propulsion: Sails
- Sail plan: Full-rigged ship
- Complement: 44 officers and men
- Armament: 4 × 4 pdr (1.8 kg) guns; 10 × swivel guns

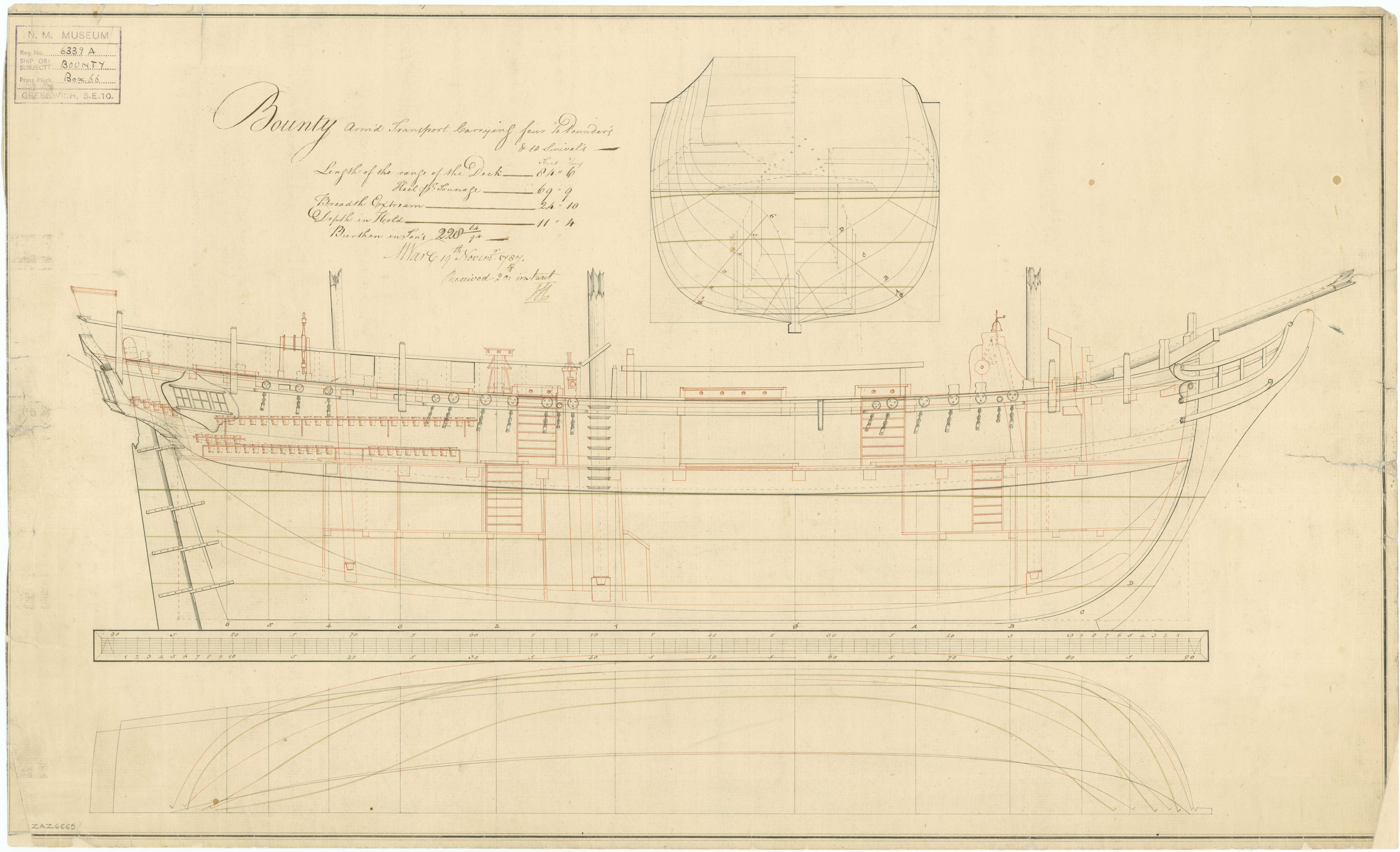
Admiralty Plan of the Bounty

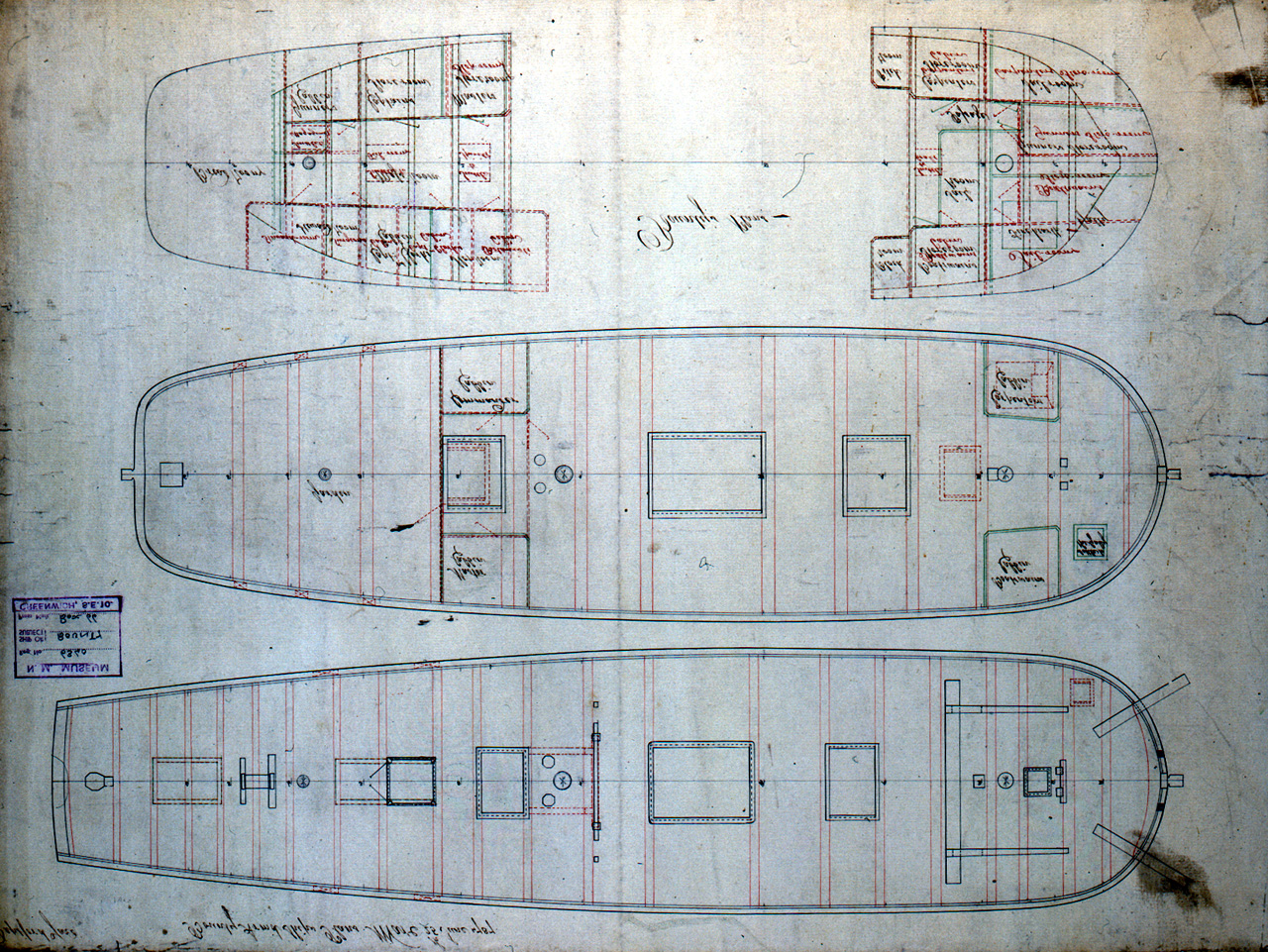
Plan of the lower decks of the Bounty

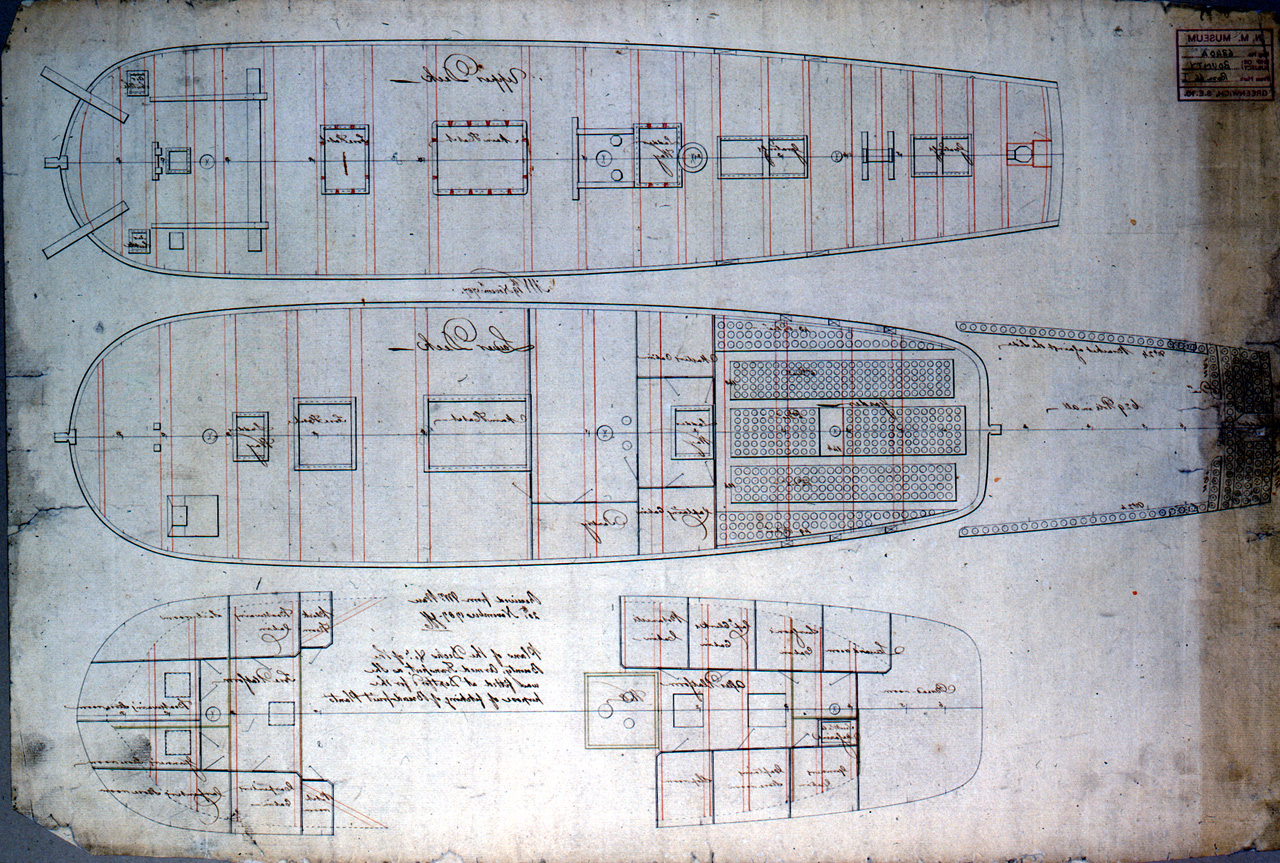
Plan of the lower decks of the Bounty

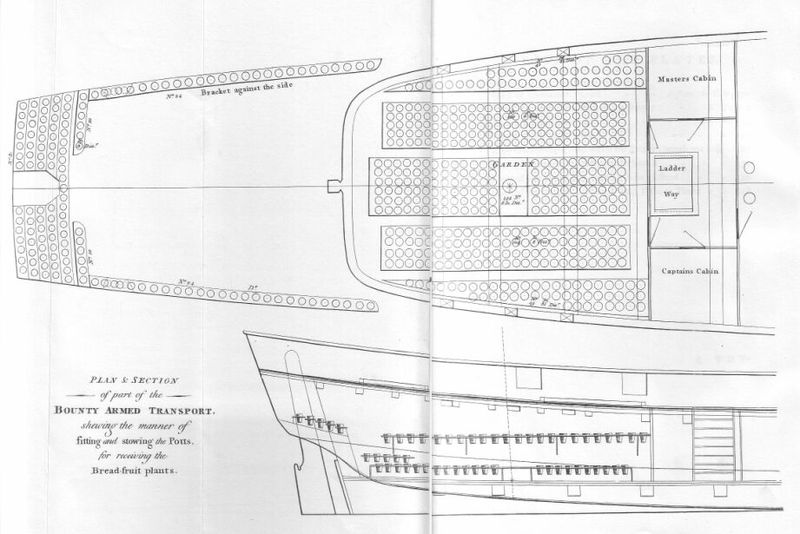
Plan and section of the Bounty Armed Transport showing the manner of fitting and stowing the pots for receiving the bread-fruit plants, from William Bligh's 1792 account of the voyage and mutiny, entitled A Voyage to the South Sea, available from Project Gutenberg.

HMS Bounty, also known as HMAV (His Majesty's Armed Vessel) Bounty, was a British merchant ship that the Royal Navy purchased in 1787 for a botanical mission. The ship was sent to the South Pacific Ocean under the command of William Bligh to acquire breadfruit plants and transport them to the British West Indies. That mission was never completed owing to a 1789 mutiny led by acting lieutenant Fletcher Christian, an incident now popularly known as the Mutiny on the Bounty. The mutineers later burned Bounty while she was moored at Pitcairn Island in the Southern Pacific Ocean in 1790. An American adventurer helped land several remains of Bounty in 1957.

== Origin and description ==
Bounty was originally the collier Bethia, which was reportedly built in 1784 at Blaydes Yard in Hull, Yorkshire. The Royal Navy purchased her for £1,950 on 23 May 1787 (equivalent to £271,000 in 2024), and subsequently refitted the ship and renamed her Bounty. The ship was relatively small at 215 tons, but had three masts and was full-rigged. After conversion for the breadfruit expedition, she was equipped with four 4 pdr (1.8 kg) (Note: See picture of cannon at; for the disposition of the four ship's cannons see.) cannons and ten swivel guns.

== 1787 breadfruit expedition ==
=== Preparations ===
The Royal Navy had purchased Bethia for the sole purpose of carrying out the mission of acquiring breadfruit plants from Tahiti, which would then be transported to the British West Indies as a cheap source of food for the region's slaves. English naturalist Sir Joseph Banks originated the idea and promoted it in Britain, recommending Lieutenant William Bligh to the Admiralty as the mission's commander. Bligh, in turn, was promoted in rank via a prize offered by the Royal Society of Arts.

In June 1787, Bounty was refitted at Deptford. The great cabin was converted to house the potted breadfruit plants, and gratings were fitted to the upper deck. William Bligh was appointed commanding lieutenant of Bounty on 16 August 1787 at the age of 33, after a career that included a tour as sailing master of the sloop Resolution during the third voyage of James Cook, which lasted from 1776 to 1780. The ship's complement consisted of 46 men, with Bligh as the sole commissioned officer, two civilian gardeners to care for the breadfruit plants and the remaining crew consisting of enlisted Royal Navy personnel.

=== Voyage out ===
On 23 December 1787, Bounty sailed from Spithead for Tahiti. For a full month, the crew attempted to take the ship west, around South America's Cape Horn, but adverse weather prevented this. Bligh then proceeded east, rounding the southern tip of Africa (Cape Agulhas) and crossing the width of the Indian Ocean, a route 7,000 miles longer. During the outward voyage, Bligh demoted Sailing Master John Fryer, replacing him with Fletcher Christian. This act seriously damaged the relationship between Bligh and Fryer, and Fryer later claimed that Bligh's act was entirely personal.

Bligh is commonly portrayed as the epitome of abusive sailing captains, but this portrayal has recently come into dispute. Caroline Alexander points out in her 2003 book The Bounty that Bligh was relatively lenient compared with other British naval officers. Bligh enjoyed the patronage of Sir Joseph Banks, a wealthy botanist and influential figure in Britain at the time. That, together with his experience sailing with Cook, familiarity with navigation in the area, and local customs were probably important factors in his appointment.

Bounty reached Tahiti, then called "Otaheite", on 26 October 1788, after ten months at sea. The crew spent five months there collecting and preparing 1,015 breadfruit plants to be transported to the West Indies. Bligh allowed the crew to live ashore and care for the potted breadfruit plants, and they became socialised to the customs and culture of the Tahitians. Many of the seamen and some of the "young gentlemen" had themselves tattooed in native fashion. Master's Mate and Acting Lieutenant Fletcher Christian married Maimiti, a Tahitian woman. Other warrant officers and seamen were also said to have formed "connections" with native women.

=== Mutiny and destruction of the ship ===
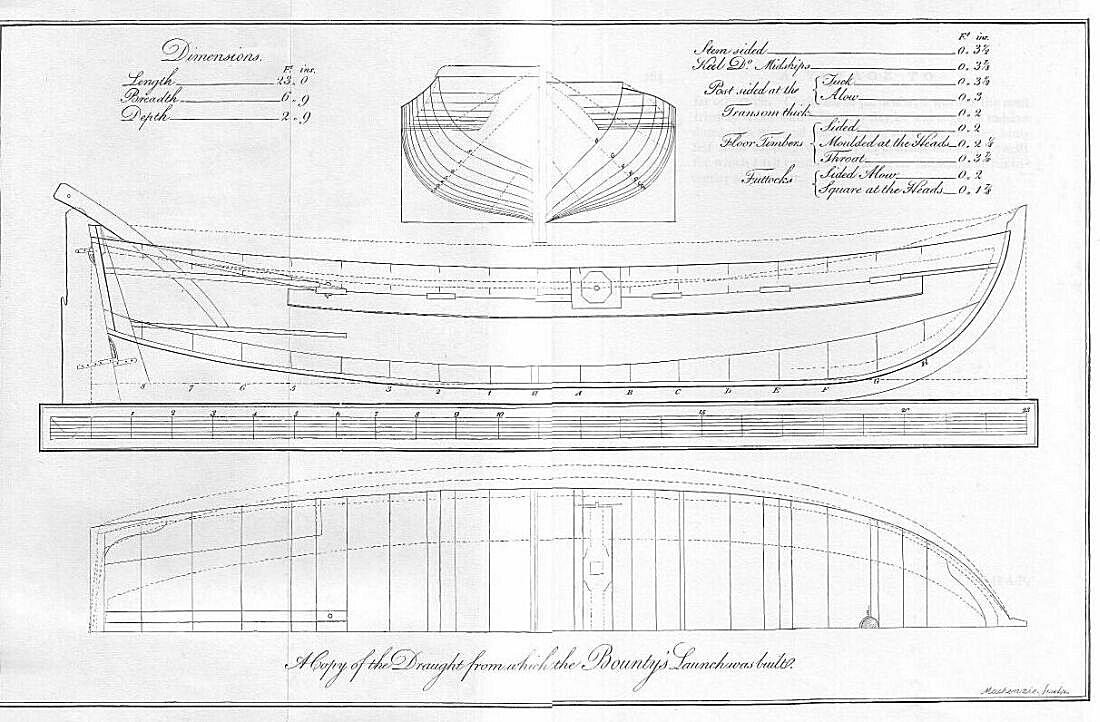
Plan of the Bounty's launch

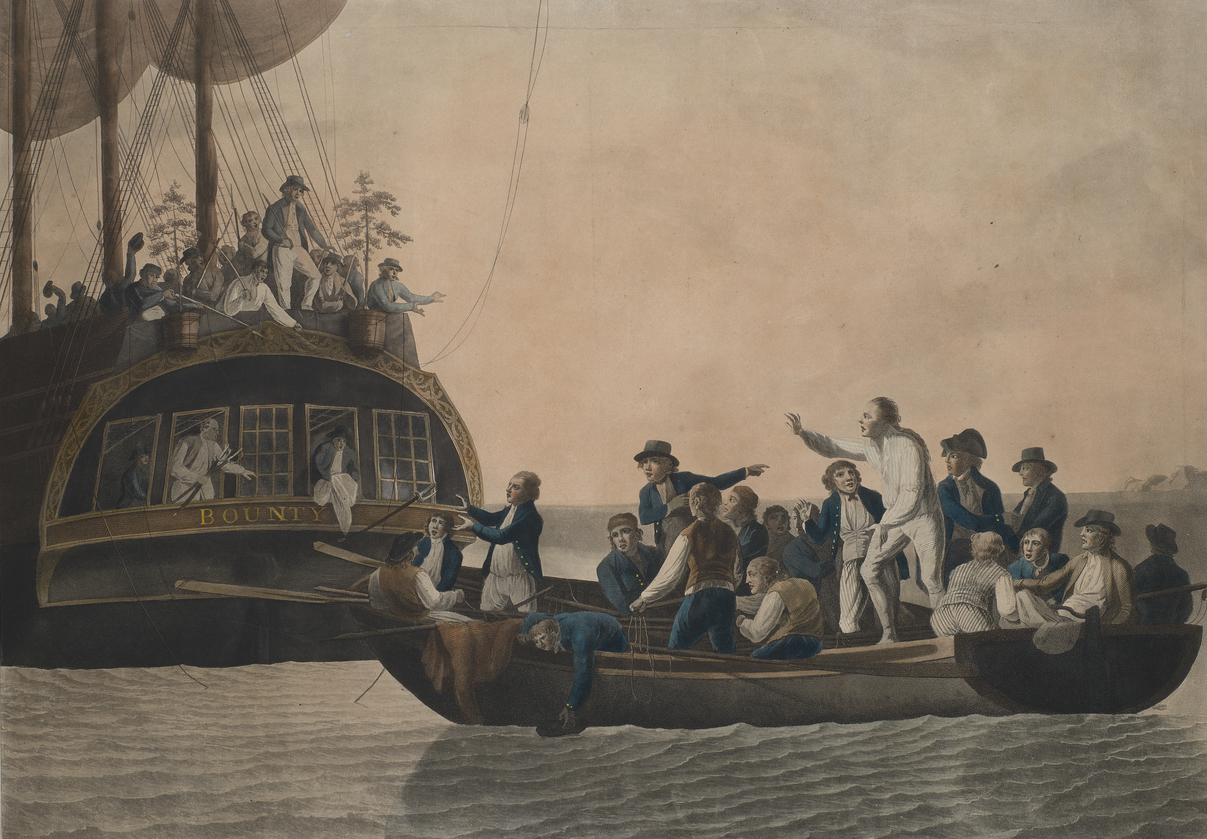
Mutineers turning Bligh and crew adrift, by Robert Dodd, 1790

After five months in Tahiti, Bounty set sail with her breadfruit cargo on 4 April 1789. Some 1,300 mi (2,100 km) west of Tahiti, near Tonga, mutiny broke out on 28 April 1789. Despite strong words and threats heard on both sides, the ship was taken bloodlessly and apparently without struggle by any of the loyalists except Bligh himself. Of the 42 men on board aside from Bligh and Christian, 22 joined Christian in mutiny, two were passive, and 18 remained loyal to Bligh.

The mutineers ordered Bligh, two midshipmen, the surgeon's mate (Ledward), and the ship's clerk into the ship's boat. Several more men voluntarily joined Bligh rather than remain aboard. Bligh and his men sailed the open boat 30 nmi (56 km) to Tofua in search of supplies, but were forced to flee after attacks by hostile natives resulted in the death of one of the men.

Bligh then undertook an arduous journey to the Dutch settlement of Coupang, located over 3,500 nmi (6,500 km) from Tofua. He safely landed there 47 days later, having lost no men during the voyage except the one killed on Tofua.

The mutineers sailed for the island of Tubuai, where they tried to settle. After three months of bloody conflict with the natives, however, they returned to Tahiti. Sixteen of the mutineers – including the four loyalists who had been unable to accompany Bligh – remained there, taking their chances that the Royal Navy would not find them and bring them to justice.

HMS Pandora was sent out by the Admiralty in November 1790 in pursuit of Bounty, to capture the mutineers and bring them back to Britain to face a court martial. She arrived in March 1791 and captured fourteen men within two weeks; they were locked away in a makeshift wooden prison on Pandora's quarterdeck. The men called their cell "Pandora's box". They remained in their prison until 29 August 1791 when Pandora was wrecked on the Great Barrier Reef with the loss of 35 lives, including one loyalist and three mutineers (Stewart, Sumner, Skinner, and Hildebrand).

Immediately after setting the sixteen men ashore in Tahiti in September 1789, Fletcher Christian, eight other crewmen, six Tahitian men, and 11 women, one with a baby, set sail in Bounty hoping to elude the Royal Navy. According to a journal kept by one of Christian's followers, the Tahitians were actually kidnapped when Christian set sail without warning them, the purpose of this being to acquire the women. The mutineers passed through the Fiji and Cook Islands, but feared that they would be found there.

Continuing their quest for a safe haven, on 15 January 1790 they rediscovered Pitcairn Island, which had been misplaced on the Royal Navy's charts. After the decision was made to settle on Pitcairn, livestock and other provisions were removed from Bounty. To prevent the ship's detection, and anyone's possible escape, the ship was burned on 23 January 1790 in what is now called Bounty Bay.

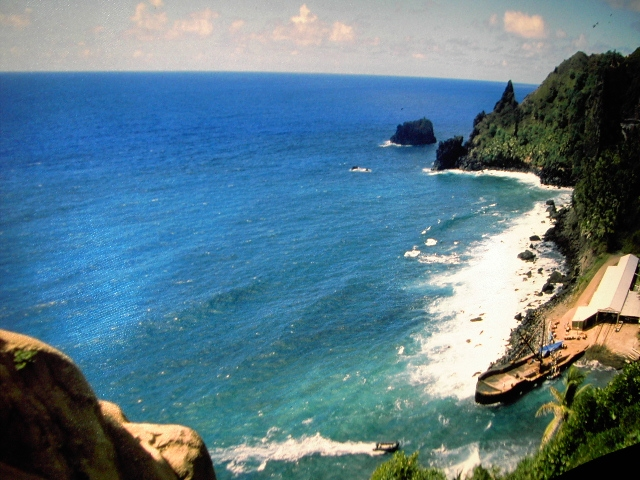
Bounty Bay, where Bounty was grounded and set alight

The mutineers remained undetected on Pitcairn until February 1808, when sole remaining mutineer John Adams and the surviving Tahitian women and their children were discovered by the Boston sealer Topaz, commanded by Captain Mayhew Folger of Nantucket, Massachusetts. Adams gave to Folger the Bounty's azimuth compass and marine chronometer.

Seventeen years later, in 1825, HMS Blossom, on a voyage of exploration under Captain Frederick William Beechey, arrived on Christmas Day off Pitcairn and spent 19 days there. Beechey later recorded this in his 1831 published account of the voyage, as did one of his crew, John Bechervaise, in his 1839 Thirty-Six Years of a Seafaring Life by an Old Quarter Master. Beechey wrote a detailed account of the mutiny as recounted to him by the last survivor, Adams. Bechervaise, who described the life of the islanders, says he found the remains of Bounty and took some pieces of wood from it which were turned into souvenirs such as snuff boxes.

== Mission details ==
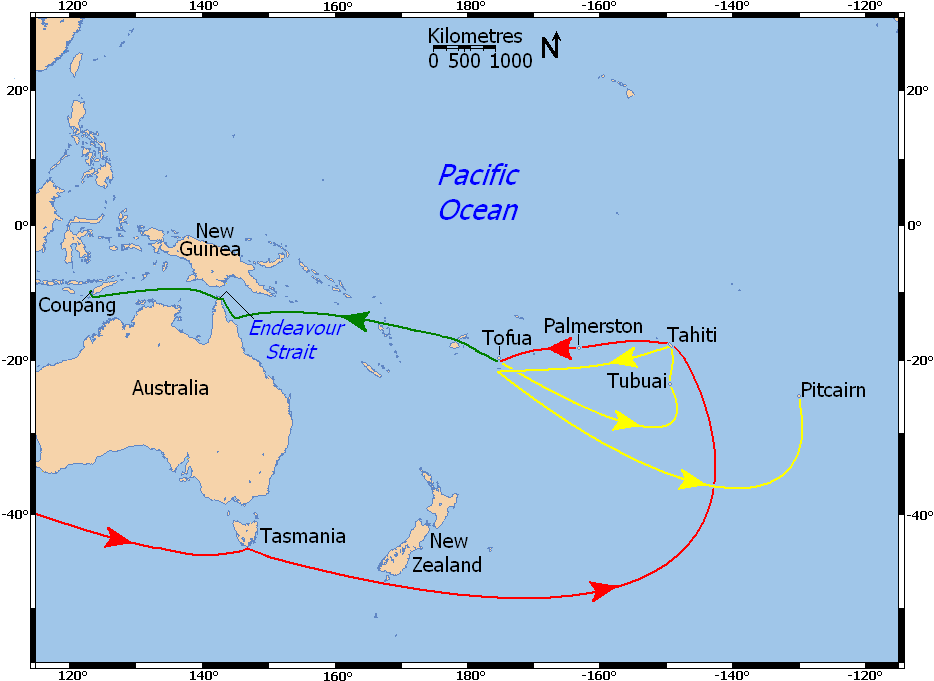
Bounty's movements in the Pacific Ocean Voyage to Tahiti and mutiny location of 28 April 1789 After the mutiny, under Christian's command Bligh's open-boat journey to Coupang

The details of the voyage of Bounty are very well documented, largely due to the effort of Bligh to maintain an accurate log before, during, and after the actual mutiny. Bounty's crew list is also well chronicled.

Bligh's original log remained intact throughout his ordeal and was used as a major piece of evidence in his own trial for the loss of Bounty, as well as the subsequent trial of captured mutineers. The original log is currently maintained at the State Library of New South Wales, with available transcripts in both print and electronic format.

=== Mission log ===
1787
16 August: William Bligh is ordered to command a breadfruit gathering expedition to Tahiti
3 September: Bounty launched from the drydock at Deptford
4–9 October: Bounty navigated with a partial crew to an ammunition loading station, south of Deptford
10–12 October: Onload of arms and weapons at Long Reach
15 October – 4 November: Navigated to Spithead for final crew and stores onload
29 November: Made anchor at St Helens, Isle of Wight
23 December: Departed English waters for Tahiti
1788
5–10 January: Anchored off Tenerife, Canary Islands
5 February: Crossed equator at 21.50 degrees West
26 February: Marked at 100 leagues from the eastern coast of Brazil
23 March: Arrived Tierra del Fuego
9 April: Entered the Strait of Magellan
25 April: Abandoned attempt to round Cape Horn and turned east
22 May: Within sight of the Cape of Good Hope
24 May – 29 June: Anchored at Simon's Bay
28 July: Within sight of Saint Paul's Island, west of Van Diemen's Land
20 August – 2 September: Anchored Van Diemen's Land
19 September: Past the southern tip of New Zealand
26 October: Arrived Tahiti
25 December: Shifted mooring to "Toahroah" harbour, Pare "Oparre", Tahiti. Bounty ran aground.
1789
4 April: Weighed anchor from the harbour at Pare, Tahiti
23–25 April: Anchored for provisions off Annamooka (Tonga)
26 April: Departed Annamooka for the West Indies
28 April: Mutiny – Captain Bligh and loyal crew members set adrift in Bounty's launch
From this point, Bligh's mission log reflects the voyage of the Bounty launch towards the Dutch East Indies
29 April: Bounty launch arrives at Tofua
2 May: Bounty launch castaways flee Tofua after being attacked by natives
28 May: Landfall on a small island north of New Hebrides. Named "Restoration Island" by Captain Bligh
30–31 May: Bounty launch transits to a second nearby island, named "Sunday Island"
1–2 June: Bounty launch transits 42 miles to a third island, named "Turtle Island"
3 June: Bounty launch sails into the open ocean towards Australia
13 June: Bounty launch lands at Timor
14 June: Launch castaways circle Timor and land at Coupang. Mutiny is reported to Dutch authorities
Bligh's mission log from this point reflects his return to England onboard various merchant vessels and sailing ships
20 August – 10 September: Sailed via schooner to Pasuruan, Java
11–12 September: In transit to Surabaya
15–17 September: In transit to the town of Gresik, Madura Strait
18–22 September: In transit to Semarang
26 September – 1 October: In transit to Batavia (Jakarta)
16 October: Sailed for Europe on board the Dutch packet SS Vlydte
16 December: Arrived Cape of Good Hope
1790
13 January: Sailed from Cape of Good Hope for England
13 March: Arrived Portsmouth Harbour

=== Crew list ===
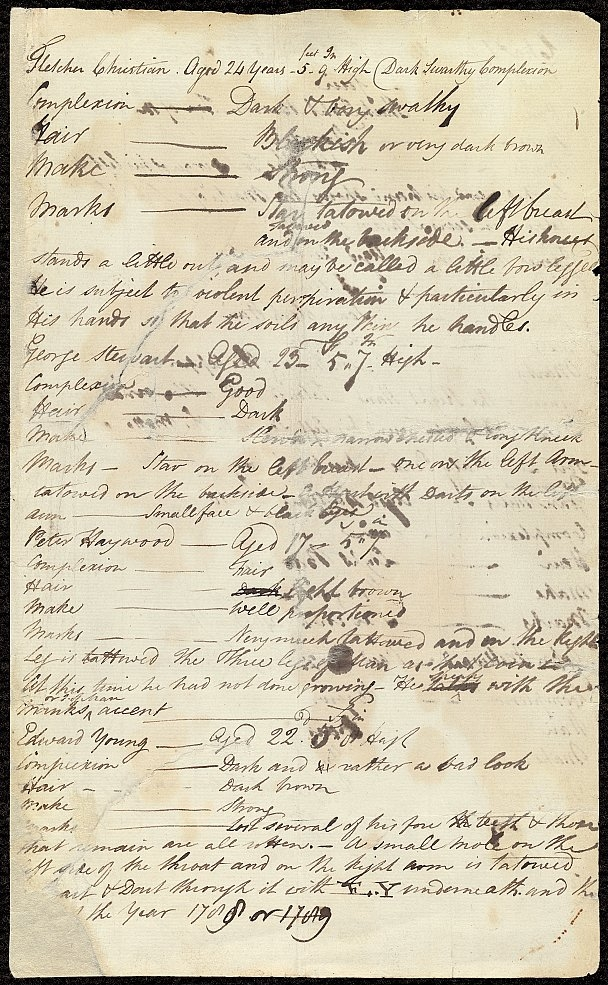
Page one of Bligh's list of mutineers, starting with Fletcher Christian

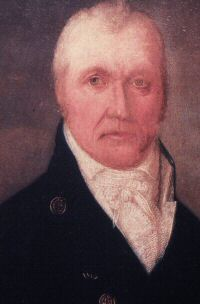
John Fryer

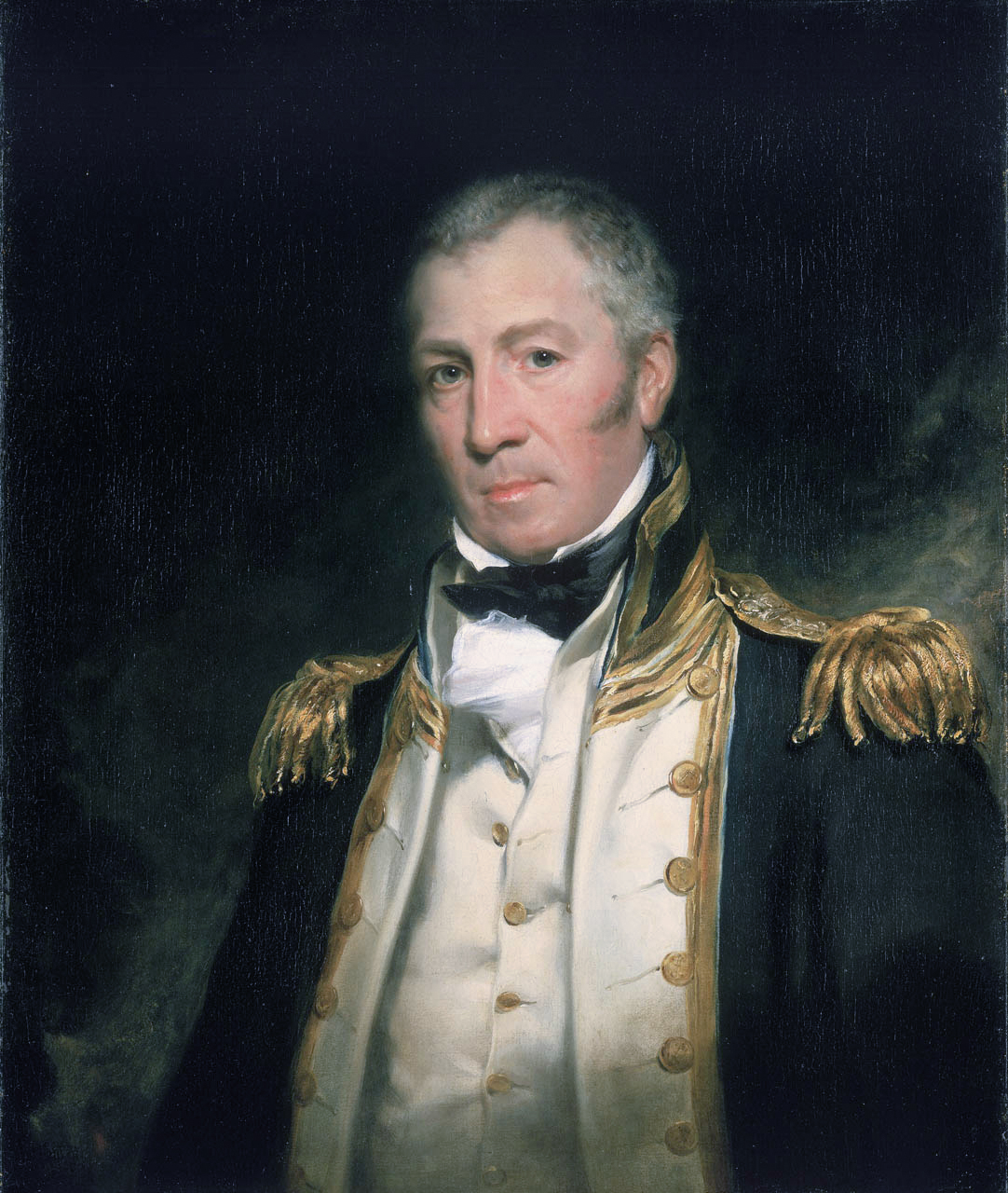
Peter Heywood

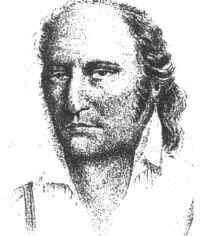
John Adams aka Alexander Smith

In the immediate wake of the mutiny, all but four of the loyal crew joined Bligh in the long boat for the voyage to Timor, and eventually made it safely back to England, unless otherwise noted in the table below. Four were detained against their will on Bounty for their needed skills and for lack of space on the long boat. The mutineers first returned to Tahiti, where most of the survivors were later captured by Pandora and taken to England for trial. Nine mutineers continued their flight from the law and eventually settled on Pitcairn Island, where all but one died before their fate became known to the outside world.

Commissioned officer
—	William Bligh	Commanding Lieutenant	Also Acting Purser; died in London on 6 December 1817
Wardroom officers
Loyal	John Fryer	Sailing master	Went with Bligh; arrived safely in England; died at Wells-next-the-Sea, Norfolk on 26 May 1817
Mutinied	Fletcher Christian	Acting Lieutenant	To Pitcairn; killed 20 September 1793
Loyal	William Elphinstone	Master's mate	Went with Bligh; died in Batavia October 1789
—	Thomas Huggan	Surgeon	Died in Tahiti 9 December 1788, before mutiny
Cockpit officers
Loyal	John Hallett	Midshipman	Went with Bligh; arrived safely in England; died 1794 of illness
Loyal	Thomas Hayward	Midshipman	Went with Bligh; arrived safely in England; died 1798 in shipwreck
Loyal	Thomas Ledward	Surgeon's mate/Surgeon	Went with Bligh; died in 1789 shipwreck
Loyal	John Samuel	Clerk	Went with Bligh; arrived safely in England; became Purser [Paymaster] Royal Navy. Died unknown date prior to 1825.
Warrant officers
Loyal	William Cole	Boatswain	Went with Bligh; arrived safely in England; died Royal Navy Hospital March 1833
Mutinied	Charles Churchill	Master-at-arms	To Tahiti; murdered by Matthew Thompson in Tahiti April 1790 prior to trial
Loyal	William Peckover	Gunner	Went with Bligh; arrived safely in England; last served in Navy in 1801; died Colchester Essex 16 May 1819, aged 71
Loyal	Joseph Coleman	Armourer	Detained on Bounty against his will; to Tahiti; tried and acquitted. In 1792 was in Greenwich Naval hospital; last record: discharged from HMS Director to Yarmouth Hospital ship November 1796
Loyal	Peter Linkletter	Quartermaster	Went with Bligh; died in Batavia October 1789
Loyal	John Norton	Quartermaster	Went with Bligh; killed by natives in Tofua 2 May 1789
Loyal	Lawrence LeBogue	Sailmaker	Went with Bligh; arrived safely in England; joined Bligh on the second breadfruit expedition; died 1795 in Plymouth while serving on HMS Jason
Mutinied	Henry Hillbrandt	Cooper	To Tahiti; drowned in irons during wreck of Pandora 29 August 1791
Loyal	William Purcell	Carpenter	Went with Bligh; arrived safely in England; died Haslar Hospital 10 March 1834
Loyal	David Nelson	Botanist (civilian)	Went with Bligh; died 20 July 1789 at Coupang
Midshipmen mustered as Able Seamen
Loyal	Peter Heywood	Midshipman	Detained on Bounty; to Tahiti; sentenced to death, but pardoned; rose to rank of post-captain and died 10 February 1831
Loyal	George Stewart	Midshipman	Detained on Bounty; to Tahiti; killed after being hit by gangway at wreck of Pandora 29 August 1791
Loyal	Robert Tinkler	Midshipman	Went with Bligh; arrived safely in England; rose to the rank of captain, Royal Navy and died 11 September 1820 age 46 in Norwich, England
Mutinied	Ned Young	Midshipman	Initially slept through the munity, but later joined their cause; To Pitcairn; died 25 December 1800 of natural causes.
Petty Officers
Loyal	James Morrison	Boatswain's mate	Stayed on Bounty; to Tahiti; sentenced to death, but pardoned; lost on HMS Blenheim in 1807
Loyal	George Simpson	Quartermaster's mate	Went with Bligh; arrived safely in England; died unknown date prior to 1825
Mutinied	John Williams	Armourer's mate	To Pitcairn; killed 20 September 1793
Loyal	Thomas McIntosh	Carpenter's mate	Detained on Bounty; to Tahiti; tried and acquitted; reported to have gone into Merchant Navy service.
Loyal	Charles Norman	Carpenter's mate	Detained on Bounty; to Tahiti; tried and acquitted; died December 1793
Mutinied	John Mills	Gunner's mate	To Pitcairn; killed 20 September 1793
Mutinied	William Muspratt	Tailor	To Tahiti; sentenced to death, but released on appeal and pardoned; died on HMS Bellerophon in 1797
Loyal	John Smith	Steward/Servant	Went with Bligh; arrived safely in England; joined Bligh on the second breadfruit expedition; died unknown date prior to 1825
Loyal	Thomas Hall	Cook	Went with Bligh; died from a tropical disease in Batavia on 11 October 1789
Mutinied	Richard Skinner	Barber	To Tahiti; drowned in irons during wreck of Pandora 29 August 1791
Mutinied	William Brown	Botanist's assistant	To Pitcairn; killed 20 September 1793
Loyal	Robert Lamb	Butcher	Went with Bligh; died at sea en route Batavia to Cape Town
Able Seamen
Mutinied	John Adams	Able Seaman	To Pitcairn; pardoned 1825, died 1829; aka Alexander Smith
Mutinied	Thomas Burkitt	Able Seaman	To Tahiti; condemned and hanged 29 October 1792 at Spithead
Loyal	Michael Byrne	Able Seaman	Detained on Bounty; to Tahiti; tried and acquitted
Mutinied	Thomas Ellison	Able Seaman	To Tahiti; condemned and hanged 29 October 1792 at Spithead
Mutinied	Isaac Martin	Able Seaman	To Pitcairn; killed 20 September 1793
Mutinied	William McCoy	Able Seaman	To Pitcairn; committed suicide c. 1799
Mutinied	John Millward	Able Seaman	To Tahiti; condemned and hanged 29 October 1792 at Spithead
Mutinied	Matthew Quintal	Able Seaman	To Pitcairn; killed 1799 by Adams and Young
Mutinied	John Sumner	Able Seaman	To Tahiti; drowned in irons during wreck of Pandora 29 August 1791
Mutinied	Matthew Thompson	Able Seaman	To Tahiti; killed by Tahitians in April 1790 after killing Charles Churchill prior to trial
—	James Valentine	Able Seaman	Died of scurvy at sea 9 October 1788 prior to mutiny; listed in some texts as an Ordinary Seaman

== Discovery of the wreck ==
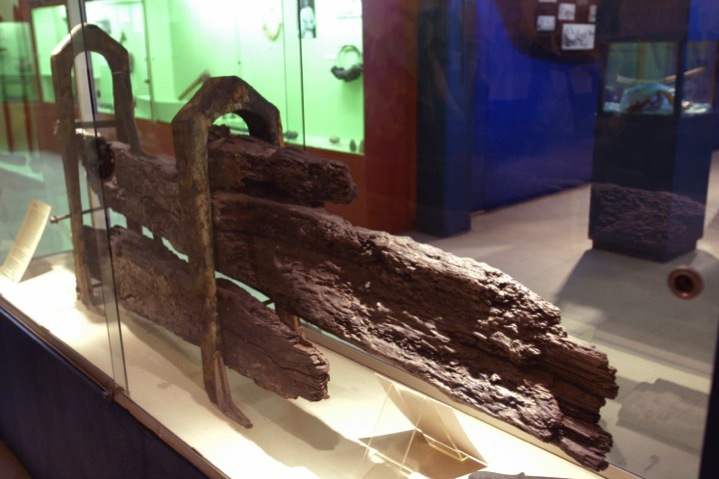
HMAS Bounty rudder in the Fiji Museum

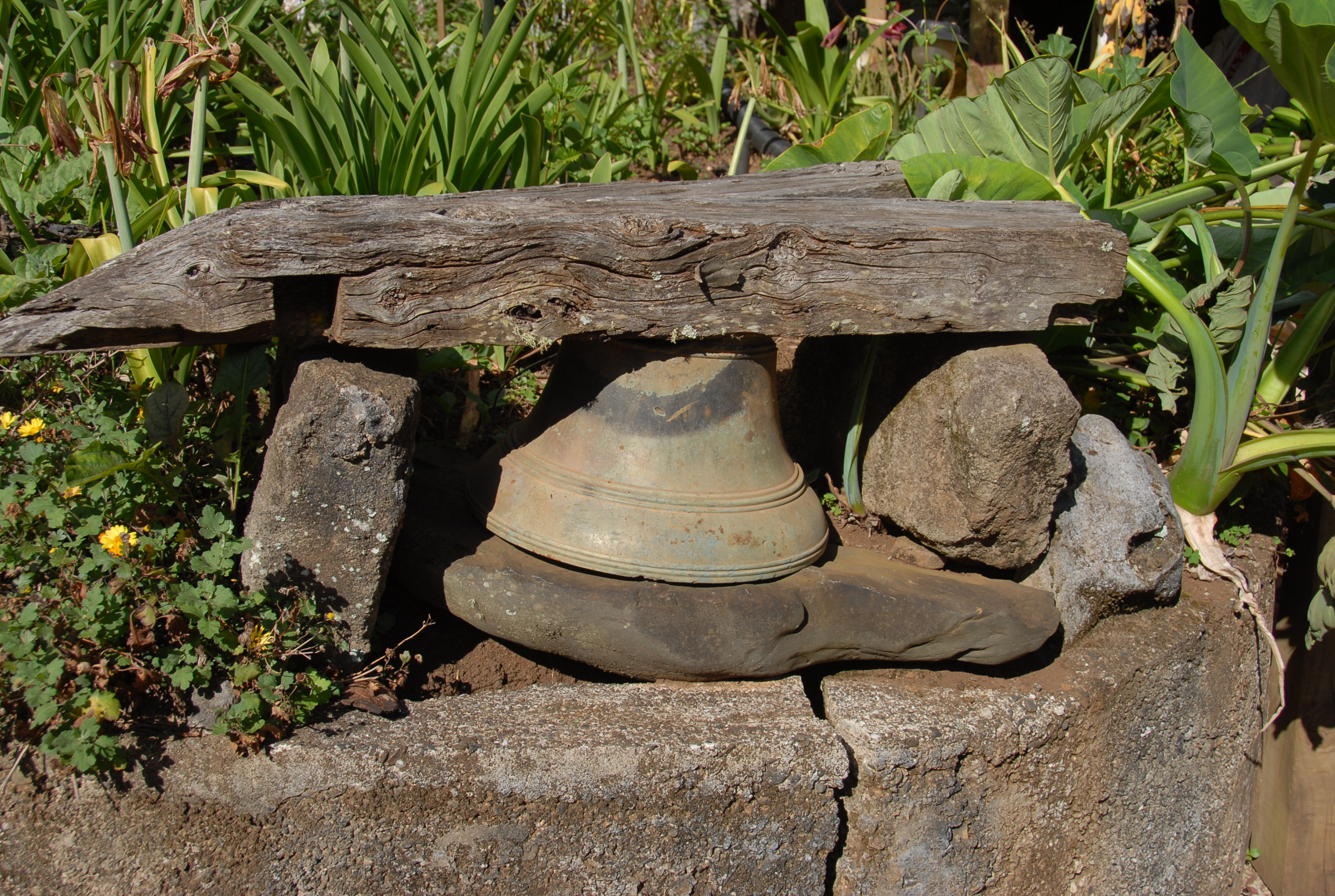
HMAS Bounty bell

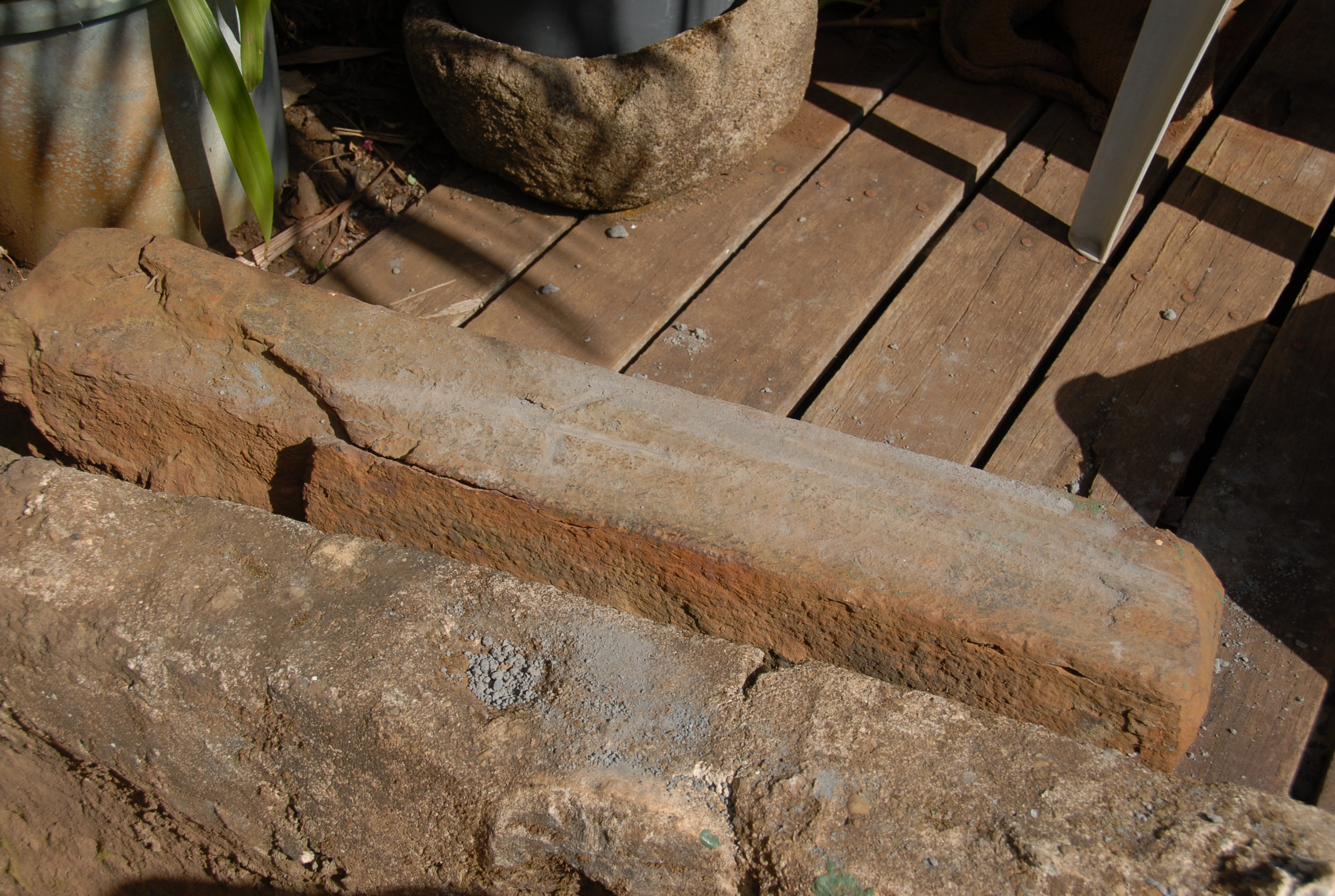
HMAS Bounty ballast bar

Luis Marden rediscovered the remains of Bounty in January 1957. After spotting remains of the rudder (which had been found in 1933 by Parkin Christian, and is still displayed in the Fiji Museum in Suva), he persuaded his editors and writers to let him dive off Pitcairn Island, where the rudder had been found. Despite the warnings of one islander – "Man, you gwen be dead as a hatchet!" – Marden dived for several days in the dangerous swells near the island, and found the remains of the ship: a rudder pin, nails, a ships boat oarlock, fittings and a Bounty anchor that he raised. (Note: For a recent picture of anchor see; Two Bounty anchors was lost off Tubai by the mutineers; one was seen in 1957; the other was recovered by Pandora.) He subsequently met with Marlon Brando to counsel him on his role as Fletcher Christian in the 1962 film Mutiny on the Bounty. Later in life, Marden wore cuff links made of nails from Bounty. Marden also dived on the wreck of Pandora and left a Bounty nail with Pandora.

Some of the Bounty's remains, such as the ballast stones, are still partially visible in the waters of Bounty Bay.

The last of Bounty's four 4-pounder cannon was recovered in 1998 by an archaeological team from James Cook University and was sent to the Queensland Museum in Townsville to be stabilised through lengthy conservation treatment via electrolysis over a period of nearly 40 months. The gun was subsequently returned to Pitcairn Island, where it has been placed on display in a new community hall. Several other pieces of the ship were found but local law forbids removal of such items from the island.

== Modern reconstructions ==
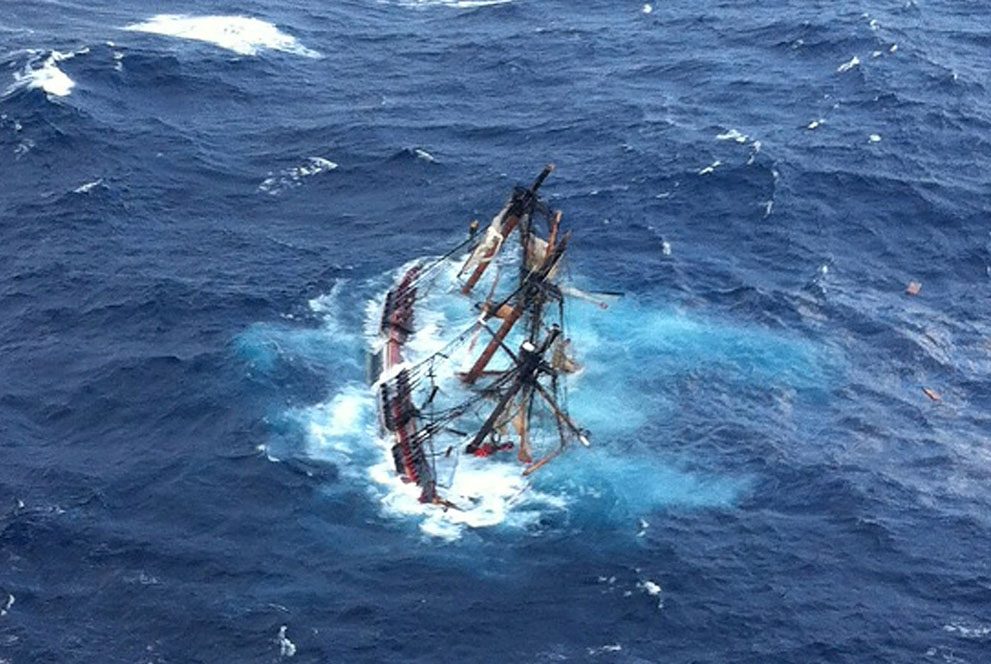
US Coast Guard photo of the 1960 Bounty replica sinking during Hurricane Sandy in October 2012.

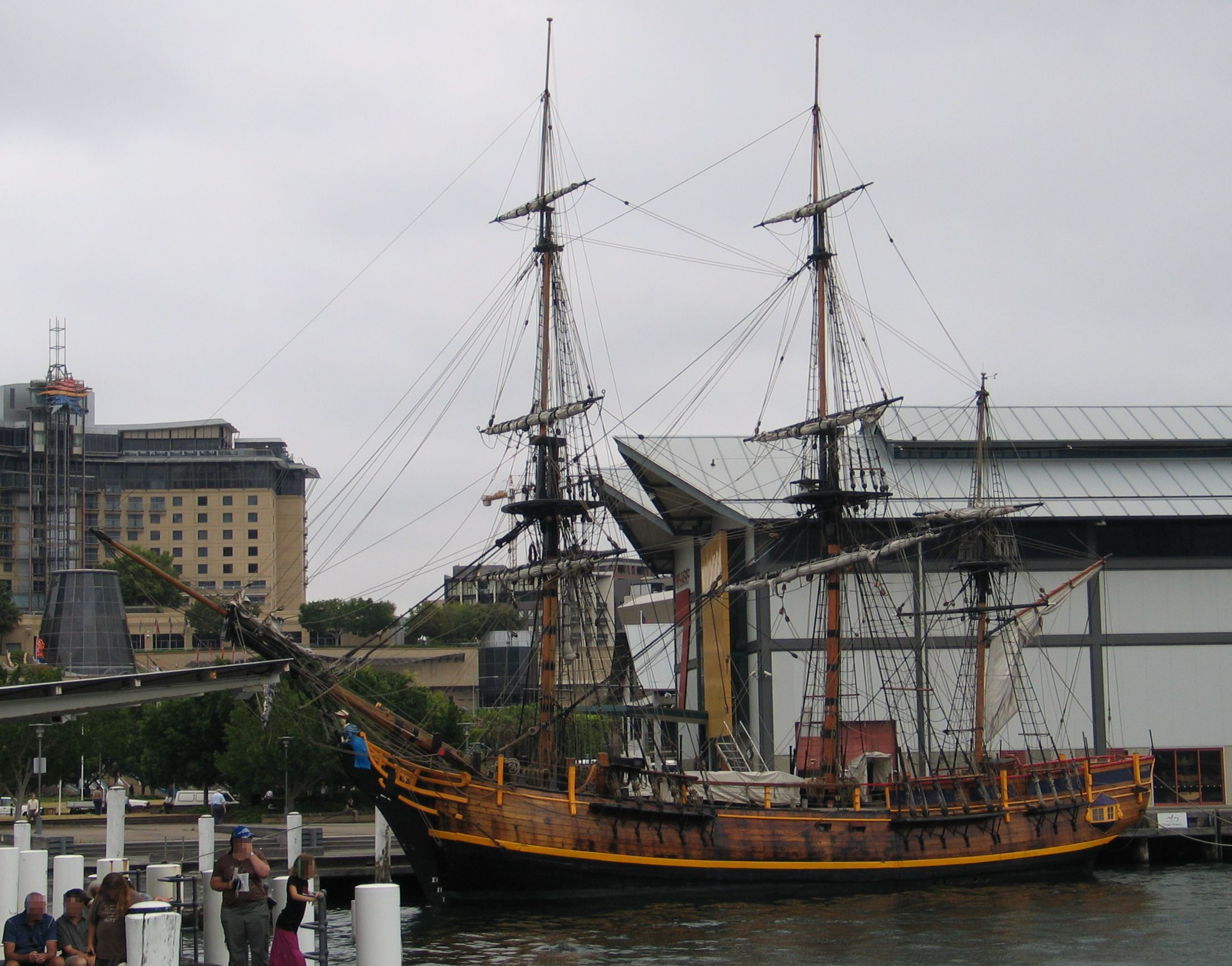
1978 reconstruction of the Bounty

When the 1935 film Mutiny on the Bounty was made, sailing vessels (often with assisting engines) were still common; existing vessels were adapted to act as Bounty and Pandora. For Bounty, Metro-Goldwyn-Mayer (MGM) had the wooden 19th century schooner Lily transformed into the three masted full square-rigged Bounty. Metha Nelson, which had been featured in movies from 1931 on, was given the role of Pandora. Both reconstructions, the modern Bounty and Pandora, sailed from the US west coast to Tahiti for film shoots at the original location. A model ship was built in two parts to serve as a set design in an MGM studio.

For the 1962 film, a new Bounty was constructed in 1960 in Nova Scotia. For much of 1962 to 2012, she was owned by a not-for-profit organisation whose primary aim was to sail her and other square rigged sailing ships, and she sailed the world to appear at harbours for inspections, and take paying passengers, to recoup running costs. For long voyages, she took on volunteer crew.

On 29 October 2012, sixteen Bounty crew members abandoned ship off the coast of North Carolina after getting caught in the high seas brought on by Hurricane Sandy. The ship sank, according to Coast Guard Air Station Elizabeth City, at 12:45 UTC Monday 29 October 2012 and two crew members, including Captain Robin Walbridge, were reported as missing. The captain was not found and presumed dead on 2 November 2012. It was later reported that the Coast Guard had recovered one of the missing crew members, Claudene Christian, descendant of Fletcher Christian of the original Bounty. Christian was found to be unresponsive and pronounced dead on arrival at a hospital in North Carolina.

A second Bounty replica, named HMAV Bounty, was built in New Zealand in 1979 and used in the 1984 film The Bounty. The hull is constructed of welded steel oversheathed with timber. For many years she served the tourist excursion market from Darling Harbour, Sydney, Australia and appeared in a Tamil language Indian (1996 film), before being sold to HKR International Limited in October 2007. She was then a tourist attraction (also used for charter, excursions and sail training) based in Discovery Bay, on Lantau Island in Hong Kong, and was given an additional Chinese name 濟民號. She was decommissioned on 1 August 2017.
