= Rulers of the Sea =

1939 film by Frank Lloyd

- Film poster
- Directed by: Frank Lloyd
- Written by: Frank Cavett; Richard Collins; Talbot Jennings
- Produced by: Frank Lloyd
- Starring: Douglas Fairbanks, Jr. Margaret Lockwood; Will Fyffe; George Bancroft
- Cinematography: Theodor Sparkuhl
- Edited by: Paul Weatherwax
- Music by: Richard Hageman
- Production company: Paramount Pictures
- Distributed by: Paramount Pictures
- Release date: November 8, 1939
- Running time: 96 minutes
- Country: United States
- Language: English
- Budget: at least $1,500,000

Rulers of the Sea is a 1939 American historical drama film directed by Frank Lloyd and starring Douglas Fairbanks Jr., Margaret Lockwood and Will Fyffe. The film's story is based on the voyage of the SS Savannah, the first steamship to cross the North Atlantic, from Britain to the United States. The film was made by Paramount Pictures, but featured Lockwood and Fyffe who were two of the leading stars of the British Gainsborough Pictures studios. The supporting cast features Alan Ladd.

== Plot ==
Fictionalized account of the beginnings of the steam-powered engine and its application for use in the first steamship voyage across the Atlantic Ocean.

Set in the early 19th century, the story centres on the efforts of engineer John Shaw (Will Fyffe) and first mate David Gillespie (Douglas Fairbanks Jr) to build and launch a steamship for a transatlantic voyage.

It depicts the resistance they faced from the traditional sailing industry which views steamships as a threat to their business.

The story highlights the innovation and determination required to introduce new technology as well as the risks, dangers and triumphs involved in pioneering a new mode of transportation.

== Cast ==
- Douglas Fairbanks, Jr. as David 'Davie' Gillespie
- Margaret Lockwood as Mary Shaw
- Will Fyffe as John Shaw
- George Bancroft as Captain Oliver
- Montagu Love as Malcolm Grant
- Vaughan Glaser as Junius Smith
- David Torrence as Donald Fenton
- Lester Matthews as Lt. Roberts
- Alec Craig as Foreman MacNeil
- Barlowe Borland as Magistrate
- Wilson Benge as Campbell
- Harry Allen as Murdock
- Barry Macollum as Miller
- David Cavendish as First Officer Lewis
- David Clyde as Second Mate Evans
- Charles McAvoy as O'Brien
- Alan Ladd as Colin Farrell
- Lawrence Grant as Mr. Negley
- John Power as Captain of 'Dog Star'
- William Haade as A Stoker

== Production ==
The film was one in a series of million-dollar "spectacles" from Paramount. It was based on the history of the Cunard Line. This subject matter was inspired by the success of the movie Lloyd's of London, which led to a series of movies revolving around the history of companies. (Others from this time include Spawn of the North (1938), Western Union (1940), and Hudson Bay Company (1940).)

The film used the writer and director of the hit MGM film Mutiny on the Bounty (1935), Talbot Jennings and Frank Lloyd.

Will Fyffe, British film star, was borrowed from Gainsborough Pictures in the US to play engineer John Shaw. Filming started on his arrival in Hollywood on 19 April 1939. Margaret Lockwood had also been borrowed from Gainborough.

The film used two real ships, the sailing vessel being Metha Nelson.

The film was made with the British audience in mind, so Paramount were worried on the declaration of war.

== Reception ==
Fairbanks Jr called it "a very boring story... very static. Lost a bundle."
