= J Son =

J Son, J'Son, Json, or variations may refer to:

== People ==
- J'Son (singer) (born 1980), American R&B singer
- Json (rapper) (born 1981), American Christian hip-hop musician
- J-Son (born 1985), Brazilian-born Swedish rapper and songwriter
- DJ Jam Master J'Son (born 1986), American musician, music producer, and disc jockey
- J'Sun, American singer and contestant on the fourth season of The Voice

== Other uses ==
- JSON (JavaScript Object Notation), a lightweight computer data interchange format
- J'son (character), a Marvel Comics character

== See also ==
- Jason (disambiguation)
- Son (disambiguation)
- J (disambiguation)
