= This Woman Is Mine =

1941 film by Frank Lloyd

This Woman is Mine
- Directed by: Frank Lloyd
- Screenplay by: Frederick J. Jackson; Seton I. Miller
- Based on: I, James Lewis by Gilbert W. Gabriel
- Produced by: Frank Lloyd; Jack H. Skirball
- Starring: Franchot Tone; John Carroll; Walter Brennan
- Cinematography: Milton Krasner
- Edited by: Edward Curtiss
- Music by: Richard Hageman
- Production company: Frank Lloyd Productions
- Distributed by: Universal Pictures
- Release date: August 22, 1941 (United States)
- Running time: 92 minutes
- Country: United States
- Language: English

This Woman Is Mine is a 1941 American historical adventure film directed by Frank Lloyd and starring Franchot Tone, John Carroll and Walter Brennan. It received one nomination at the 14th Academy Awards, 1942. It was distributed by Universal Pictures. The plot is derived from Gilbert W. Gabriel's 1932 story I, Jack Lewis.

== Plot ==
Three seafaring fur traders fall in love with an attractive stowaway discovered aboard their ship. This adds a romantic element to the historic journey (1810–1811) of the ship Tonquin from New York via Cape Horn to Vancouver Island in Canada, where she eventually was destroyed deliberately.

== Cast ==
- Franchot Tone as Robert Stevens
- John Carroll as Ovide de Montigny
- Walter Brennan as Captain Jonathan Thorne
- Carol Bruce as Julie Morgan
- Nigel Bruce as Duncan MacDougall
- Paul Hurst as Second Mate Mumford
- Frank Conroy as First Mate Fox
- Leo G. Carroll as Angus 'Sandy' McKay
- Abner Biberman as Lamazie
- Sig Ruman as John Jacob Astor
- Morris Ankrum as Roussel
- Louis Mercier as Marcel La Fantasie
- Philip Charbert as Franchere, Seaman
- Ignacio Saenz as Matouna, Indian Boy
- Ray Beltram as Chief Nakoomis
- Charles Judels as Cafe Proprietor
- Jay Silverheels as Indian Marauder
- Dale Van Sickel as Seaman
- George Magrill as Seaman

== Accolade ==
Richard Hageman was nominated at the 14th Academy Awards, 1942, for Best Music Score of a Dramatic Picture.

== Production notes ==
Main production venues were Santa Catalina Island (California) and Lake Tahoe.

The ship Tonquin was represented by Metha Nelson.

== Bibliography ==
- Fetrow, Alan G. Feature Films, 1940-1949: a United States Filmography. McFarland, 1994.
