= Jason (surname) =

Jason is a surname. Notable people with the surname include:

- Anju Jason (born 1987), first Marshalese sportsperson to qualify for the Olympics (2008)
- Sir David Jason (born 1940), British actor
- Harvey Jason (born 1940, British actor
- Leigh Jason (1904–1979), American film director and writer
- Nathan Jason (born 2002), Australian para-athlete
- Peter Jason (1944–2025), American actor
- Rick Jason (1923–2000), American actor

== See also ==
- Jason (given name)
- Jason (disambiguation)
