= Botafogo Futebol Clube (SP) =

Brazilian association football club based in Ribeirão Preto, São Paulo, Brazil

Botafogo-SP
- Full name: Botafogo Futebol Clube
- Nicknames: Pantera (Panther); Botinha (Little Bota); Pantera da Mogiana (Mogiana's Panther); Maior do interior (Biggest of Inland)
- Founded: 12 October 1918; 108 years ago
- Stadium: Santa Cruz
- Capacity: 29,292
- SAF Owner: BFC (60%)
- President: Eduardo Esteves
- Head coach: Cláudio Tencati
- League: Campeonato Brasileiro Série B Campeonato Paulista
- 2025 2025: Série B, 16th of 20; Paulista, 13th of 16
- Website: botafogofutebolsa.com.br
Home colors	Away colors	Third colors

Botafogo Futebol Clube, commonly referred to as Botafogo-SP or Botafogo de Ribeirão Preto, is a Brazilian association football club in Ribeirão Preto, São Paulo. They currently play in the Série B, the second tier of Brazilian football, as well as in the Campeonato Paulista Série A1, the top tier of the São Paulo state football league.

The club's home colours are red, white and black and the team mascot is a panther.

== History ==
In the beginning of the century, the city of Ribeirão Preto had at least three clubs: União, Paulistano Tiberense and Ideal Futebol Clube. In 1918, representatives of Ideal, proposed a merger of the clubs in the neighborhood. Besides the members of the boards of the three clubs, employees from the old Mogiana Railroad, and employees from the Antarctica Paulista Company participated in the meeting.

There was a consensus regarding the formation of a new club that would represent the neighborhood, but the choice of the name did not reach a conclusion. After a heated discussion, one member was quoted as saying: "Either you define the name or just 'put fire' (Bota Fogo) in everything and end this story ..." Because of what that member said, the club's name discussion had an unexpected conclusion. The threat of the incendiary leader ended up helping in the choice of name. The proposal was accepted, and in 1918 the club was named Botafogo Futebol Clube (contrary to popular belief, Botafogo of Ribeirão Preto was not inspired by Botafogo Football Club of Rio de Janeiro, defunct in 1942).

Botafogo's debut was in Franca, against local club Esporte Clube Fulgêncio. The match ended 1–0 in favor of the team from Ribeirão Preto. The first title of Botafogo was the São Paulo State Countryside Championship in 1927. In 1956, the club won the Ribeirão Preto Centennial Cup, beating Commercial in the final 4–2. Botafogo also won the Undefeated Cup after a series of 19 games unbeaten. In the same year, the team was also champion of the Second Division of the São Paulo State Championship.

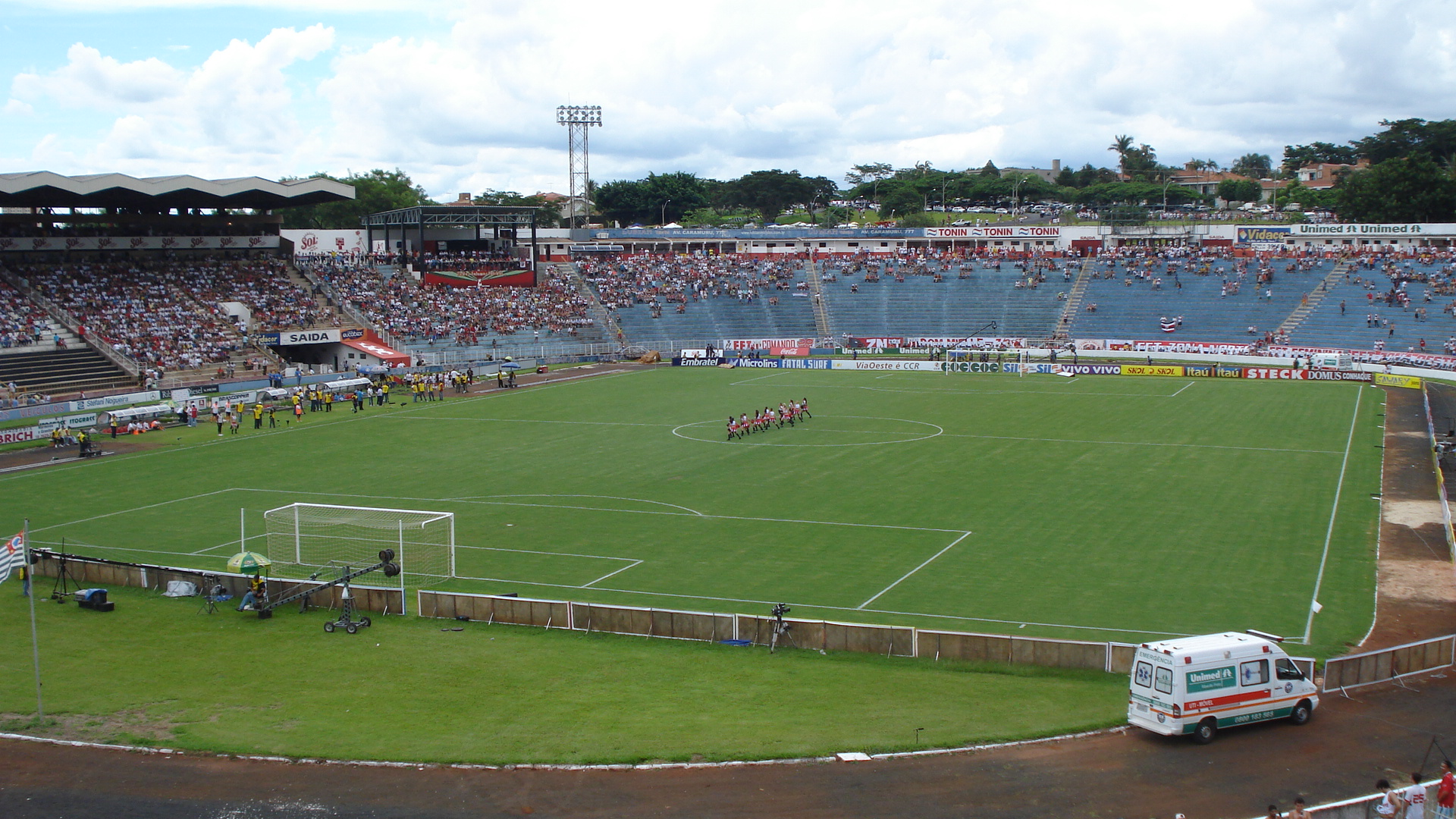
Estádio Santa Cruz, owned by Botafogo de Ribeirão Preto, a major stadium of Brazil

In the year 1977, Botafogo won the São Paulo City Cup (first stage of the São Paulo State Championship), playing the final against São Paulo Futebol Clube, and beating the opponent team after normal time and overtime. The game ended 0-0 giving the title to Botafogo, as the club have done better a campaign in the competition.

In the 1990s, the club was runners-up twice, thus being promoted twice in the national league pyramid: the Série C in 1996, and Série B in 1998. In the following year, Botafogo was relegated and in 2000 competed in the Copa João Havelange, in the Yellow Module (equivalent to the Série B). In 2001, Botafogo was São Paulo State Championship's runners-up, an extraordinary achievement for a countryside club, playing in one of the most competitive leagues in the football world. In 2002, it was relegated again, this time to the Série C. Botafogo was relegated to the São Paulo State Championship Série A3 in 2005 because of problems fielding a player without registration with the Federação Paulista de Futebol, the famous "tapetão." In the following year, they won access to the São Paulo State Championship Série A2 after winning the Série A3.

In the 2018 edition, Botafogo finished 1st in Group B and achieved promotion to Campeonato Brasileiro Série B after defeating Botafogo-PB in the penalty shootout at the quarter-finals. They lost to Cuiabá in the next round, as all the semifinalist were already promoted.

== Current squad ==
As of 21 November 2026

Note: Flags indicate national team as defined under FIFA eligibility rules; some limited exceptions apply. Players may hold more than one non-FIFA nationality.

No.	Pos.	Nation	Player
1	GK	BRA	Victor Souza
2	DF	BRA	Jonathan
3	DF	BRA	Ericson
4	DF	BRA	Gustavo Vilar (captain)
7	FW	BRA	Kelvin
8	MF	BRA	Everton Morelli
9	FW	BRA	Hygor
10	MF	BRA	Rafael Gava
12	GK	BRA	Jordan
13	DF	BRA	Wallace
14	DF	BRA	Carlos Eduardo
15	DF	BRA	Gui Mariano (on loan from Cuiabá)
16	MF	BRA	Matheus Sales

No.	Pos.	Nation	Player
17	FW	BRA	Guilherme Queiróz
18	FW	BRA	Arthur Caíke
20	MF	BRA	Yuri Felipe
21	FW	BRA	Jadson
22	DF	BRA	Gabriel Inocêncio
23	FW	BRA	Wesley Santos
27	DF	BRA	Darlan
28	MF	BRA	Marco Antônio (on loan from Vila Nova)
29	MF	BRA	Thiaguinho
30	FW	BRA	Zé Hugo (on loan from Azuriz)
31	DF	BRA	Pedrinho
33	MF	BRA	Erik Rebello
34	DF	BRA	Badaró

=== Out on loan ===
Note: Flags indicate national team as defined under FIFA eligibility rules; some limited exceptions apply. Players may hold more than one non-FIFA nationality.

No.	Pos.	Nation	Player

== Stadium ==
One of the biggest stadiums on the State of São Paulo and one of the most modern on the countryside, Estádio Santa Cruz was inaugurated in 1968, with a maximum capacity of 29.292 people.

On the year of 2019 the Stadium went on modernization and today an sector of the stadium is called Arena Nicnet Eurobike with the capacity to hold 15.000 people, the modernization also made the stadium suitable for many music concerts from bands from all around the globe such as Kiss, Iron Maiden, Guns'n Roses and more.

== Rival ==
Botafogo de Ribeirão Preto's greatest rival is Comercial, which is also a Ribeirão Preto club. The derby between the two clubs is known as Come-Fogo.

== Supporters ==
- Botafogo is the most supported club in its region, with about three million inhabitants, and a proven 68% (survey conducted by Sports Brunoro in 1998). It has the third largest private stadium in Brazil, "Santa Cruz", and the thirty-seventh in the world with a capacity of 50,000 people.
- The club was the inspiration for the founding of the Botafogo of Cordinhã, Portugal in 1971. Besides adopting the name, the Portuguese club has a similar logo as Botafogo de Ribeirão Preto's and sport club Paulistinha city São Carlos, Brazil.
- The fan club, Fiel Força Tricolor (or FFT), founded in 1992, has one of the largest flags in Brazil, and the eighth largest in the world, measuring 135x33 meters, 90% painted. In 2008, the FFT participated in the carnival parade as a block of Ribeirão Preto, celebrating the 90th anniversary of the founding of Botafogo. The current president of the FFT is Andrew Trinity fans.
- In 2009, there is more of a fan club Botafogo FC Called Youth Force, the new group of fans will be present at all club games. Founded by former president of Tri Márcio True Terror Force, the Youth Force comes as a further incentive to the club, always striving for peace in stages.

== Mascot ==
The panther has as main features the strength and flexibility in the animal world. In the football field, Botafogo won the nickname "Pantera da Mogiana (Mogiana's Panther)" after beating clubs from that region of São Paulo state. They won the Campeonato do Interior in 1927, making justice to the club's nickname.

== Honours ==
=== Official tournaments ===
National
Competitions	Titles	Seasons
Campeonato Brasileiro Série D	1	2015
State
Competitions	Titles	Seasons
Campeonato Paulista Série A3	1	2006

=== Others tournaments ===
==== International ====
- Argentina International Tournament (4): 1962, 1969, 1971, 1972
- Pentagonal of Guatemala (1): 1966
- Argentina's Sesquicentennial (1): 1972
- Damian Castillo Duran Cup (1): 1982
- Argentine Sports League (1): 1984
- Carmencita Granados Tournament (1): 1984

==== State ====
- Campeonato Paulista Série A2 (2): 1927, 1956

==== City ====
- Taça Sudan (1): 1933
- Taça Ribanco (1): 1969
- Taça Ribeirão Preto (1): 1974
- Taça Centenária Ribeirão Preto (1): 1956
- Troféu Jornalista Renê Andrade (1): 2014

=== Runners-up ===
- Campeonato Brasileiro Série B (1): 1998
- Campeonato Brasileiro Série C (1): 1996
- Campeonato Paulista (1): 2001
- Copa Paulista (2): 2014, 2021
- Campeonato Paulista Série A2 (3): 1928, 1950, 1955

== CBF (Brazilian Football Confederation) Ranking ==
- Position: 37th
- Points: 554 points (Ranking created by the Confederação Brasileira de Futebol, it awards points to clubs that participate in national competitions).

== Presidents ==
- Eduardo Esteves 2022-
- Alfredo Cristóvão 2021-2022
- Osvaldo Festucci 2020-2021
- Dmitri Abreu 2019–2020
- Gérson Engracia Garcia 2015–2017
- Rogério Cassius Bariza 2014–2015
- Gustavo Assed 2012–2014
- Silvio Martins 2012
- Luiz Pereira 2010–2011
- Virgílio Pires Martins 2008–2009
- Luiz Pereira 2006–2007
- Walcris da Silva 2002–2005
- Luiz Carlos Bianchi 2002
- Ricardo Christiano Ribeiro 1998–2001
- Laerte Alvez (1994–1997)
- José Antonio Montefeltro 1990–1993
- Osvaldo Silva 1986–1989
- Faustino Jarruche 1984–1985
- Miguel Mauad Neto 1982–1983
- Benedito Sciência da Silva 1980–1981
- Atílio Benedini Neto 1976–1979
- Faustino Jarruche 1974–1975
- Ricardo Christiano Ribeiro 1972–1973
- Walter Strambi 1970–1971
- Osvaldo Silva 1969
- Farjala Moisés/Osvaldo Silva 1968
- Francisco Oranges 1967
- Waldomiro da Silva 1956–1966
- João Rucian Ruiz 1955
- Costábile Romano 1953–1954
- Luiz Manoel Marinho 1952
- Costábile Romano 1949–1951
- Osvaldo de Abreu Sampaio/Durvalino Cened 1948
- Domingos Baptista Spinelli 1947
- José Elias de Almeida 1944–1946
- Arthur Fernandes de Oliveira 1942–1943
- Mario Marques 1941
- Adelmo Silva 1940
- Francisco Prata 1939
- Edison Dutra Barroso 1938
- Adriano dos Santos 1937
- Luiz Pereira 1936
- José de Magalhães 1935
- Adriano dos Santos 1934
- Francisco Prata 1931–1933
- Antonio Augusto da Silva 1929–1930
- Adriano dos Santos 1925–1928
- Francisco Prata 1924
- Alvino Grotax 1922–1923
- José Novas 1920–1921
- Pedro Aguiar / Egydio Cabral 1919
- Joaquim Gagliano 1918
