= Lily (1882 ship) =

Schooner in Pacific trade and Hollywood movies

History

United States
- Name: Lily
- Builder: Dickie Brothers in San Francisco
- Completed: 1882
- Refit: 1934

General characteristics
- Type: Schooner - frigate - schooner
- Length: 31.25 m (102 ft 6 in)
- Beam: 8.78 m (28 ft 10 in)
- Draft: 2.68 m (8 ft 10 in)

Lily was a two-masted schooner (1882) which in 1934 was modified for use as the 18th century full-rigged ship HMS Bounty in the 1935 film Mutiny on the Bounty with Clark Gable and Charles Laughton.

== Origin ==
Lily was designed by the shipyard Dickie Brothers in San Francisco and built in 1882 for the shipping company J. C. Hawley. She had a sister ship named Ivy.

United States west coast newspapers reported about the career of Lily. Right after the vessel's launch, it was noticed that her rigging was too large. So, eleven feet (3.4 m) were taken off her main mast, and the foremast was shortened accordingly. In 1895, she was converted from a sealer to a society racer. In January 1909, coming from Umpqua River, Oregon, she had to weather a storm outside San Francisco.

Lily had more than one movie "career". The first ended in 1921, when another sale was announced. After a short stint in Mexico, a man named Captain All acquired the schooner for business in Nicaragua. It appears that this business, including liquor transport, was not all legal; Captain All lost the vessel to the state of Canada.

== Film business ==
In the late 1920s, Lily was active in the film business again. Amongst others, she appeared in the movies The Single Standard, a silent film with Greta Garbo, and The Ship from Shanghai, still in schooner rig.

Lily was eventually acquired by the film production company Metro-Goldwyn-Mayer who had her rebuilt by the Wilmington Boat Works in Wilmington, California in 1934 to resemble the three-masted full-rigged ship Bounty in Mutiny on the Bounty. For film shoots at the original locations, Lily/Bounty sailed to Tahiti and back, together with the second ship of the production, Nanuk, which represented the historic frigate HMS Pandora.

Only in 1946, there is a report stating that her "film career" came to an end:

In the last three months, anchored off Cabrillo beach, the schooner Lily, for that is her true name, has had some of the Hollywood gingerbread removed and her original schooner rig restored.

— Maritime News, San Pedro News Pilot, July 25, 1946

Several photos and sketches of Lily can be found in JaySea's blog The First Bounty Replica.
