= Richard Hageman =

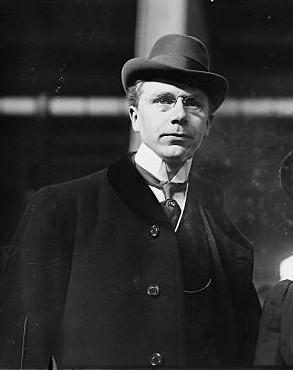
- Hageman in 1909

Background information
- Born: Richard Hageman; July 9, 1881; Leeuwarden, Friesland, Netherlands
- Died: March 6, 1966 (aged 84) Beverly Hills, California, United States
- Genres: 20th-century classical music Film scores
- Occupations: Composer, songwriter, conductor, pianist, actor
- Instrument: Piano
- Years active: 1899–1954
- Formerly of: John Ford, Frank Lloyd, Merian C. Cooper

Richard Hageman (9 July 1881 – 6 March 1966) was a Dutch-born American conductor, pianist, and composer.

== Biography ==
Richard Hageman was born in Leeuwarden, Friesland, Netherlands. He was the son of Maurits Hageman of Zutphen, a violinist, pianist and conductor, and of Hester Westerhoven of Amsterdam, a singer who performed under the name Francisca Stoetz. A child prodigy, he was a concert pianist by the age of six. He studied at the conservatories of Amsterdam and Brussels. As a young man he was an accompanist for singers and with the Nederlandsche Opera, which he conducted for the first time in 1899. He became the artistic director briefly in 1903, the same year in which he married the soprano Rosina van Ophemert, who took the stage name Rosina van Dyke/van Dyck (Rosina van Dijk was the maiden name of her grandmother). For a short time Hageman was accompanist to Mathilde Marchesi in Paris. He travelled to the United States in 1906 to accompany Yvette Guilbert on a national tour. He stayed and eventually became an American citizen in 1925. Rosina sang at the Metropolitan Opera, but the couple had an acrimonious divorce in 1916. His second and third wives were also sopranos—Renee Thornton and Eleanore Rogers.

He was a conductor and pianist for the Metropolitan Opera between 1908 and 1922, and 1935-1936, coach of the opera department at the Curtis Institute from 1925 to 1930, and music director of the Chicago Civic Opera and the Ravinia Park Opera for seven years. Hageman was a coach in voice and collaborative at the Chicago Musical College in the 1920s, where one of his notable piano students was Ray Turner, who went on to play with the Paul Whiteman Orchestra, worked as the staff pianist at Paramount Studios for over 20 years, and was a popular recording and concert artist.

Hageman was a guest conductor at orchestras such as the Chicago, Philadelphia, and Los Angeles symphony orchestras. He conducted the Philadelphia Orchestra summer concerts for four years, and from 1938-1943 he conducted at the Hollywood Bowl summer concerts.

He is known to the film community for his work as an actor and film score composer, most notably for his work on several John Ford films in the late 1930s and after the war in the late 1940s. He shared an Academy Award for his score to Ford's 1939 western Stagecoach and was nominated for the score of This Woman Is Mine (1941). He played minor roles in eleven movies, for example as opera conductor Carlo Santi in The Great Caruso. He became a member of ASCAP in 1950.

Hageman composed some larger concert works for voice. His 1931 opera Caponsacchi, first performed in Freiburg with the title Tragödie in Arezzo in 1932, was staged at the Metropolitan Opera in 1937 with Mario Chamlee in the title role. His "concert drama" The Crucible was performed in Los Angeles in 1943. While his large musical compositions are rarely heard today, a few of his art songs are well-known and highly regarded, especially "Do Not Go, My Love", a setting of a Rabindranath Tagore poem.

He was a National Patron of Delta Omicron, an international professional music fraternity. He died, aged 84, in Beverly Hills.

== Larger musical works and chamber music ==
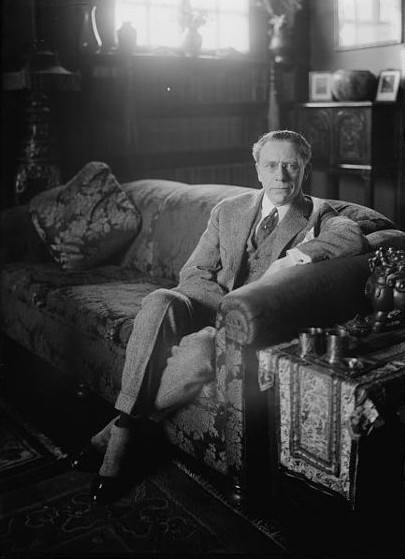
Richard Hageman

Stage:

- Caponsacchi (Op. 3, R. Browning), 1931
- I Hear America Call (ballad, R.V. Grossman), Bar, SATB, orch, 1942
- The Crucible (oratorio, B.C. Kennedy), 1943

Orchestra:

- Overture 'In a Nutshell'; Suite, str

Chamber:

- October Musings, violin and piano, G. Schirmer, 1937
- Recit and Romance, vc, pf, 1961

== Published songs ==
- Do Not Go, My Love (Rabindranath Tagore), Winthrop Rogers/G. Schirmer, 1917
- May Night (Tagore), 1917
- The Cunning Little Thing (Unknown Author), Winthrop Rogers, 1917
- At the Well (Tagore), Winthrop Rogers/G. Schirmer, 1919
- Happiness (Jean Ingelow), Winthrop Rogers/G. Schirmer, 1917/1920
- Charity (Emily Dickinson), G. Schirmer, 1921
- Nature's Holiday (T. Nash), 1921
- Ton coeur est un tombeau (Jacques Boria), G. Schirmer 1921
- Animal Crackers (C. Morley), G. Schirmer, 1922
- Evening (Anonymous text), Ricordi, 1922
- Christ Went Up Into the Hills (Katherine Adams), Carl Fischer, 1924
- Me Company Along (James Stephens), Carl Fischer, 1925
- Grief (Ernest Dowson), Carl Fischer, 1928
- Dawn shall over Lethe Break (Hilaire Belloc), Boosey & Hawkes, 1934
- The Donkey (G. K. Chesterton), Boosey & Hawkes, 1934
- The Little Dancers (Laurence Binyon), Boosey & Hawkes, 1935
- The Night Has a Thousand Eyes (F. W. Bourdillon), Boosey & Hawkes, 1935
- Christmas Eve, A Joyful Song (Joyce Kilmer), Galaxy, 1936 (arranged for mixed chorus by Philip James, Galaxy, 1937)
- The Rich Man (Franklin P. Adams), Galaxy, 1937
- Song without Words (vocalise for coloratura voice with piano), Carl Fischer, 1937
- This Thing I do: a soliloquy for baritone voice with piano accompaniment (Arthur Goodrich), Carl Fischer, 1937
- Music I Heard with You (Conrad Aiken), Galaxy, 1938
- Sundown (Lew Sarett), Carl Fischer, 1938 and 1942
- To a Golden-haired girl (Vachel Lindsay), Carl Fischer, 1938
- Miranda (Hilaire Belloc), Galaxy, 1940
- Mother (Margaret Widdemer), Galaxy, 1940
- Love in the winds (Richard Hovey), Galaxy, 1941
- Little Things (Witter Bynner), Galaxy, 1943
- Voices (Witter Bynner), Galaxy, 1943
- Don Juan Gomez (Elizabeth Jane Coatsworth), Galaxy, 1944
- Fear not the Night (Robert Nathan), Carl Fischer, 1944
- Lift Thou the Burdens, Father, a sacred song (Katherine Call Simonds), Galaxy, 1944
- En una noche serena/Alone in the night (Andres de Segurola, tr. Robert B. Falk), Galaxy, 1945
- Contrasts (Elizabeth Jane Coatsworth), Galaxy, 1946
- The Fiddler of Dooney (William Butler Yeats), G. Schirmer, 1946
- A Lady comes to an Inn (Elizabeth Jane Coatsworth), Galaxy, 1947
- The Fox and the Raven (Guy Wetmore Carryl), Galaxy, 1948
- The Summons (Tagore), Galaxy, 1949
- Is it you? (Robert Nathan), Galaxy, 1951
- Trade Winds (John Masefield), Galaxy, 1952
- Scherzetto (Alfred Kreymborg), Galaxy, 1952
- All Paths Lead to you (Blanche Shoemaker Wagstaff), Galaxy, 1953
- Let me Grow Lovely (Karle Wilson Baker), Carl Fischer, 1953
- Sleep Sweet (Ellen Huntington Gates), Galaxy, 1953
- Walk slowly (Adelaide Love), Carl Fischer, 1953
- I see His Blood upon the Rose (Joseph M. Plunkett), Galaxy, 1954
- Velvet Shoes (Elinor Wylie), Galaxy, 1954
- How to go and Forget (Edwin Markham), G. Schirmer, 1956
- Praise (Seumas O'Sullivan), G. Schirmer, 1956
- Under the Willows: Shoshone love song (Mary Hunter Austin), G. Schirmer, 1957
- When the Wind is Low (Cale Young Rice), Galaxy, 1957
- Die Stadt/The Town (Theodor Storm, tr. Robert Nathan), G. Schirmer, 1958
- Betterliebe/Beggar's Love (Theodor Storm, tr. Robert Nathan), G. Schirmer, 1958
- Am Himmelstor/At Heaven's Door (Conrad F. Meyer, tr. Robert Nathan), G. Schirmer, 1958
- Nocturne (Jean Moréas, tr. Robert Nathan), G. Schirmer, 1960
- So love returns, (Robert Nathan), Ricordi, 1960

== Film scores ==
Hageman is credited for the scores of about 20 films, and his compositions have been used in many additional films.

Seven of the scores were for films directed by John Ford; Kathryn Marie Kalinak has written that Ford "got great work out of the people he worked with, and often those he was hardest on produced the best work of their careers. One of those was Richard Hageman, the Philadelphia Orchestra notwithstanding."

- Stagecoach (1939)
- The Howards of Virginia (1940)
- The Long Voyage Home (1940)
- The Frozen Ghost (1945)
- The Fugitive (1947)
- Fort Apache (1948)
- 3 Godfathers (1948)
- She Wore a Yellow Ribbon (1949)
- Wagon Master (1950).
- Adventure in Vienna (1952)
