= Jadson (footballer, born 2005) =

Brazilian footballer (born 2005)

Personal information
- Full name: Jadson Alves de Lima
- Date of birth: 10 August 2005 (age 21)
- Place of birth: Várzea Grande, Brazil
- Height: 1.78 m (5 ft 10 in)
- Position: Forward

Team information
- Current team: Botafogo-SP

Youth career
- Cuiabá
- 2023–2024: → Atlético Mineiro (loan)

Senior career*
Years	Team	Apps	(Gls)
2023–2026	Cuiabá	38	(0)
2026	→ Operário (loan)	7	(0)
2026–	Botafogo-SP	3	(0)
- * Club domestic league appearances and goals as of 18 November 2026

Jadson Alves de Lima (born 10 August 2005), simply known as Jadson, is a Brazilian professional footballer who plays as a forward for Botafogo-SP.

== Career ==
Born in Várzea Grande, Mato Grosso, Jadson was a Cuiabá youth graduate. He made his first team debut on 16 February 2023, coming on as a second-half substitute for Jonathan Cafú in a 3–1 Campeonato Mato-Grossense away win over Nova Mutum.

On 4 August 2023, Jadson was loaned to Atlético Mineiro and was initially assigned to the under-20 squad. He returned to his parent club in February 2024, after the Copa São Paulo de Futebol Júnior.

Jadson made his Série A debut with Dourado on 3 July 2024, again replacing Cafú in a 2–1 home loss to Botafogo.

== Career statistics ==
As of 7 December 2024.

Appearances and goals by club, season and competition
Club	Season	League			State League		Cup		Continental		Other		Total	
Club	Season	Division	Apps	Goals	Apps	Goals	Apps	Goals	Apps	Goals	Apps	Goals	Apps	Goals
Cuiabá	2023	Série A	0	0	1	0	0	0	—		—		1	0
Cuiabá	2024	Série A	6	0	0	0	0	0	0	0	4 (Note: Appearance(s) in Copa FMF)	0	10	0
Career total			6	0	1	0	0	0	0	0	4	0	11	0

== Honours ==
Cuiabá

- Campeonato Mato-Grossense: 2023
