= Jason Jr. =

Remotely operated vehicle prototype

Jason Junior, also called JJ, was a small remotely operated vehicle (ROV) designed and built by the Deep Submergence Laboratory at the Woods Hole Oceanographic Institute (WHOI). Jason Jr. was a prototype for a larger, more capable ROV named Jason, which was being developed to complement the Argo uncrewed undersea video camera sled.

Jason Jr. was first used in the exploration of the wreck of the RMS Titanic in 1985, during which it was attached to and controlled from aboard the DSV Alvin, a United States Navy crewed deep-ocean research submersible operated by WHOI. The ROV was connected to the submersible by a 300 feet (91 m) fiber optic cable, and allowed scientists to explore and photograph areas of the shipwreck that the submersible could not access. The ROV was deployed from a metal cage attached to the front of Alvin, and controlled remotely by a pilot inside the submersible.

Jason Jr. was lost at sea in late 1991, when a barge carrying it and other equipment to the Galápagos Islands sank in the Pacific Ocean during the Jason III expedition.
