= Jason (ROV) =

Two-body remotely operated vehicle

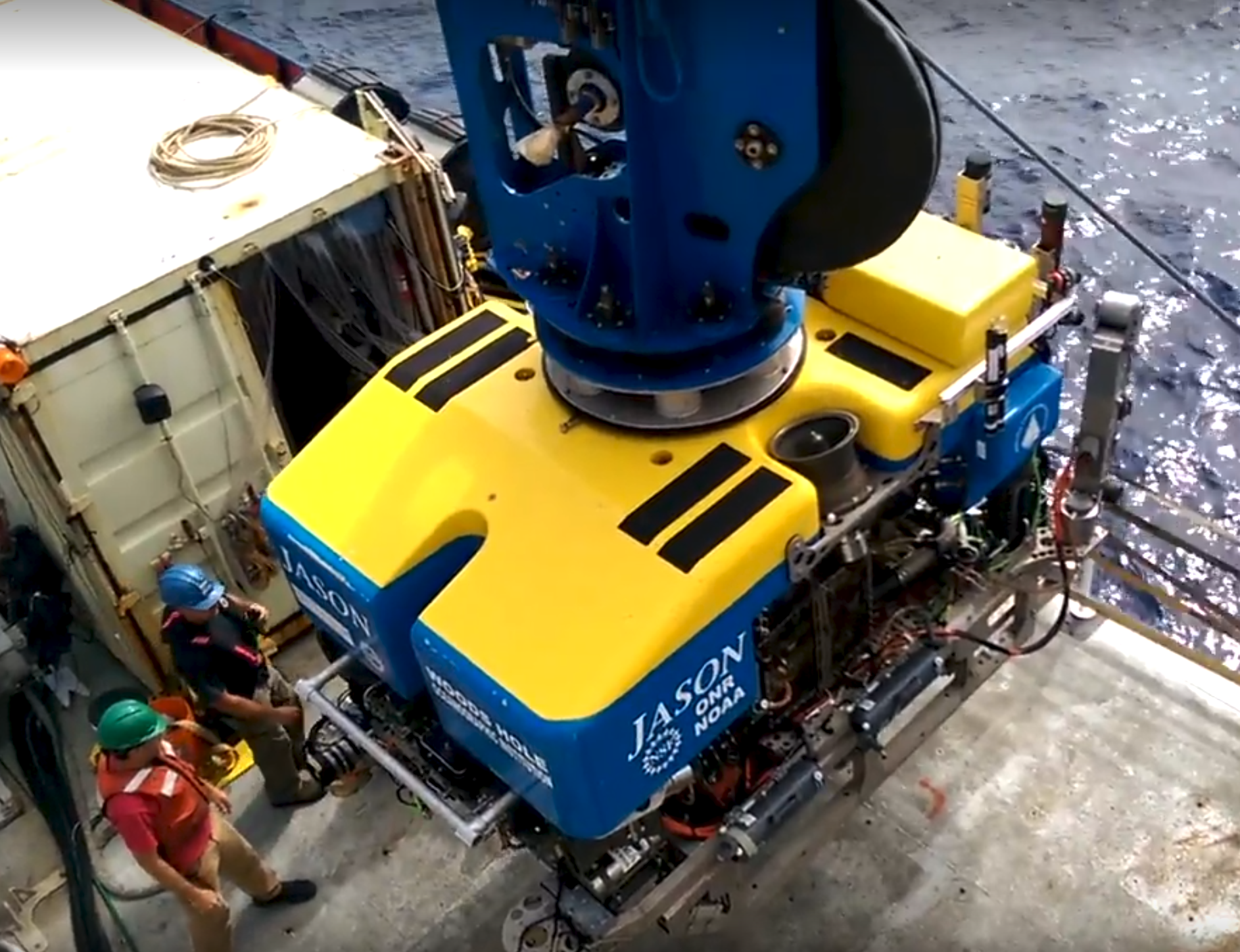

History
- Name: Jason
- Builder: WHOI

General characteristics
- Tonnage: 4.5 tons
- Length: 3.4 m (11 ft 2 in)
- Beam: 2.2 m (7 ft 3 in)
- Height: 2.4 m (7 ft 10 in)
- Propulsion: Six brushless DC thrusters each providing 250 lbf thrust
- Speed: 1.5 knot forward, 0.5 knot lateral, 1.0 knot vertical
- Endurance: theoretically indefinite
- Test depth: 6500 m

Jason is a two-body remotely operated vehicle (ROV) designed, built, and operated by the National Deep Submergence Laboratory of the Woods Hole Oceanographic Institution (WHOI). Construction of Jason began in 1982 and was first launched in 1988, redesigned in 2002 as the second iteration of the ROV (Jason II). As of 2020, Jason has completed 147 cruises with over 1200 dives and over 16,000 hours of dive time.

== Construction ==
Development on Jason/Medea began in 1982, with the goal of removing constraints of human operated vehicles such as Alvin. Alvin only had 3-4 hours of time on the seafloor, required extensive and expensive planning for safety purposes, and required a sophisticated handling system for such a large vehicle.

Jason's original commission was in 1988, with a deployment at Hood Canal in Washington state, USA. The first-generation of the ROV was involved in over 200 launches until its retirement in 2001. The second-generation ROV, called the Jason II, had its sea trials in July 2002 at Nubbin Seamount in the Cascadia basin. In 2016, Jason was upgraded with a new frame, tether, recovery system, and skids that increased the payload by several thousand pounds.

A 10-kilometer (6-mile) electro-optical-mechanical tether delivers electrical power and commands from the ship through Medea and down to Jason, which then returns data and live video imagery. Medea serves as a shock absorber, buffering Jason from the movements of the ship, while providing lighting and a bird’s eye view of the ROV during seafloor operations.

Jason, while not requiring an entire ship for operations, does require modular workshop and control vans for operations and maintenance on any vessel. In addition, the ROV requires an overboard handling system such as a crane or A-frame, winch system, and data center be installed on the vessel.

== Equipment ==
Jason is equipped with sonar imaging as well as video, still, and electronic cameras and appropriate lighting gear. It carries precision navigation equipment and sensors for depth, vehicle attitude (tilt), and altitude from the seafloor. Jason's manipulator arms can collect samples that may be put in a small basket attached to the vehicle or, for heavier items, on an attached "elevator" platform that carries them to the surface.

- Payload: 50 kg
- Attitude: Two-axis clinometer, 0.1 degree resolution
- Heading: Flux-gate compass, 0.1 degree resolution
- Gyro: Gimballed gyro, 0.1 degree resolution
- Pressure: Depth Bulk semiconductor strain gauge, 1m resolution
- Altitude: 120kHz updating at 2Hz, 33 meters range, 0.1 m resolution
- Video: Two surface-selectable channels from the following: One single-CCD-chip color; One three-CCD-chip color; One single-CCD-chip black and white, aft looking
- Still camera: 35mm, 400 frames with either 16mm or 28mm lens
- Electronic camera: Marquest Model 9100 camera
- Lighting: One 200 watt-second strobe; One 300 or 600 watt-second strobe; Three 250 watt incandescent lamps; Two 400 watt HMI lights.
- Sonar: SImagenex 855 scanning sonar with forward imaging or profiling head
- Navigation: Long base line responder or relay transmitter/receiver, 7-12kHz vehicle powered or battery operated for emergency location

== Gallery ==
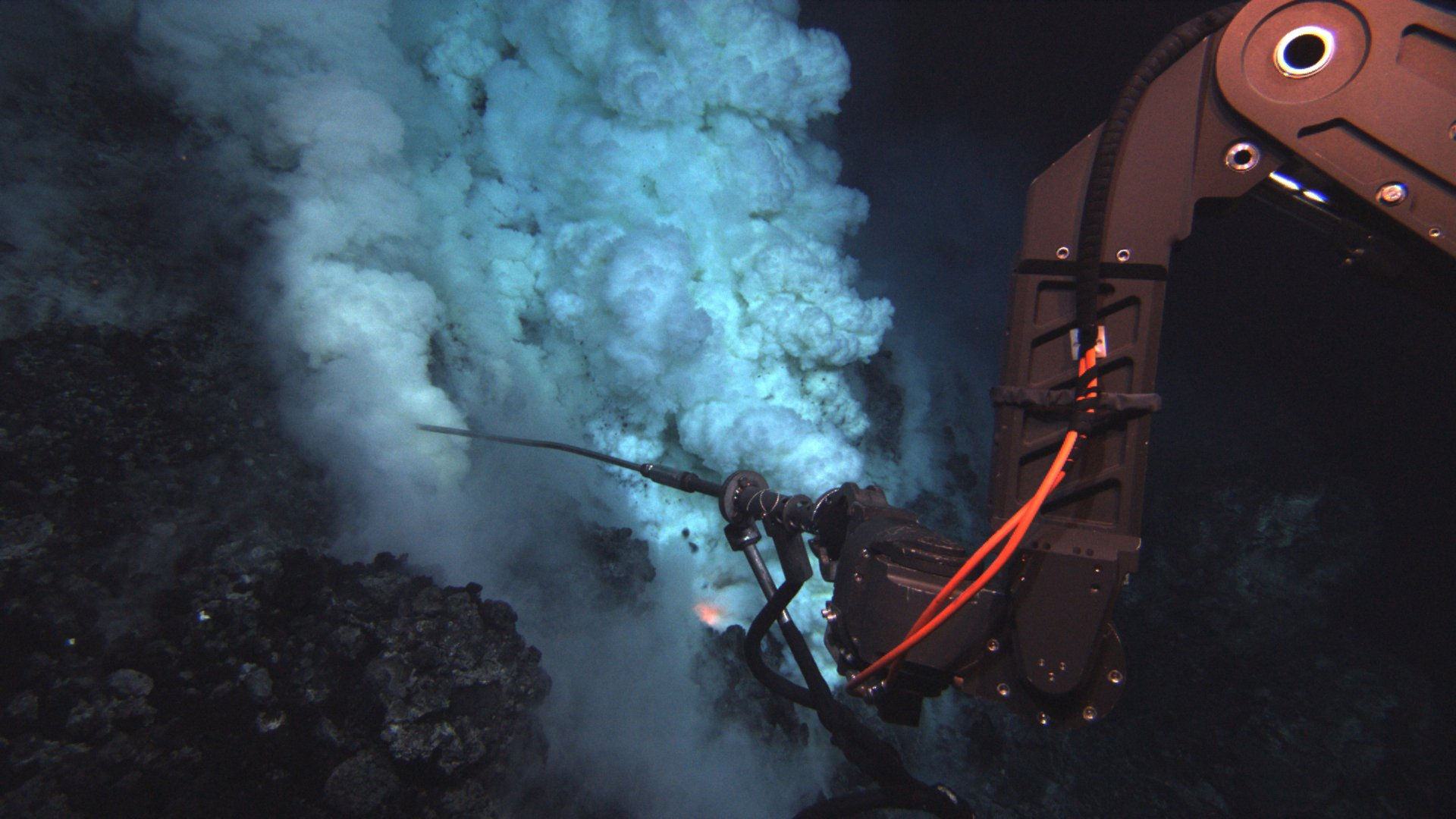
Jason arm samples fluid at the West Mata undersea volcano

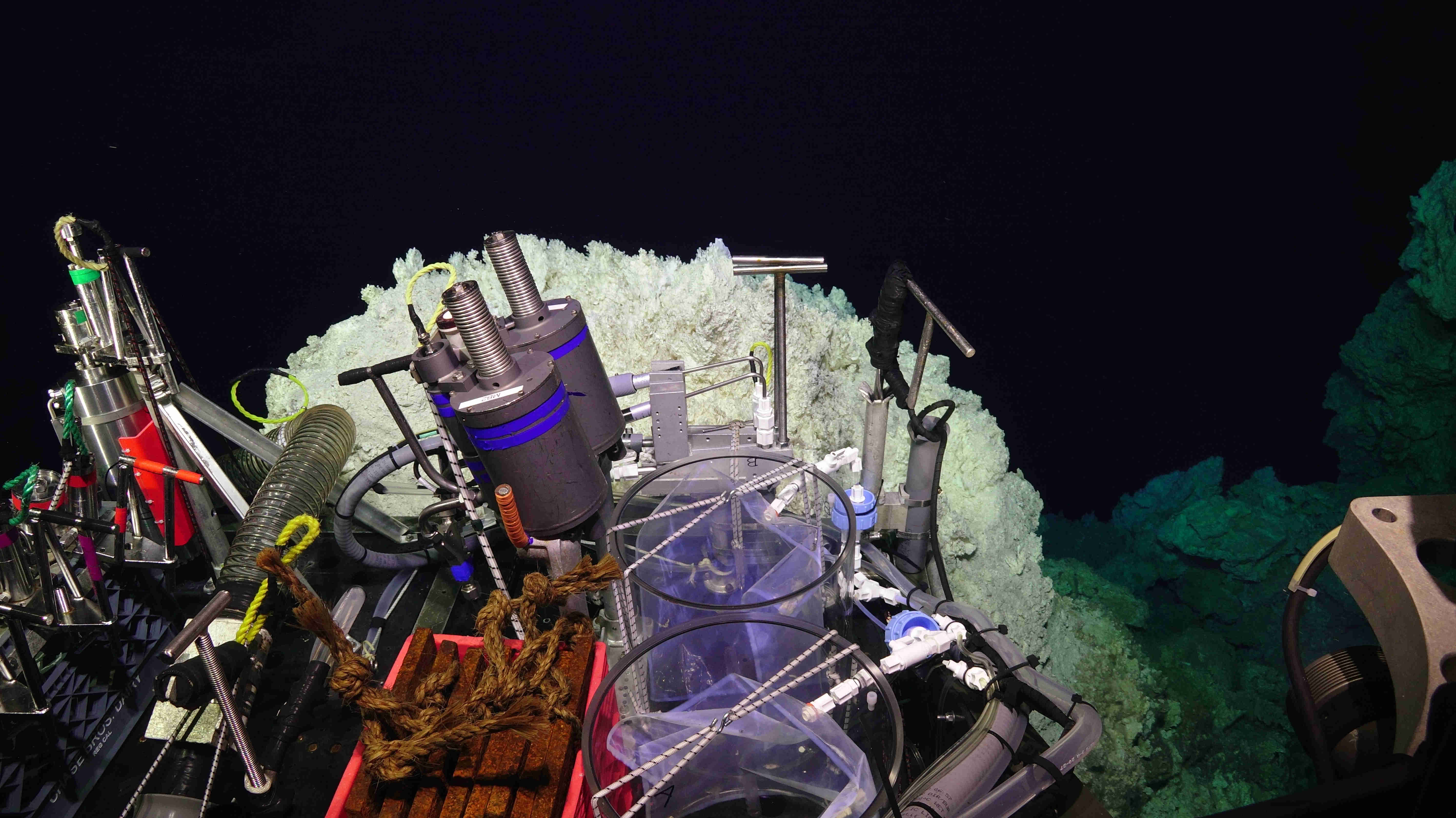
Jason's sampling basket, filled with scientific equipment

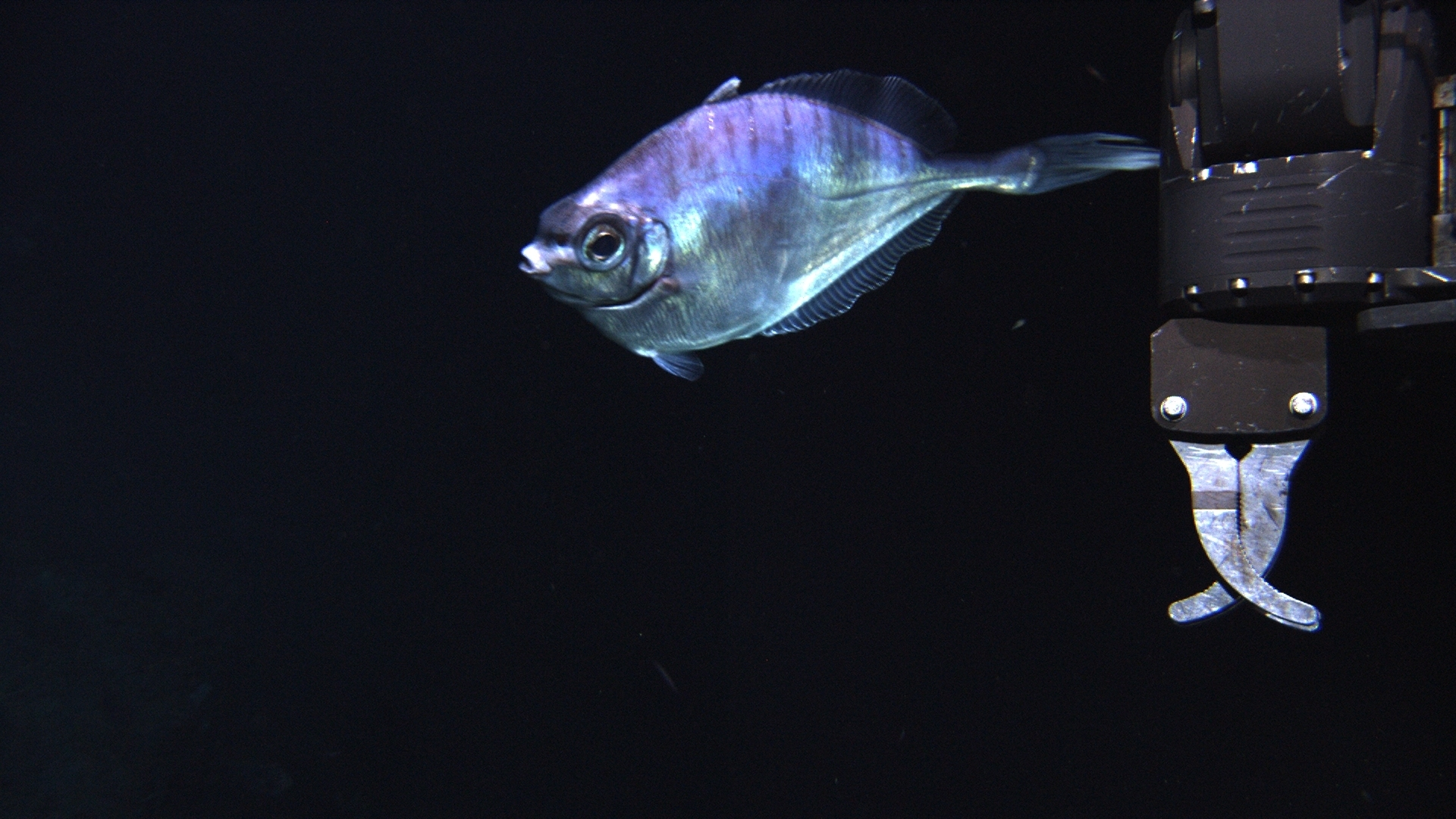
A fish swims by Jason's manipulator arm

== Trivia ==
Jason and Medea were named after the married characters of Greek mythology.

A prototype of Jason called Jason Jr. was used with Alvin to explore Titanic in 1986. Jason Jr. was lost at sea in 1991.

In late summer 2021, two other ROVs, Hercules and Argus, were lost when the ship tether broke while deployed off the coast of Vancouver Island. Jason happened to be fewer than 200 miles away, and managed to recover them within 24 hours of arriving at the other vessel.
