= Jadson (footballer, born August 1991) =

Brazilian footballer

Personal information
- Full name: Jadson de Brito Lima
- Date of birth: 22 August 1991 (age 35)
- Place of birth: Salvador, Brazil
- Height: 1.73 m (5 ft 8 in)
- Position: Midfielder

Youth career
- –2010: Corinthians

Senior career*
Years	Team	Apps	(Gls)
2009–2011	Corinthians	7	(0)
2010	→ Icasa (loan)	2	(0)
2011	→ Comercial-SP (loan)	16	(2)
2011–2012	Barretos	11	(3)
2013	Monte Azul	5	(0)
2014	Votuporanguense	8	(2)
2014	Fernandópolis	5	(1)
2014	Mirassol	0	(0)
2015	Cabofriense	1	(0)
2015–2016	Nacional-SP	7	(1)
2016	São Carlos	0	(0)
2017	Tiradentes-CE	2	(1)
2017	Nacional-SP	2	(0)
2018	Noroeste	1	(0)
2018	Social	6	(0)
2018	Novoperário	7	(0)
2018	Penapolense	0	(0)
2019	Passo Fundo	0	(0)
2019	EC São Bernardo	5	(2)
2020	Nacional-SP	2	(0)
2021	Juventus Jaraguá	2	(0)
2022	Olímpia	6	(0)
- * Club domestic league appearances and goals

Jadson de Brito Lima (born 22 August 1991), simply known as Jadson, is a Brazilian retired footballer who played as a midfielder.

== Career ==
Jadson de Brito Lima, arrived at the basic categories of Corinthians in 2006. The player participated in the successful campaign of the junior team during the Copa São Paulo de 2009. The midfielder rose to the professional team for Mano Menezes at the end of May 2009.

=== Career statistics ===
(Correct as of October 16, 2010)

Club	Season	State League		Brazilian Série A		Copa do Brasil		Copa Libertadores		Copa Sudamericana		Total	
Club	Season	Apps	Goals	Apps	Goals	Apps	Goals	Apps	Goals	Apps	Goals	Apps	Goals
Corinthians Paulista	2009	-	-	7	0	-	-	-	-	-	-	7	0
Total		-	-	7	0	-	-	-	-	-	-	7	0

== See also ==
- Football in Brazil
- List of football clubs in Brazil
