= HMS Jason =

Twelve ships of the Royal Navy have been called HMS Jason, after the Greek mythological character Jason:

- HMS Jason (1673) was a 6-gun fireship purchased in 1673 and sold in 1674.
- HMS Jason (1747) was a 44-gun fifth rate captured from the French in 1747 and sold in 1793.
- HMS Jason (1763) was a 32-gun fifth rate launched in 1763 and sold in 1785.
- HMS Jason (1782) was a 64-gun third rate captured from the French in 1782. She was renamed HMS Argonaut in 1783 and was broken up in 1831.
- HMS Jason (1794) was a 38-gun fifth rate launched in 1794 and wrecked in 1798.
- HMS Jason (1800) was a 36-gun fifth rate launched in 1800 and wrecked in 1801.
- HMS Jason (1804) was a 32-gun fifth rate launched in 1804 and broken up in 1815.
- HMS Jason (1813) was a 12-gun gun-brig, formerly a French privateer. She was captured in 1813 by HMS Venerable and was possibly later renamed.
- HMS Jason was to have been a 46-gun fifth rate. She was ordered in 1817 but was cancelled in 1831.
- HMS Jason (1859) was a wood screw corvette launched in 1859 and broken up in 1877.
- HMS Jason (1892) was an Alarm-class torpedo gunboat launched in 1892 and converted to a minesweeper in 1909. She was sunk by a naval mine on 7 April 1917.
- HMS Jason (J99) was a survey ship launched in 1937. She was converted to an anti-submarine vessel in 1939, and a minesweeper in 1942. She was sold in 1946 and renamed Jaslock, and was broken up in 1950.
