= Robert Ballard =

Retired US Navy officer and professor of oceanography (born 1942)

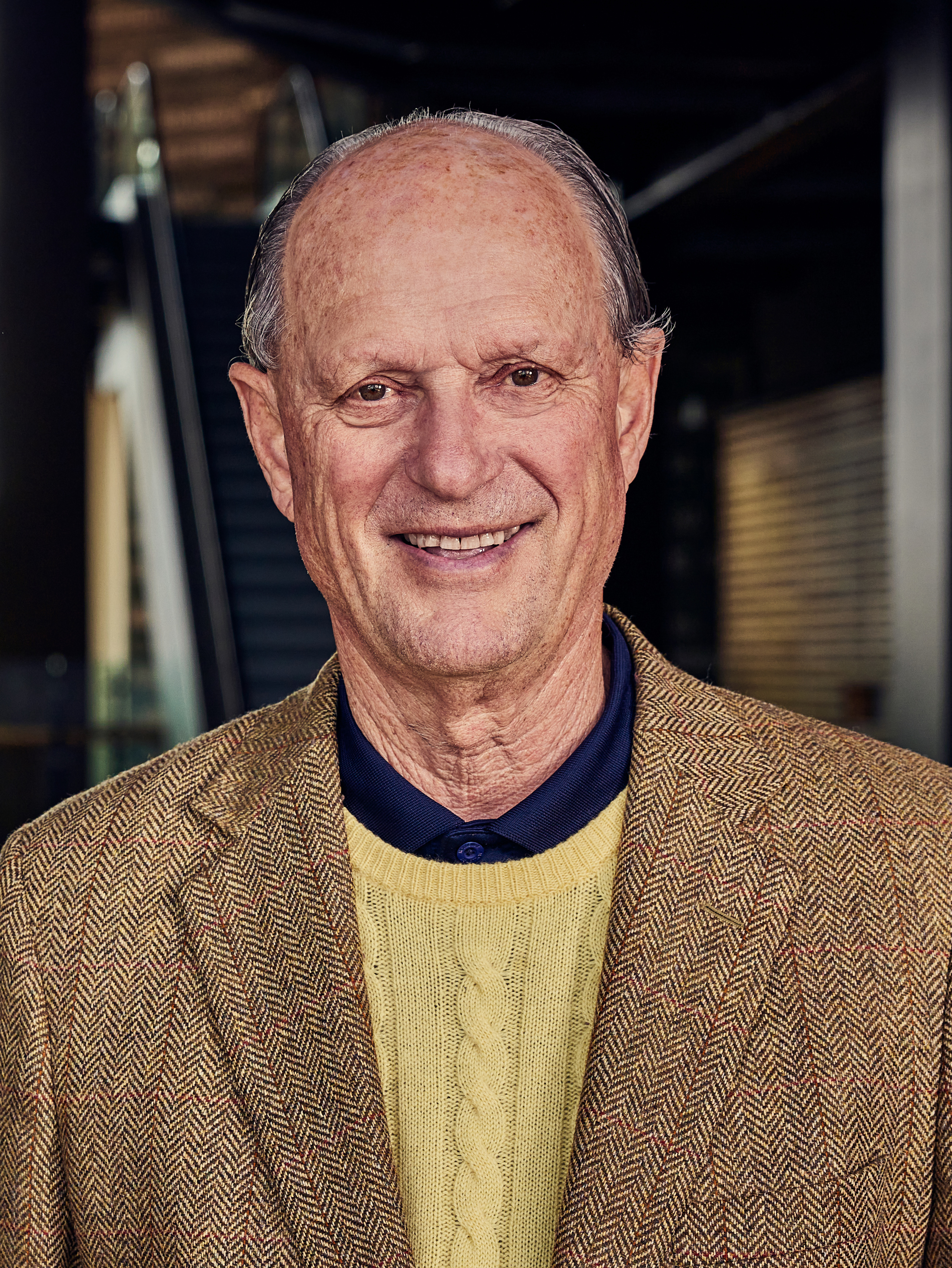
- Ballard in 2023
- Born: Robert Duane Ballard; June 30, 1942 (age 84); Wichita, Kansas, U.S.
- Education: University of California, Santa Barbara (BS); University of Hawaiʻi at Mānoa (MS); University of Rhode Island (PhD)
- Employer: University of Rhode Island (Graduate School of Oceanography)
- Known for: Ocean exploration and underwater archaeology; discovery / exploration of the wrecks of the RMS Titanic, the battleship Bismarck, the aircraft carrier USS Yorktown (CV-5), John F. Kennedy's PT-109, RMS Lusitania, USS Thresher, USS Scorpion, and ancient Roman ship Isis
- Spouses: Marjorie Jacobsen (m. 1966; div. 1990) Barbara Earle (m. 1991)
- Children: 4
- Awards: Kilby International Award (1994); The Explorers Club Medal (1995); Hubbard Medal (1996); James H. Shea Award (2000); Caird Medal (2002); National Humanities Medal (2003)
- Military career
- Allegiance: United States
- Branch: United States Army; United States Navy
- Service years: 1965–1995
- Rank: Commander

Robert Duane Ballard (born June 30, 1942) is an American retired Navy officer and a professor of oceanography at the University of Rhode Island who is noted for his work in underwater archaeology (maritime archaeology and archaeology of shipwrecks) and marine geology. He is best known by the general public for the discoveries of the wrecks of the RMS Titanic in 1985, the battleship Bismarck in 1989, and the aircraft carrier USS Yorktown in 1998. He discovered the wreck of John F. Kennedy's PT-109 in 2002 and visited Biuku Gasa and Eroni Kumana, who saved its crew.

Ballard discovered hydrothermal vents, undersea volcanic features that emit plumes of hot, nutrient-laden water which support the only ecosystems on Earth entirely independent of the Sun. He was quoted as saying that "finding hydrothermal vents beats the hell out of finding the Titanic". His mother later agreed, commenting "It's too bad you found that rusty old boat... they're only going to remember you for finding [it]". Ballard also established the JASON Project, and leads ocean exploration on the research vessel E/V Nautilus.

== Early life and education ==
Robert Duane Ballard was born in Wichita, Kansas. He had an older brother and a younger sister. When Ballard was two years old, his family moved to southern California, where his father worked as a flight test engineer. He has attributed his early interest in underwater exploration to watching the 1954 film 20,000 Leagues Under the Sea, an adaptation of Jules Verne's 1870 novel. While he was a high school student, his father connected him with oceanographers at Scripps Institution of Oceanography, and he participated in several short research expeditions. Ballard enrolled at University of California, Santa Barbara, and joined the Army Reserve Officer Training Corps.

Beginning in 1962, Ballard worked part-time with Andreas Rechnitzer's Ocean Systems Group at North American Aviation, where his father was the chief engineer of North American's Minuteman missile program. At North American, Ballard worked on its failed proposal to build the submersible Alvin for the Woods Hole Oceanographic Institution.

In 1965, Ballard graduated from the University of California, Santa Barbara, earning undergraduate degrees in chemistry and geology. While a student in Santa Barbara, California, he joined Sigma Alpha Epsilon fraternity, and also completed the US Army's ROTC program, giving him an Army officer's commission in Army Intelligence. His first graduate degree (MS, 1966) was in geophysics from the University of Hawaiʻi's Institute of Geophysics where he trained porpoises and whales. Subsequently, he returned to Andreas Rechnitzer's Ocean Systems Group at North American Aviation.

Ballard was working towards a PhD in marine geology at the University of Southern California in 1967 when he was called to active duty. Upon his request, he was transferred from the Army into the US Navy as an oceanographer. The Navy assigned him as a liaison between the Office of Naval Research and the Woods Hole Oceanographic Institution in Woods Hole, Massachusetts.

After leaving active duty and entering the Naval Reserve in 1970, Ballard continued working at Woods Hole persuading organizations and people, mostly scientists, to fund and use Alvin for undersea research. Four years later he received a PhD in marine geology and geophysics at the University of Rhode Island.

== Military career ==
Ballard joined the United States Army Reserve in 1965 through the Reserve Officers Training program. He was commissioned as a second lieutenant and assigned to army intelligence. When called to active duty in 1967, he asked to fulfill his obligation in the United States Navy. His request was approved, and he was transferred to the Navy Reserve. After completing his active-duty obligation in 1970, he was returned to reserve status, where he remained for much of his military career, being called up only for mandatory training and special assignments. He retired from the Navy as a commander in 1995 after reaching the statutory service limit.

== Marine geology ==
Ballard's first dive in a submersible was in the Ben Franklin (PX-15) in 1969 off the coast of Florida during a Woods Hole Oceanographic Institution expedition. In the summer of 1970, he began a field mapping project of the Gulf of Maine for his doctoral dissertation. It used an air gun that sent sound waves underwater to determine the underlying structure of the ocean floor and the submersible Alvin, which was used to find and recover a sample from the bedrock.

Ballard was geologist diver in Alvin during Project FAMOUS, which explored the median rift valley of the Mid-Atlantic Ridge in 1974.

During the summer of 1975, Ballard participated in a joint French-American expedition called Phere searching for hydrothermal vents over the Mid-Atlantic Ridge, but the expedition did not find any active vents.

On the Galapagos spreading center east of the islands a 1977 exploration by Alvin found deep-sea hydrothermal vents surrounded by communities of living organisms with energy derived by chemosynthesis. Ballard was a participating diver. While the discovery was of immense biological significance, the expedition's scientists were all geologists, with no biologists, as it was thought certain there would be no life to study, let alone forms unknown to science.

The 1979 RISE project expedition on the East Pacific Rise west of Mexico at 21°N was aided by deep-towed still camera sleds that were able to take pictures of the ocean floor, making it easier to find hydrothermal vent locations. When Alvin inspected one of the sites the deep tow located, the scientists observed black "smoke" billowing out of the vents, something not observed at the Galápagos Rift.

Ballard and geophysicist Jean Francheteau went down in Alvin the day after the black smokers were first observed. They were able to take an accurate temperature reading of the active vent (the previous dive's thermometer had melted) and recorded a temperature of 350 °C (623 K; 662 °F).

They continued searching for more vents along the East Pacific Rise between 1980 and 1982.

== Marine archaeology ==
While Ballard had been interested in the sea since an early age, his work at Woods Hole and his scuba diving experiences off Massachusetts spurred his interest in shipwrecks and their exploration. His work in the Navy involved developing small, unmanned submersibles that could be tethered to and controlled from a surface ship and were outfitted with lighting, cameras, and manipulator arms. As early as 1973, he saw this as a way of searching for the wreck of the Titanic. In 1977, he led his first expedition, which was unsuccessful.

=== RMS Titanic ===
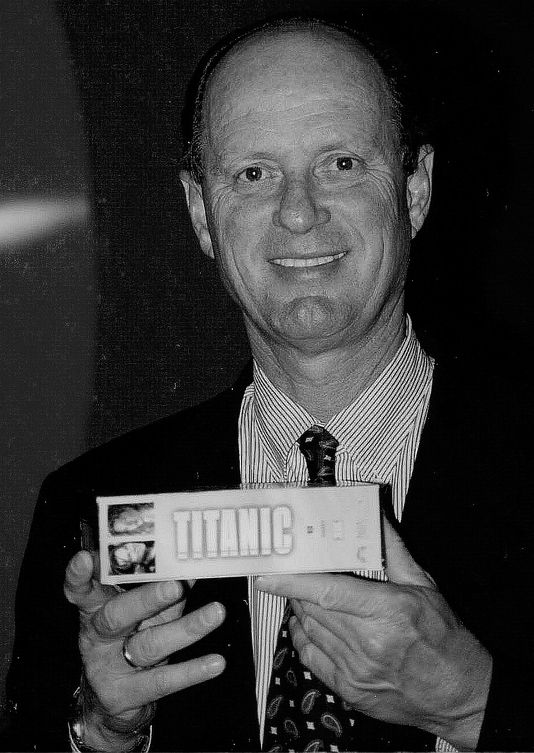
Ballard in 1999 with a VHS copy of the film Titanic

In the summer of 1985, Ballard was aboard the French research ship Le Suroît, which was using the side scan sonar SAR to search for the Titanic's wreck. When the French ship was recalled, he transferred onto a ship from Woods Hole, the R/V Knorr. Unbeknownst to some, this trip was financed by the U.S. Navy for secret reconnaissance of the wreckage of two Navy nuclear powered attack submarines, the USS Scorpion and the USS Thresher, which sank in the 1960s, and not for the Titanic. In 1982, Ballard had approached the Navy about his new deep sea underwater robot craft, the Argo, and his search for the Titanic. The Navy, while not interested in funding Ballard's Titanic search on its own, ultimately concluded that Argo was their best chance to locate their missing submarines, and agreed to finance his expedition on the condition that he first investigated the two submarines, assessed the state of their nuclear reactors, and determined if their long submergence had caused any radioactive environmental impact. He was placed on temporary active duty in the Navy, in charge of finding and investigating the wrecks, after which he would be free to use any remaining time and resources to hunt for the Titanic.

After their missions for the Navy, Knorr arrived on site on August 22, 1985, and deployed Argo. When they searched for the two submarines, Ballard and his team discovered they had imploded from the immense pressure at depth. It littered thousands of pieces of debris all over the ocean floor. Following the large trail of debris led them directly to the remnants of both vessels and made them significantly easier to locate than if they were to search for the hulls directly. He already knew that the Titanic imploded from pressure, much like the two submarines, and concluded that it too must have left a scattered debris trail. Using that lesson, they had Argo sweep back and forth across the ocean floor looking for the Titanic's debris trail. They took shifts monitoring the video feed from Argo as it searched the ocean floor two miles below.

In the early morning of September 1, 1985, observers noted anomalies on the smooth ocean floor. At first, it was pockmarks, like small craters from impacts. Eventually, debris was sighted as the rest of the team was awakened. Finally, a boiler was sighted, and soon after that, the hull was found.

Ballard's team made a general search of the Titanic's exterior, noting its condition. Most significantly, they confirmed that it had split in two and that the stern was in far worse shape than the bow. They did not have much time to explore, as others were waiting to take Knorr on other scientific pursuits, but his fame was now assured. He originally planned to keep the location secret to prevent anyone from claiming prizes. He considered the site a cemetery and refused to desecrate it by removing artifacts.

On July 12, 1986, Ballard and his team returned on board Atlantis II to make the first detailed study of the wreck. This time, he brought Alvin. It was accompanied by Jason Junior, a small remotely operated vehicle that could fit through small openings to see into the ship's interior. Although the first dive (taking over two hours) encountered technical problems, subsequent ones were far more successful and produced a detailed photographic record of the wreck's condition.

In 1988, Ballard published a book, Discovery Of The Titanic: Exploring The Greatest Of All Lost Ships, ISBN 0-446-51385-7 and he later recounted the specifics of the expedition for a National Geographic video documentary released in 1987.

Many of the relics retrieved by various groups, not including Ballard, from RMS Titanic were owned by Premier Exhibitions which filed for bankruptcy in 2016. In late August 2018, the groups vying for ownership of the 5,500 relics included one by museums in England and Northern Ireland with assistance from filmmaker James Cameron and some financial support from National Geographic. Ballard told the news media that he favored this bid since it would ensure that the memorabilia would be permanently displayed in Belfast and in Greenwich. A decision as to the outcome was to be made by a United States district court judge.

=== Other wrecks ===
==== USS Thresher and USS Scorpion ====
In 1985, the U.S. Navy secretly lent Ballard the Alvin submersible to visit the wreck sites of the USS Thresher and USS Scorpion and to take the last photos taken of the wrecks. In exchange for his work regarding the wrecks, the U.S. Navy then allowed Ballard, a USNR officer, to use the same submersible to search for RMS Titanic, with the search for the latter being the cover story to avoid alerting the Russians to the effort to find and examine the missing submarines.

==== Bismarck ====
Ballard undertook an even more daunting task when he and his team searched off the coast of France for the German Battleship Bismarck in 1989, using an ocean-crawling robot. The 15,000 foot deep water in which it sank is 4,000 feet deeper than that where the Titanic sank. He attempted to determine whether it had been sunk by the British or was scuttled by its crew. Three weeks after the expedition however, personal tragedy struck him when his 21-year-old son, Todd, who had aided him in the search, was killed in a car accident.

Ballard later published a book about the quest, The Discovery of the Bismarck (1990) The discovery was also documented for National Geographic in a 1989 James Cameron video Search for the Battleship Bismarck which indicated that the ship had been damaged by torpedoes and shells from British ships. The actual cause of the sinking, however, was sabotage of the underwater valves by the onboard crew, according to Ballard, who said, "we found a hull that appears whole and relatively undamaged by the descent and impact". Filmmaker Cameron, however, said that his crew's examination of the wreckage indicated that the Bismarck would have sunk eventually even if it had not been scuttled.

==== Isis ====
In 1989, Ballard discovered the wreck of the ancient Roman ship Isis off the coast of Sicily.

==== Battle of Guadalcanal ====
In 1992, Ballard and his team visited the sites of many wrecks of World War II in the Pacific. Doing so, he discovered the wreck of the IJN Kirishima. His book Lost Ships of Guadalcanal locates and photographs many of the vessels sunk at Ironbottom Sound, the strait between Guadalcanal Island and the Floridas in the Solomon Islands.

==== Lusitania ====
In 1993, Ballard investigated the wreck of RMS Lusitania off the Irish coast. It had been struck by a torpedo, whose explosion was followed by a second, much larger one. The wreck had been depth charged by the Royal Navy several years after the sinking and had also been damaged by other explorers, making a forensic analysis difficult. He found no evidence of boiler explosion and he speculated the ignition of coal dust inside the ship caused a "massive, uncontrollable [second] explosion".

Others have questioned this hypothesis, some suggesting that the ship had been sabotaged by the British. Ballard found no evidence to support this claim. Some experts have indicated that it was, in fact, boiler explosions that caused the ship to sink so quickly, in a mere 18 minutes.

Ballard published a book about the discovery, Exploring the Lusitania: Probing the Mysteries of the Sinking that Changed History, also titled Robert Ballard's Lusitania in some markets, with co-author Spencer Dunmore.

==== USS Yorktown ====
On May 19, 1998, Ballard found the wreck of Yorktown, sunk at the Battle of Midway. Found three miles (5 km) beneath the surface, it was photographed.

==== PT-109 ====
In 2002, the National Geographic Society and Ballard fielded a ship with remote vehicles to the Solomon Islands. They succeeded in finding a torpedo tube and the forward section from the shipwreck of John F. Kennedy's PT-109 which was rammed in 1943 by the Japanese destroyer Amagiri off Ghizo Island. The visit also brought to light the identity of islanders Biuku Gasa and Eroni Kumana who had received little recognition for finding the shipwrecked crew after searching for days in their dugout canoe. A TV special and a book were produced, and Ballard spoke at the John F. Kennedy Library in 2005.

=== Institute for Exploration ===
In the 1990s Ballard founded the Institute for Exploration, which specializes in deep-sea archaeology and geology. It joined forces in 1999 with the Mystic Aquarium in Mystic, Connecticut. They are a part of the non-profit Sea Research Foundation, Inc.

=== Center for Ocean Exploration and Archaeological Oceanography ===
In 2003, Ballard started the Center for Ocean Exploration and Archaeological Oceanography, a research program at the University of Rhode Island's Graduate School of Oceanography.

=== Black Sea ===
In 1976, Willard Bascom suggested that the deep, anoxic waters of the Black Sea might have preserved ships from antiquity because typical wood-devouring organisms could not survive there. At a depth of 150 m, it contains insufficient oxygen to support most familiar biological life forms.

Originally a land-locked freshwater lake, the Black Sea was flooded with salt water from the Mediterranean Sea during the Holocene. The influx of salt water essentially smothered the freshwater below it because a lack of internal motion and mixing meant that no fresh oxygen reached the deep waters, creating a meromictic body of water. The anoxic environment, which is hostile to many biological organisms that destroy wood in the oxygenated waters, provides an excellent testing site for deep-water archaeological surveys.

In a series of expeditions, a team of marine archaeologists led by Ballard identified what appeared to be ancient shorelines, freshwater snail shells, and drowned river valleys in roughly 300 feet (100 m) of water off the Black Sea coast of modern Turkey. Radiocarbon dating of freshwater mollusk remains indicated an age of about 7,000 years.

The team discovered three ancient wrecks west of the town of Sinop at depths of 100 m. Wreck A and Wreck C probably date to the late Roman period (2nd–4th century A.D.), while Wreck B probably dates to the Byzantine period (5th to 7th century A.D.).

To the east of Sinop, the team discovered a remarkably well-preserved wreck at a 320 m depth, in the Black Sea's deep anoxic waters. The vessel's entire hull and cargo are intact, buried in sediments. Its deck structures are also intact, including a mast rising 11 m into the water column. Radiocarbon dating of wood from the wreck provides a date of 410–520 A.D. It has been named "Sinop D" by the Ballard team.

In 2000, the team conducted an expedition that focused on exploration of the seabed about 15–30 km west of Sinop, and an additional deep-water survey east and north of the peninsula. Their project had several goals. They sought to discover whether human habitation sites could be identified on the ancient submerged landscape, they examined the sea-bed for shipwrecks (where they found Sinop A-D), to test the hypothesis that the anoxic waters below 200 m would protect shipwrecks from the expected biological attacks on organic components, and to seek data about an ancient trade route between Sinop and the Crimea indicated by terrestrial archaeological remains.

Although Sinop served as a primary trade center in the Black Sea, the wrecks were located west of the trade route predicted by the prevalence of Sinopian ceramics on the Crimean peninsula. On wrecks A-C, mounds of distinctive carrot-shaped shipping jars, called amphorae, were found. They were of a style associated with Sinop and retained much of their original stacking pattern on the sea floor. The jars may have carried a variety of archetypal Black Sea products such as olive oil, honey, wine, or fish sauce. The contents are unknown because no artifacts were recovered from these wreck sites in 2000.

The wreck provided the team with vast information about the technological changes and trade in the Black Sea during political, social, and economic transition through their study of the ship's construction techniques. Studies show that in Sinop during the Byzantine era, they had developed long-distance trading as early as 4500 BC. Sea-trading on the Black Sea was most intense during the period of late antiquity, between the 2nd and 7th centuries AD. The examination of the four shipwrecks found by Ballard and his team provide the direct evidence for Black Sea maritime trade so well attested by the distribution of ceramics on land.

The video images of Shipwreck A show a wall of shipping jars standing about 2 m above the seabed. The amphorae highest on the mound had fallen over without displacing those still standing in the rows beneath them, and, likely, the ship settled upright on the seabed gradually being both buried in and filled with sediment as exposed wood was devoured by the larva or the shipworm.

Shipwreck B also consisted of a large pile of amphorae but several types are visible, as are multiple timbers protruding from within the mound and on it. In addition to the Sinop-style jars, several amphorae similar to examples excavated on the Yassiada Byzantine shipwreck and dating from the 5th to late 6th century AD are present.

Two discrete and mostly buried piles of carrot-shaped shipping jars comprise shipwreck C. The team's visit to the site was short and was intended primarily to test survey methodology for deep-water procedures.

Shipwreck D provided the team with an unprecedented opportunity to document hull construction during a time of transition. When observing the sonar signature of Shipwreck D, a long, slender upright feature on the seabed, transformed itself into a wooden mast. Elements rarely present on shallower shipwreck sites are beautifully preserved 200 m below the surface. Disappointingly for ship scholars and historians of technology, there are few indications of how the planks of Sinop D are held together. There are no mortise and tenon fastenings and no sewing. Shipwreck D may be one of the earliest lateen-rigged ships to be studied by archaeologists. The angle of the mast and the lack of fittings on it suggest that a lateen sail is the most likely configuration for such a small vessel.

The Institute for Exploration Black Sea expeditions relied on remote sensing with side-scan sonar in shallow and deep water to identify potential archaeological sites examined by ROVs. The hypothesis that the anoxic waters of the Black Sea would allow extraordinary organic preservation is borne out by the discovery of Sinop D, the 1,500-year-old shipwreck with excellent preservation of features above the sediment layer.

According to a report in New Scientist magazine (May 4, 2002, p. 13), the researchers found an underwater delta south of the Bosporus. There was evidence of a strong flow of fresh water out of the Black Sea in the 8th millennium BC. Ballard's research has contributed to the debate over the Black Sea deluge theory.

== Awards and honors ==
- In 1988, he was awarded an honorary degree (Doctor of Science) by the University of Bath.
- In 1990, he received the American Academy of Achievement's Golden Plate Award.
- Kilby International Award recipient in 1994
- In 1995, he was awarded with the Explorers Club Medal of The Explorers Club
- In 1996 the U.S. Navy Memorial Foundation awarded Ballard its Lone Sailor Award for his naval service and his work on underwater archaeology.
- In 2000 he was awarded the James H. Shea Award.
- The Caird Medal of the National Maritime Museum in 2002
- Asteroid 11277 Ballard, discovered by Carolyn and Eugene Shoemaker at Palomar Observatory, was named in his honor in 2002.
- The National Humanities Medal for 2003.

== Other works ==
=== Academics ===
In 2004, Ballard was appointed professor of oceanography, and currently serves as Director of the Institute for Archaeological Oceanography, at the University of Rhode Island's Graduate School of Oceanography. He was the first speaker to give the Charles and Marie Fish Lecture in Oceanography at the University of Rhode Island in 2002.

=== Television ===
Ballard served as the technical consultant on the science fiction series seaQuest DSV during its first season from September 1993 until May 1994. During the closing credits, he would speak about the scientific elements present in any given episode and place them in a contemporary context. Although he exited the series in the second season, he was referenced in the third season, with the "Ballard Institute" being named after him.

=== Education ===
In 1989, Ballard founded the JASON Project, a distance education program designed to excite and engage middle school students in science and technology. He began the JASON Project in response to the thousands of letters he received from students following his discovery of the wreck of the Titanic.

== Personal life ==
Ballard married Marjorie Jacobsen in 1966 and divorced in 1990. He remarried in 1991 to Barbara Earle. Ballard has three sons and one daughter.

== See also ==
- Center for Ocean Exploration and Archaeological Oceanography
- German battleship Bismarck – German battleship of World War II
- JASON Project – American science education organization
- Mystic Aquarium – Aquarium in Mystic, Connecticut, US
- USS Yorktown – Yorktown-class aircraft carrier of the U.S. Navy
- Wreck of the RMS Titanic – Shipwreck in the North Atlantic Ocean
