= National Oceanographic Partnership Program =

American organization

- Abbreviation: NOPP
- Formation: 1997
- Headquarters: Arlington, Virginia
- Website: nopp.org

The National Oceanographic Partnership Program (NOPP) facilitates interagency and multi-sectoral partnerships to address federal ocean science and technology research priorities. Through this collaboration, federal agencies can leverage resources to invest in priorities that fall between agency missions or are too large for any single agency to support. In its first 20 years, NOPP invested more than $468 million to support over 200 research and education projects with over 600 partners. A comparable amount of in-kind support has been committed by the research and education community.

== Purpose and function ==
NOPP was established in 1997 through the National Oceanographic Partnership Act (PL 104-201, 10 USC 7901-7903) to improve the nation’s knowledge of the ocean, with the goals of promoting national security, advancing economic development, protecting quality of life, and strengthening science education and communication.

NOPP policies are determined by the NOPP Committee, which is composed of Federal agency representatives committed to advancing ocean science and technology initiatives through partnerships. The NOPP Committee establishes NOPP implementation procedures and selects NOPP projects through agency-issued calls for proposals. The Biodiversity Ad-Hoc Working Group and Federal Renewable Ocean Energy Working Group (FROEWG) are subcommittees of the NOPP Committee focused on facilitating interagency communications and collaborations around their respective focus areas.

NOPP also supports the Interagency Working Group on Facilities and Infrastructure (IWG-FI) and the Ocean Research Advisory Panel (ORAP). IWG-FI is a subgroup of the National Science and Technology Council’s Subcommittee on Ocean and Science Technology. IWG-FI reviews and evaluates Federal infrastructure regarding facilities (e.g., ships) necessary for conducting ocean research and observation, and is involved in evaluating future needs and planning future investments in ocean-related facilities. ORAP provides independent recommendations to federal agencies that relate to the ocean and is composed of representatives from the National Academies, state governments, academic institutions, and ocean industries.

== Accomplishments ==
NOPP has significantly impacted the realm of ocean science and technology and results from NOPP research projects have informed both federal ocean policy and federal and regional natural resource management. Through its outreach efforts and support of the National Ocean Sciences Bowl, NOPP has inspired careers in STEM fields.

NOPP contributions have increased the volume and efficiency of ocean research and stimulated the development of applied ocean technology. Perhaps the most important role of NOPP has been to increase multi-disciplinary, cross-sector research partnering and strengthen communication about the most pressing research needs within the national ocean science community.

In general, NOPP projects fall within the categories of ocean observation systems, marine infrastructure and technology, earth systems modelling, coastal and marine resources, ocean education, and marine life. Projects that exemplify the highest level of success in achieving NOPP goals and working in diverse sector partnerships are awarded the yearly NOPP Excellence in Partnering Award. Some examples of NOPP-funded projects include:

- U.S. Integrated Ocean Observing System (IOOS): Over 50 NOPP projects have supported IOOS, including developing independent observation systems in every marine region of the U.S. and integrating and maintaining the necessary data infrastructure.
- Argo: The Argo program created a global array of over 3,000 autonomous profiling CTD floats that deliver real-time climate and oceanography data.
- Marine Biodiversity Observation Network (MBON): MBON has used novel eDNA techniques and ongoing ocean observation systems to evaluate habitat and trophic level diversity and changing ecological states, with the goal of better understanding the relationships between human dimensions, climate and environmental variability, and ecosystem structure.
- JASON: The JASON project began as a way to connect students and teachers to researchers participating in the 1998 East Pacific Rise expedition. In continuation, the project provides an educational platform to help educators gain access to marine researchers and interactive marine science-related curriculum.
- National Ocean Sciences Bowl (NOSB): NOSB is an academic competition that engages high school students in ocean science, prepares them for STEM careers, and helps them become environmental stewards.
- Marine Arctic Ecosystem Study (MARES): MARES aims to better understand the relationship between the physical, biological, chemical, and human systems of the Beaufort Sea, with the goal of advancing prediction capabilities relating to marine life, human use, sea ice, and atmospheric and oceanic processes.
- Deep Sea Exploration to Advance Research on Coral/Canyon/Cold Seep Habitats (Deep SEARCH): Deep SEARCH is exploring and characterizing the biological communities of deep-sea habitats to improve prediction capabilities of seafloor communities in the Atlantic that are potentially sensitive to natural and anthropogenic disturbances.
- Atlantic Deepwater Ecosystem Observatory Network (ADEON): ADEOM combines passive and active acoustic information with data from space-based remote sensing, hydrographic sensors, and mobile platforms to better understand how human, biotic, and abiotic components influence the soundscape and ecosystem of the Outer Continental Shelf.
- Bridge: The Bridge is a web-based research center that connects marine educators, academia, private sector, and government by allowing researchers to disseminate accurate and useful marine science information directly to educators.

== Partner agencies ==
- Marine Mammal Commission
- National Aeronautics and Space Administration
- National Science Foundation
- United States Department of Commerce
  - National Oceanic and Atmospheric Administration
- United States Department of Defense
  - United States Army Corps of Engineers
  - United States Coast Guard
  - Office of Naval Research
- United States Department of Energy
- United States Department of Interior
  - United States Geological Survey
  - Bureau of Ocean Energy Management
  - United States Fish and Wildlife Service
  - Bureau of Safety and Environmental Enforcement
- United States Department of State
- United States Environmental Protection Agency

== See also ==
- U.S. Global Change Research Program
- Joint Ocean Commission Initiative
