= Eugene Merle Shoemaker =

American geologist and astronomer (1928–1997)

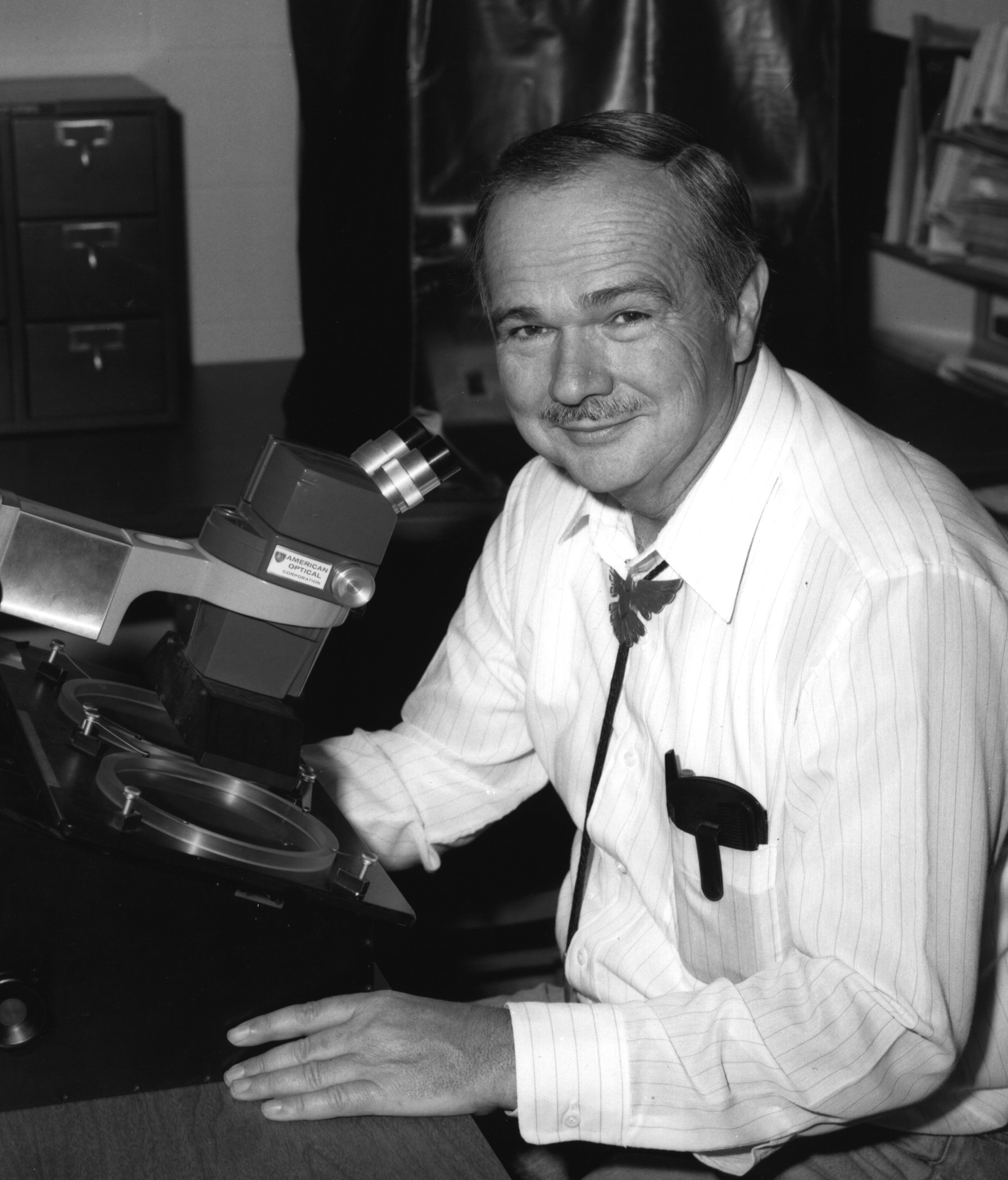
- Born: April 28, 1928; Los Angeles, California, US
- Died: July 18, 1997 (aged 69) near Alice Springs, Australia
- Education: California Institute of Technology; Princeton University
- Known for: Planetary science Comet Shoemaker–Levy 9
- Spouse: Carolyn Spellmann (m. 1951)
- Awards: G. K. Gilbert Award (1983); Barringer Medal (1984); National Medal of Science (1992); William Bowie Medal (1996); James Craig Watson Medal (1998)
- Scientific career
- Fields: Planetary geology
- Workplaces: U.S. Geological Survey, California Institute of Technology
- Thesis: Impact mechanics at Meteor Crater, Arizona. (1960)
- Doctoral advisor: Harry Hammond Hess
- Doctoral students: Larry Soderblom

Eugene Merle Shoemaker (April 28, 1928 – July 18, 1997) was an American geologist. He co-discovered Comet Shoemaker–Levy 9 with his wife Carolyn S. Shoemaker and David H. Levy. This comet hit Jupiter in July 1994: the impact was televised around the world. Shoemaker also studied terrestrial craters, such as Barringer Meteor Crater in Arizona, and along with Edward Chao provided the first conclusive evidence of its origin as an impact crater. He was also the first director of the United States Geological Survey's Astrogeology Research Program.

He was killed in a car accident while visiting an impact crater site in Australia. After his death, some of his ashes were carried to the Moon with the Lunar Prospector mission.

== Early life and formal education ==
Shoemaker was born in Los Angeles, California, the son of Muriel May (née Scott), a teacher; and George Estel Shoemaker, who worked in farming, business, teaching, and motion pictures. His parents were natives of Nebraska. During Gene's childhood they moved between Los Angeles, New York City, Buffalo, New York and Wyoming, as George worked on a variety of jobs. George hated living in big cities, and was quite satisfied to take a job as director of education for a Civilian Conservation Corps (CCC) camp in Wyoming. His wife soon found life in a remote cabin quite unsatisfactory. They compromised, when Muriel got a teaching job in Buffalo. She could teach in the Buffalo School of Practice of the State Teachers College at Buffalo during the school year while keeping Gene with her, then both would return to Wyoming during the summers. Gene's passion for studying rocks was ignited by the science education courses offered by the Buffalo Museum of Education. (Note: Buffalo Museum of Education likely refers to the institution now known as the Buffalo Museum of Science.) He enrolled in the School of Practice in the fourth grade, and began collecting samples of minerals. Within a year, he was also taking high-school-level evening courses. The family moved back to Los Angeles in 1942, where Gene enrolled in Fairfax High School at the age of thirteen. He completed high school in three years. During that time he also played violin in the school orchestra, excelled in gymnastics, and got a summer job as an apprentice lapidary.

Shoemaker enrolled in the Caltech in 1944, at the age of sixteen. (Note: Astronomer and co-discoverer of the Shoemaker-Levy comet, David H. Levy said that Shoemaker had never considered going to any other university than Caltech.) His classmates were older, more mature and on a fast track to graduate before serving in World War II. Shoemaker thrived in the fast pace and earned his bachelor's degree in 1948, at age nineteen. He immediately undertook the study of Precambrian metamorphic rocks in northern New Mexico, earning his M.Sc. degree from Caltech in 1949.

== Family ==
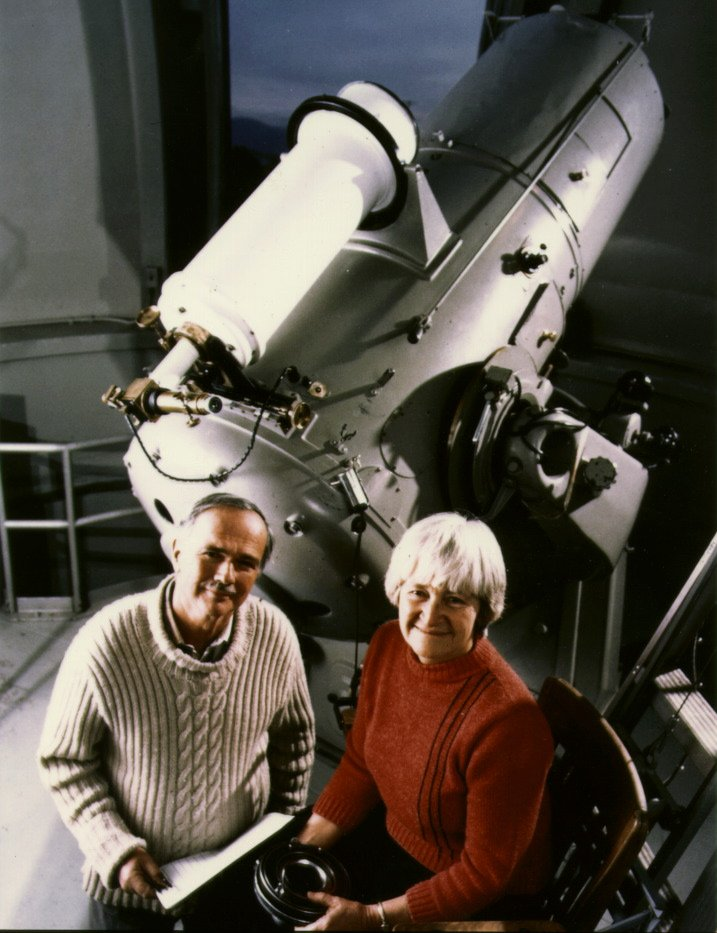
Gene and Carolyn Shoemaker, 1994

While Shoemaker was attending Caltech, his roommate was Richard Spellman, a young man from Chico, California. Although Shoemaker had already enrolled in a doctoral program at Princeton University, he returned to California to serve as best man at Richard's wedding in 1950. He met Richard's sister, Carolyn, for the first time on that occasion. Carolyn was born in Gallup, New Mexico, in 1929, but the Spellman family moved to Chico soon afterward. Carolyn earned degrees from Chico State College in history and political science. She never exhibited an interest in scientific subjects while growing up, and took one geology course in college, which she found boring. Nevertheless, the couple kept in touch while Shoemaker spent the next year in Princeton, followed by a two-week vacation touring the Colorado Plateau. She reportedly told others that listening to Shoemaker explain geology turned a boring subject into an exciting and interesting pursuit of knowledge. The couple married on August 17, 1951.

The Shoemakers had three children: two daughters and one son. Carolyn saw her work as keeping house and raising the children especially after they settled in Flagstaff in the 1960s. She had tried teaching school before they married, but found the work unsatisfying. She also traveled sometimes with Gene, but stopped after she noticed that her absence affected the children. After their children were grown, Carolyn wanted something meaningful to combat the "empty nest" feeling. By then, Gene suggested that she take up astronomy and join his team looking for asteroids approaching Earth. A student working at Lowell Observatory commenced teaching her astronomy. She showed great potential and launched her career as a planetary astronomer at age 51. She continued the work until her death in 2021.

== Scientific contributions ==
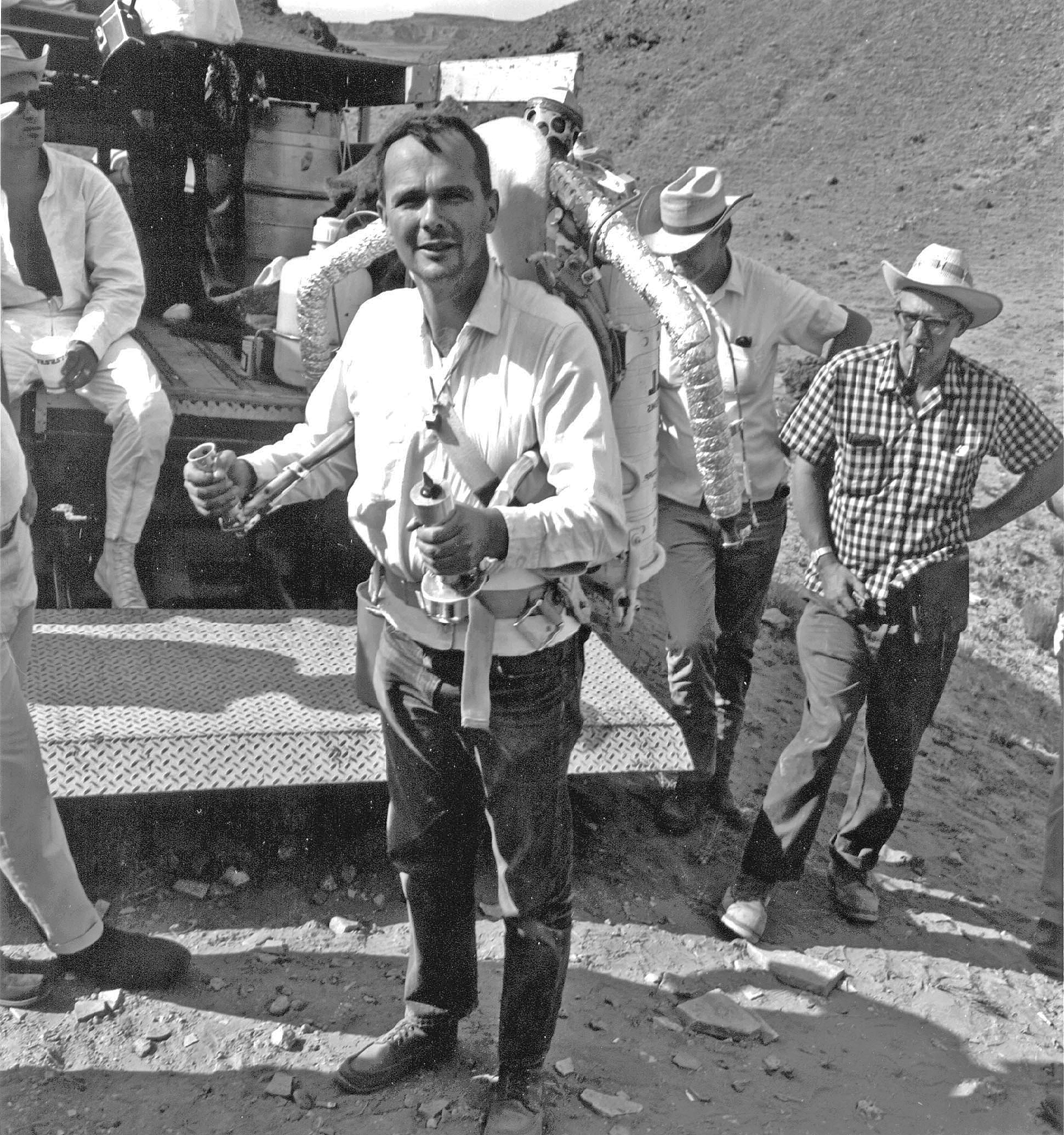
Eugene Shoemaker wearing a Bell Rocket Belt while training astronauts.

The United States Geological Survey (USGS) hired Shoemaker in 1950, and he maintained an association with the organisation for the rest of his career. His first assignment was to search for uranium deposits in Utah and Colorado. His next mission was to study volcanic processes, since other investigators had already noticed that uranium deposits were often located in the vents of ancient volcanoes. This study led him to explore the Hopi Buttes of Northern Arizona, which happened to be near Meteor Crater.

Daniel Barringer, an entrepreneur and mining engineer who had discovered Meteor Crater in 1891, had postulated that it had been caused by the impact of a meteor. About the same time, G. K. Gilbert, the chief geologist of the USGS, examined the crater and announced that it had been created by an explosive venting of volcanic steam. A majority of scientists accepted Gilbert's explanation of the cause of the crater, and it remained the conventional wisdom until Shoemaker's investigations half a century later.

For his PhD degree at Princeton (1960), under the guidance of Harry Hammond Hess, Shoemaker studied the impact dynamics of Barringer Meteor Crater. Shoemaker noted Meteor Crater had the same form and structure as two explosion craters created from atomic bomb tests at the Nevada Test Site, notably Jangle U in 1951 and Teapot Ess in 1955. In 1960, Edward C. T. Chao and Shoemaker identified shocked quartz (coesite) at Meteor Crater, proving the crater was formed from an impact generating extremely high temperatures and pressures. They followed this discovery with the identification of coesite within suevite at Nördlinger Ries, proving its impact origin.

=== Astrogeology and Apollo ===
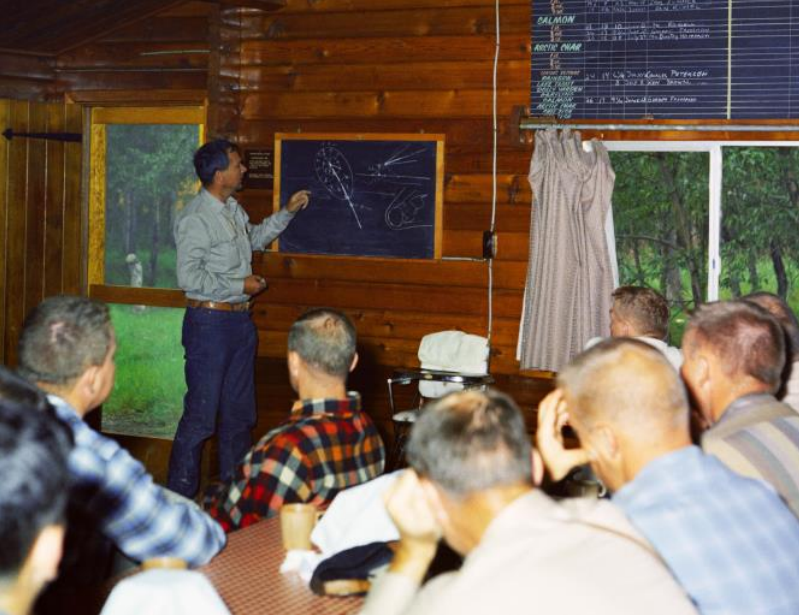
Shoemaker training astronauts at Brooks Camp, Katmai National Park

In 1960, Shoemaker directed a team at the USGS center in Menlo Park, California, to generate the first geological map of the Moon using photographs taken by Francis G. Pease. Shoemaker also helped pioneer the field of astrogeology by founding the Astrogeology Research Program. He was prominently involved in the Lunar Ranger missions to the Moon, joining the television imaging team of Harold Urey and Gerard Kuiper, which turned into a preparatory mission for the future crewed landing. Shoemaker was then chosen to be the principal investigator for the Surveyor program's television experiment, and then the lunar geology principal investigator for Apollo 11, Apollo 12, and Apollo 13.

Shoemaker was also involved in the training of the American astronauts. He himself was a possible candidate for an Apollo Moon flight and was set to be the first geologist to walk on the Moon but was disqualified due to being diagnosed with Addison's disease, a disorder of the adrenal gland. Shoemaker would train astronauts during field trips to Meteor Crater and Sunset Crater near Flagstaff. He was a CBS News television commentator on the early Apollo missions, especially the Apollo 8 and Apollo 11 missions, appearing with Walter Cronkite during live coverage of those flights.

According to David H. Levy, just before the crewed Moon landings,

"With humanity about to set forth upon this new world, geologists and astronomers were divided as to whether the lunar surface was a result of volcanic forces from beneath, or cosmic forces from above. In 1949, Ralph Baldwin had articulated that the Moon's craters were mostly of impact origin and Gene Shoemaker revived the idea again around 1960. He saw craters on the Moon as logical impact sites that were formed not gradually, in eons, but explosively, in seconds."

He was awarded the John Price Wetherill Medal from the Franklin Institute in 1965. Coming to Caltech in 1969, he started a systematic search for Earth orbit-crossing asteroids, which resulted in the discovery of several families of such asteroids, including the Apollo asteroids. Shoemaker advanced the idea that sudden geologic changes can arise from asteroid strikes and that asteroid strikes are common over geologic time periods. Previously, astroblemes were thought to be remnants of extinct volcanoes – even on the Moon.

=== Comet Shoemaker–Levy 9 ===
In 1993, he co-discovered Comet Shoemaker–Levy 9 using the 18-inch Schmidt camera at Palomar Observatory. This comet was unique in that it provided the first opportunity to observe the planetary impact of a comet. Shoemaker–Levy 9 collided with Jupiter in July 1994. The resulting impact caused a massive "scar" on the face of Jupiter.

== Death ==
Shoemaker spent much of his later years searching for and finding several previously unnoticed or undiscovered impact craters around the world. During one such expedition, on July 18, 1997, he died in a head-on car collision on the remote Tanami Track, a few hundred kilometers northwest of Alice Springs, Australia. His wife Carolyn was severely injured in the crash.

On July 31, 1999, some of Shoemaker's ashes were carried to the Moon by the Lunar Prospector space probe in a capsule designed by Carolyn Porco. Celestis, Inc. provided the service—at NASA's request—commercially, making Shoemaker's ashes the first private delivery to the lunar surface. Celestis is the memorial spaceflight company that flew the ashes of Star Trek creator Gene Roddenberry into space, as well as Star Trek actor James Doohan ("Scotty"), Mercury astronaut Gordon Cooper and hundreds of other people from around the world. Shoemaker is the only person whose remains have been placed on any celestial body outside Earth. The brass foil wrapping of Shoemaker's memorial capsule is inscribed with images of Comet Hale–Bopp ("the last comet that the Shoemakers observed together"), the Barringer Meteor Crater, and a quotation from Shakespeare's Romeo and Juliet reading

And, when he shall die
Take him and cut him out in little stars
And he will make the face of heaven so fine
That all the world will be in love with night
And pay no worship to the garish sun.

The fatal crash happened when Hale-Bopp was still visible to the naked eye, having passed perihelion and having moved into the southern celestial hemisphere.

== Awards and tributes ==
Shoemaker received a large number of awards for his professional work. According to the obituary published by the USGS Astrogeology Science Center, these included:

- Doctorate of Science, Arizona State College, Flagstaff, 1965.
- John Price Wetherill Medal of the Franklin Institute, co-recipient with E.C.T. Chao, 1965.
- Arthur S. Flemming Award, 1966.
- Doctorate of Science, Temple University, 1967.
- NASA Medal for Scientific Achievement, 1967.
- U.S. Department of the Interior Honor Award for Meritorious Service, 1973.
- Member, U.S. National Academy of Sciences, 1980.
- U.S. Department of the Interior Distinguished Service Award, 1980.
- Arthur L. Day Medal of the Geological Society of America, 1982.
- G.K. Gilbert Award of the Geological Society of America, 1983.
- Rieser Kulturpreis, co-recipient with E.C.T. Chao and Richard Dehm, 1983.
- Honorary Doctorate of Science, University of Arizona, 1984.
- Barringer Award of the Meteoritical Society, 1984.
- Kuiper Prize of the American Astronomical Society, Division for Planetary Sciences, 1984.
- Leonard Medal of the Meteoritical Society, 1985.
- Distinguished Alumni Award of the California Institute of Technology, 1986.
- Rittenhouse Medal of the Rittenhouse Astronomical Society, co-recipient with C.S. Shoemaker, 1988.
- National Medal of Science, 1992.
- Whipple Award, American Geophysical Union, 1993.
- Fellow, American Academy of Arts and Sciences, 1993.
- AIAA Space Science Award, 1996.
- NASA Exceptional Scientific Achievement Medal, 1996.
- William Bowie Medal, American Geophysical Union, 1996.
- Special Award, American Association of Petroleum Geologists, 1997.
- Shoemaker Award, Texas Section of the American Institute of Professional Geologists, awarded posthumously, 1997.

On July 24, 1997, a memorial for Shoemaker and Jurgen Rahe was presented in the U.S. House of Representatives by California representative George E. Brown Jr. The memorial was published in the Congressional Record. The memorial credited Shoemaker with being either the discoverer or co-discoverer of 820 asteroids and comets during his career. (Note: Rahe was a German-American astronomer and project leader at NASA who was killed in an auto accident near Washington D. C. on June 18, 1997.)

A ring-like topographic feature in Western Australia, an astrobleme previously named the "Teague ring" was renamed "Shoemaker Crater" in honor of Shoemaker. The Near Earth Asteroid Rendezvous space probe was renamed "NEAR Shoemaker" in his honor. It arrived at asteroid 433 Eros in February 2000, and landed on the asteroid after a year of orbital study. He was previously honored with the asteroid 2074 Shoemaker, discovered and named by his colleague, Eleanor F. Helin.

In their 2020 album, Human. :II: Nature., Finnish metal band Nightwish paid tribute to Shoemaker in the song "Shoemaker". Composer Tuomas Holopainen says he was inspired by his biography, which moved the entire band to tears.

== List of discovered minor planets ==
Shoemaker is credited by the Minor Planet Center with the co-discovery of 183 minor planets between 1977 and 1994.

List of minor planets discovered by Eugene Shoemaker

Name	Discovery Date	Listing
2430 Bruce Helin	8 November 1977	list^{[A]}
3025 Higson	20 August 1982	list^{[B]}
3199 Nefertiti	13 September 1982	list^{[B]}
3225 Hoag	20 August 1982	list^{[B]}
3317 Paris	26 May 1984	list^{[B]}
3484 Neugebauer	10 July 1978	list^{[A]}
3554 Amun	4 March 1986	list^{[B]}
3671 Dionysus	27 May 1984	list^{[B]}
3700 Geowilliams	23 October 1984	list^{[B]}
3880 Kaiserman	21 November 1984	list^{[B]}
3927 Feliciaplatt	5 May 1981	list^{[B]}
4151 Alanhale	24 April 1985	list^{[B]}
4197 Morpheus	11 October 1982	list^{[A]}
4379 Snelling	13 August 1988	list^{[B]}
4450 Pan	25 September 1987	list^{[B]}
4525 Johnbauer	15 May 1982	list^{[A]}^{[C]}
4899 Candace	9 May 1988	list^{[B]}
4946 Askalaphus	21 January 1988	list^{[B]}
5023 Agapenor	11 October 1985	list^{[B]}
5029 Ireland	24 January 1988	list^{[B]}
5052 Nancyruth	23 October 1984	list^{[B]}
5167 Joeharms	11 April 1985	list^{[B]}
5168 Jenner	6 March 1986	list^{[B]}
5175 Ables	4 November 1988	list^{[B]}
5211 Stevenson	8 July 1989	list^{[B]}
5259 Epeigeus	30 January 1989	list^{[B]}
5264 Telephus	17 May 1991	list^{[B]}
5284 Orsilocus	1 February 1989	list^{[B]}
5285 Krethon	9 March 1989	list^{[B]}
5430 Luu	12 May 1988	list^{[B]}
5436 Eumelos	20 February 1990	list^{[B]}
5511 Cloanthus	8 October 1988	list^{[B]}
5551 Glikson	24 January 1982	list^{[B]}
5579 Uhlherr	11 May 1988	list^{[B]}
5632 Ingelehmann	15 April 1993	list^{[B]}
5637 Gyas	10 September 1988	list^{[B]}
5638 Deikoon	10 October 1988	list^{[B]}
5652 Amphimachus	24 April 1992	list^{[B]}
5670 Rosstaylor	7 November 1985	list^{[B]}
5720 Halweaver	29 March 1984	list^{[B]}
5725 Nördlingen	23 January 1988	list^{[B]}
5726 Rubin	24 January 1988	list^{[B]}
5731 Zeus	4 November 1988	list^{[B]}
5765 Izett	4 April 1986	list^{[B]}
5863 Tara	7 September 1983	list^{[B]}
5899 Jedicke	9 January 1986	list^{[B]}
5947 Bonnie	21 March 1985	list^{[B]}
5953 Shelton	25 April 1987	list^{[B]}
5957 Irina	11 May 1988	list^{[B]}
5999 Plescia	23 April 1987	list^{[B]}
6063 Jason	27 May 1984	list^{[B]}
6084 Bascom	12 February 1985	list^{[B]}
6087 Lupo	19 March 1988	list^{[B]}
6179 Brett	3 March 1986	list^{[B]}
6239 Minos	31 August 1989	list^{[B]}
6372 Walker	13 May 1985	list^{[B]}
6376 Schamp	29 May 1987	list^{[B]}
6398 Timhunter	10 February 1991	list^{[B]}^{[D]}
6401 Roentgen	15 April 1991	list^{[B]}^{[D]}
6436 Coco	13 May 1985	list^{[B]}
6478 Gault	12 May 1988	list^{[B]}
6485 Wendeesther	25 October 1990	list^{[B]}^{[D]}
6510 Tarry	23 February 1987	list^{[B]}
6543 Senna	11 October 1985	list^{[B]}
6585 O'Keefe	26 September 1984	list^{[B]}
6635 Zuber	26 September 1987	list^{[B]}
6740 Goff	14 April 1993	list^{[B]}
6901 Roybishop	2 August 1989	list^{[B]}
6909 Levison	19 January 1991	list^{[B]}
7051 Sean	13 May 1985	list^{[B]}
7086 Bopp	5 October 1991	list^{[B]}
7088 Ishtar	1 January 1992	list^{[B]}
7092 Cadmus	4 June 1992	list^{[B]}
7112 Ghislaine	3 April 1986	list^{[B]}
7119 Hiera	11 January 1989	list^{[B]}
7167 Laupheim	12 October 1985	list^{[B]}
7173 Sepkoski	15 August 1988	list^{[B]}
7480 Norwan	1 August 1994	list^{[B]}
7549 Woodard	9 October 1980	list^{[B]}
7560 Spudis	10 January 1986	list^{[B]}
7749 Jackschmitt	12 May 1988	list^{[B]}
7750 McEwen	18 August 1988	list^{[B]}
7756 Scientia	27 March 1990	list^{[B]}
7778 Markrobinson	17 April 1993	list^{[B]}
7958 Leakey	5 June 1994	list^{[B]}
8034 Akka	3 June 1992	list^{[B]}
8149 Ruff	11 May 1985	list^{[B]}
8326 Paulkling	6 May 1981	list^{[B]}
8327 Weihenmayer	6 May 1981	list^{[B]}
8347 Lallaward	21 April 1987	list^{[B]}
8356 Wadhwa	3 September 1989	list^{[B]}
8373 Stephengould	1 January 1992	list^{[B]}
8709 Kadlu	14 May 1994	list^{[B]}
8804 Eliason	5 May 1981	list^{[B]}

Name	Discovery Date	Listing
8810 Johnmcfarland	15 May 1982	list^{[A]}
8817 Roytraver	13 May 1985	list^{[B]}
9016 Henrymoore	10 January 1986	list^{[B]}
9022 Drake	14 August 1988	list^{[B]}
9023 Mnesthus	10 September 1988	list^{[B]}
9082 Leonardmartin	4 November 1994	list^{[B]}
9165 Raup	27 September 1987	list^{[B]}
9172 Abhramu	29 July 1989	list^{[B]}
9277 Togashi	9 October 1980	list^{[B]}
9299 Vinceteri	13 May 1985	list^{[B]}
9564 Jeffwynn	26 September 1987	list^{[B]}
9744 Nielsen	9 May 1988	list^{[B]}
9768 Stephenmaran	5 April 1992	list^{[B]}
10041 Parkinson	24 April 1985	list^{[B]}
10044 Squyres	15 September 1985	list^{[B]}
10060 Amymilne	12 April 1988	list^{[B]}
10108 Tomlinson	26 April 1992	list^{[B]}
10295 Hippolyta	12 April 1988	list^{[B]}
10487 Danpeterson	14 April 1985	list^{[B]}
10563 Izhdubar	19 November 1993	list^{[B]}
10683 Carter	10 June 1980	list^{[B]}
10739 Lowman	12 May 1988	list^{[B]}
(10995) 1978 NS	10 July 1978	list^{[A]}
11006 Gilson	9 October 1980	list^{[B]}
11066 Sigurd	9 February 1992	list^{[B]}
11277 Ballard	8 October 1988	list^{[B]}
11311 Peleus	10 December 1993	list^{[B]}
11836 Eileen	5 February 1986	list^{[B]}
12227 Penney	11 October 1985	list^{[B]}
12237 Coughlin	23 April 1987	list^{[B]}
12242 Koon	18 August 1988	list^{[B]}
12675 Chabot	9 October 1980	list^{[B]}
12714 Alkimos	15 April 1991	list^{[B]}
12753 Povenmire	18 April 1993	list^{[B]}
(12977) 1978 NC	10 July 1978	list^{[A]}
13062 Podarkes	19 April 1991	list^{[B]}
13937 Roberthargraves	2 August 1989	list^{[B]}
14827 Hypnos	5 May 1986	list^{[B]}
14835 Holdridge	26 November 1987	list^{[B]}
15228 Ronmiller	23 February 1987	list^{[B]}
15304 Wikberg	21 October 1992	list^{[B]}
(16397) 1982 JS_{2}	15 May 1982	list^{[A]}
16452 Goldfinger	28 September 1989	list^{[B]}
16641 Esteban	16 August 1993	list^{[B]}
(17355) 1978 NK	10 July 1978	list^{[A]}
17399 Andysanto	6 September 1983	list^{[B]}
17408 McAdams	19 October 1987	list^{[B]}
19140 Jansmit	2 September 1989	list^{[B]}
19173 Virginiaterése	15 April 1991	list^{[B]}
19243 Bunting	10 February 1994	list^{[B]}
(19920) 1978 NF	10 July 1978	list^{[A]}
20007 Marybrown	7 June 1991	list^{[B]}
20037 Duke	20 October 1992	list^{[B]}
21062 Iasky	13 May 1991	list^{[B]}
21148 Billramsey	16 April 1993	list^{[B]}
21149 Kenmitchell	19 April 1993	list^{[B]}
22294 Simmons	28 September 1989	list^{[B]}
23452 Drew	18 August 1988	list^{[B]}
24626 Astrowizard	9 October 1980	list^{[B]}
24643 MacCready	28 September 1984	list^{[B]}
24654 Fossett	29 May 1987	list^{[B]}
24761 Ahau	28 January 1993	list^{[B]}
26879 Haines	9 July 1994	list^{[B]}
27706 Strogen	11 October 1985	list^{[B]}
27711 Kirschvink	4 November 1988	list^{[B]}
29133 Vargas	29 May 1987	list^{[B]}
29137 Alanboss	18 October 1987	list^{[B]}
29146 McHone	17 March 1988	list^{[B]}
30767 Chriskraft	6 November 1983	list^{[B]}
30779 Sankt-Stephan	17 October 1987	list^{[B]}
30785 Greeley	13 August 1988	list^{[B]}
30786 Karkoschka	18 August 1988	list^{[B]}
30844 Hukeller	17 May 1991	list^{[B]}
32776 Nriag	29 May 1987	list^{[B]}
35056 Cullers	28 September 1984	list^{[B]}
37609 LaVelle	25 November 1992	list^{[B]}
37655 Illapa	1 August 1994	list^{[B]}
43763 Russert	30 May 1987	list^{[B]}
48416 Carmelita	24 January 1988	list^{[B]}
(52229) 1978 NN	10 July 1978	list^{[A]}
(52230) 1978 NR	10 July 1978	list^{[A]}
52266 Van Flandern	10 January 1986	list^{[B]}
65672 Merrick	16 August 1988	list^{[B]}
73670 Kurthopf	19 August 1982	list^{[B]}
79117 Brydonejack	16 August 1988	list^{[B]}
(99954) 1978 NH	10 July 1978	list^{[A]}
(129437) 1978 NG	10 July 1978	list^{[A]}
(136564) 1977 VA	7 November 1977	list^{[A]}
(408751) 1987 SF_{3}	26 September 1987	list^{[B]}
Co-discovery made with:^{A} E. F. Helin^{B} C. S. Shoemaker^{C} P. D. Wilder^{D} D. H. Levy

== Bibliography ==
- Farley, K. A.; Montanari, A.; Shoemaker, E. M.; Shoemaker, C. S. (May 22, 1998), "Geochemical evidence for a comet shower in the late Eocene", Science, vol. 280, no. 5367, pp. 1250–1253, Bibcode:1998Sci...280.1250F, doi:10.1126/science.280.5367.1250, PMID 9596575
- Nozette, S. D.; Lichtenberg, C. L.; Spudis, P. D.; Bonner, R.; Ort, W.; Malaret, E.; Robinson, M. S.; Shoemaker, E. M. (November 29, 1996), "The Clementine bistatic radar experiment", Science, vol. 274, no. 5292, pp. 1495–1498, Bibcode:1996Sci...274.1495N, doi:10.1126/science.274.5292.1495, hdl:2060/19970023672, PMID 8929403, S2CID 5275759
- Shoemaker, E. M.; Robinson, M. S.; Eliason, E. M. (December 16, 1994), "The South Pole Region of the Moon as Seen by Clementine", Science, vol. 266, no. 5192, pp. 1851–1854, Bibcode:1994Sci...266.1851S, doi:10.1126/science.266.5192.1851, PMID 17737080, S2CID 41734505
- Nozette, S. D.; Rustan, P. L.; Pleasance, L. D.; Kordas, J. F.; Lewis, I. T.; Park, H. S.; Priest, R. E.; Horan, D. M.; et al. (December 16, 1994), "The Clementine Mission to the Moon: Scientific Overview", Science, vol. 266, no. 5192, pp. 1835–1839, Bibcode:1994Sci...266.1835N, doi:10.1126/science.266.5192.1835, PMID 17737076, S2CID 36702160
- Weaver, H. A.; Feldman, P. D.; A'Hearn, M. F.; Arpigny, C.; Brown, R. A.; Helin, E. F.; Levy, D. H.; Marsden, B. G.; et al. (February 11, 1994), "Hubble Space Telescope Observations of Comet P/Shoemaker–Levy 9 (1993e)", Science, vol. 263, no. 5148, pp. 787–791, Bibcode:1994Sci...263..787W, doi:10.1126/science.263.5148.787, PMID 17770832, S2CID 1179131
- Soderblom, L. A.; Kieffer, S. W.; Becker, T. L.; Brown, R. H.; Cook, A. F. 2nd; Hansen, C. J.; Johnson, T. V.; Kirk, R. L.; Shoemaker, E. M. (October 19, 1990), "Triton's Geyser-Like Plumes: Discovery and Basic Characterization", Science, 250 (4979): 410–415, Bibcode:1990Sci...250..410S, doi:10.1126/science.250.4979.410, PMID 17793016, S2CID 1948948
- Kring, D.A., (2007) "Guidebook to the Geology of Barringer Meteorite Crater, Arizona (a.k.a. Meteor Crater)". Lunar and Planetary Institute contribution No. 1355
- Smith, B. A.; Soderblom, L. A.; Banfield, D.; Barnet, C. D.; Basilevsky, A. T.; Beebe, R. F.; Bollinger, K.; Boyce, J. M.; et al. (December 15, 1989), "Voyager 2 at Neptune: Imaging Science Results", Science, vol. 246, no. 4936, pp. 1422–1449, Bibcode:1989Sci...246.1422S, doi:10.1126/science.246.4936.1422, PMID 17755997, S2CID 45403579, archived from the original on August 4, 2020
- Smith, B. A.; Soderblom, L. A.; Beebe, A.; Bliss, D.; Boyce, J. M.; Brahic, A.; Briggs, G. A.; Brown, R. H.; Collins, S. A. (July 4, 1986). "Voyager 2 in the Uranian System: Imaging Science Results". Science. 233 (4759): 43–64. Bibcode:1986Sci...233...43S. doi:10.1126/science.233.4759.43. PMID 17812889. S2CID 5895824. Archived from the original on October 23, 2018.
- Cook, A. F.; Shoemaker, E. M.; Smith, B. A.; Danielson, G. E.; Johnson, T. V.; Synnott, S. P. (March 27, 1981), "Volcanic Origin of the Eruptive Plumes on Io", Science, vol. 211, no. 4489, pp. 1419–1422, Bibcode:1981Sci...211.1419C, doi:10.1126/science.211.4489.1419, PMID 17731183
- Smith, B. A.; Soderblom, L. A.; Beebe, R. F.; Boyce, J. M.; Briggs, G. A.; Carr, M. H.; Collins, S. A.; Cook, A. F. 2nd; et al. (November 23, 1979), "The Galilean Satellites and Jupiter: Voyager 2 Imaging Science Results", Science, vol. 206, no. 4421, pp. 927–950, Bibcode:1979Sci...206..927S, doi:10.1126/science.206.4421.927, PMID 17733910, S2CID 22465607
- Smith, B. A.; Soderblom, L. A.; Johnson, T. V.; Ingersoll, A. P.; Collins, S. A.; Shoemaker, E. M.; Hunt, G. E.; Masursky, H.; et al. (June 1, 1979), "The Jupiter System Through the Eyes of Voyager 1", Science, 204 (4396): 951–972, Bibcode:1979Sci...204..951S, doi:10.1126/science.204.4396.951, PMID 17800430, S2CID 33147728
- Shoemaker, E. M.; Hait, M. H.; Swann, G. A.; Schleicher, D. L.; Dahlem, D. H.; Schaber, G. G.; Sutton, R. L. (January 30, 1970), "Lunar Regolith at Tranquillity Base", Science, 167 (3918): 452–455, Bibcode:1970Sci...167..452S, doi:10.1126/science.167.3918.452, PMID 17781449, S2CID 11397998
- Shoemaker, E. M.; Batson, R. M.; Holt, H. E.; Morris, E. C.; Rennilson, J. J.; Whitaker, E. A. (November 3, 1967), "Surveyor V: Television Pictures", Science, vol. 158, no. 3801, pp. 642–652, Bibcode:1967Sci...158..642S, doi:10.1126/science.158.3801.642, PMID 17732959, S2CID 44266405
- Gault, D. E.; Adams, J. B.; Collins, R. J.; Green, J.; Kuiper, G. P.; Mazursky, H.; O'Keefe, J. A.; Phinney, R. A.; Shoemaker, E. M. (November 3, 1967), "Surveyor V: Discussion of Chemical Analysis", Science, vol. 158, no. 3801, pp. 641–642, Bibcode:1967Sci...158..641G, doi:10.1126/science.158.3801.641, PMID 17732958, S2CID 41807553
- Chao, E. C. T.; Shoemaker, E. M.; Madsen, B. M. (July 22, 1960), "First Natural Occurrence of Coesite", Science, vol. 132, no. 3421, pp. 220–222, Bibcode:1960Sci...132..220C, doi:10.1126/science.132.3421.220, PMID 17748937, S2CID 45197811
