= 2074 Shoemaker =

Hungaria asteroid, Mars-crosser and suspected synchronous binary system

Discovery
- Discovered by: E. F. Helin
- Discovery site: Palomar Obs.
- Discovery date: 17 October 1974

Designations
- Named after: Eugene Shoemaker (American astronomer)
- Alternative designations: 1974 UA
- Minor planet category: Mars-crosser · Hungaria

Orbital characteristics
- Epoch 4 September 2017 (JD 2458000.5)
- Uncertainty parameter 0
- Observation arc: 63.23 yr (23,096 days)
- Aphelion: 1.9472 AU
- Perihelion: 1.6521 AU
- Semi-major axis: 1.7996 AU
- Eccentricity: 0.0820
- Orbital period (sidereal): 2.41 yr (882 days)
- Mean anomaly: 243.44°
- Mean motion: 0° 24^{m} 29.88^{s} / day
- Inclination: 30.080°
- Longitude of ascending node: 207.29°
- Argument of perihelion: 205.58°
- Earth MOID: 0.6680 AU · 260.2 LD

Physical characteristics
- Dimensions: 3.18±0.51 km 3.217±0.558 km 4.93 km (calculated)
- Synodic rotation period: 2.5328±0.0004 h 2.5331±0.0002 h (Note: Warner (2018b) web. Not yet in ADS. Observation 30 June 2017. Rotation period of 2.5331±0.0002 hours with a brightness amplitude of 0.09±0.01 mag. Quality code of 3. Summary figures for (2074) Shoemaker at Collaborative Asteroid Lightcurve Link (CALL)) (Note: Lightcurve plot of (2074) Shoemaker, Warner (2017), rotation period: 2.5331 hours; and second period (P2) of 44.28 hours. Quality code of 3.); 2.5338±0.0002 h 2.534±0.001 h 2.809±0.001 h (Note: Lightcurve plot of (2074) Shoemaker, Warner (2015), period: of 2.809 and 2.515 hours. Quality code of 2.); 2.82±0.01 h 57.02±0.10 h
- Geometric albedo: 0.20 (assumed); 0.41±0.13; 0.518±0.211
- Spectral type: SMASS = Sa · S
- Absolute magnitude (H): 13.80 · 13.9 · 14.24 · 14.28±0.36

2074 Shoemaker, provisional designation 1974 UA, is a stony Hungaria asteroid, Mars-crosser and suspected synchronous binary system from the innermost regions of the asteroid belt, approximately 4 kilometers in diameter. It was discovered on 17 October 1974, by astronomer Eleanor Helin at the Palomar Observatory. She named it after American astronomer Eugene Shoemaker.

== Orbit and classification ==
Shoemaker is a bright member of the dynamical Hungaria group that forms the innermost dense concentration of asteroids in the Solar System. It orbits the Sun in the inner main-belt at a distance of 1.7–1.9 AU once every 2 years and 5 months (882 days). Its orbit has an eccentricity of 0.08 and an inclination of 30° with respect to the ecliptic. With a perihelion of 1.6521 AU, Shoemaker is a Mars-crossing asteroid as it crosses the orbit of Mars at 1.666 AU.

The body's observation arc begins with a precovery taken at Palomar in April 1954, more than 20 years prior to its official discovery observation.

== Physical characteristics ==
In the SMASS classification, Shoemaker is a Sa-subtype, that transitions form the common stony S-type asteroids to the A-type asteroids.

=== Rotation period ===
Several rotational lightcurve of Shoemaker were obtained from photometric observations by American astronomer Brian Warner at his Palmer Divide Observatory (716) and CS3-Station (U82). Analysis of the best-rated lightcurves gave a well-defined rotation period of 2.5328 hours with a brightness amplitude of 0.13 magnitude (U=3).

=== Suspected binary ===
In October 2003, photometric observations of Shoemaker by Robert D. Stephens gave a long rotation period of 57.02 hours. After re-measuring the images with newer software and calibration techniques, two mutual occultation and eclipsing events were found, indicating that Shoemaker might be a synchronous binary asteroid with a minor-planet moon orbiting it every 55 hours. Observations in 2010, were difficult due to incomplete coverage and gave an orbital period of 27.39 hours for the secondary. Observations by astronomers at Etscorn Campus Observatory (719) in 2015, did not mention any mutual events.

In June 2017, Warner measured a rotation period of 2.5331±0.0002 hours and an orbital period for the secondary of 44.28 hours at his CS3-Palmer Divide Station in California. The binary nature of Shoemaker remains unconfirmed.

=== Diameter and albedo ===
According to the survey carried out by the NEOWISE mission of NASA's Wide-field Infrared Survey Explorer, Shoemaker measures 3.18 and 3.22 kilometers in diameter and its surface has an albedo between 0.41 and 0.52, respectively. The Collaborative Asteroid Lightcurve Link assumes a standard albedo for stony asteroids of 0.20 and calculates a diameter of 4.93 kilometers based on an absolute magnitude of 13.9.

== Naming ==
This minor planet was named by the discoverer after her colleague, the American astronomer Eugene Shoemaker (1928–1997), who was a discoverer of minor planets and of the Comet Shoemaker–Levy 9 that collided with Jupiter. He is well known for his work on impact craters and his role in the lunar Ranger, Surveyor and Apollo programs.

The naming was also proposed by Brian G. Marsden, the director of the Minor Planet Center (MPC). The official naming citation was published by the Minor Planet Center on 1 November 1978 (M.P.C. 4548).
