= 6376 Schamp =

Main-belt asteroid

Discovery
- Discovered by: C. Shoemaker; E. Shoemaker
- Discovery site: Palomar Obs.
- Discovery date: 29 May 1987

Designations
- Named after: Larry and Becky Schamp (Shoemaker family friends)
- Alternative designations: 1987 KD_{1} · 1971 SG; 1991 JL_{1}
- Minor planet category: main-belt · (middle) background

Orbital characteristics
- Epoch 23 March 2018 (JD 2458200.5)
- Uncertainty parameter 0
- Observation arc: 46.32 yr (16,917 d)
- Aphelion: 3.2315 AU
- Perihelion: 1.9187 AU
- Semi-major axis: 2.5751 AU
- Eccentricity: 0.2549
- Orbital period (sidereal): 4.13 yr (1,509 d)
- Mean anomaly: 144.85°
- Mean motion: 0° 14^{m} 18.6^{s} / day
- Inclination: 16.353°
- Longitude of ascending node: 159.76°
- Argument of perihelion: 123.70°

Physical characteristics
- Mean diameter: 7.924±0.068 km 8.18 km (calculated)
- Synodic rotation period: 6.6093±0.0003 h (Note: Lightcurve plot of (6376) Schamp rotation period 6.6093±0.0003 hours with a brightness amplitude of 0.16±0.01 mag. Quality Code is 3. Summary figures at Pravec, P.; Wolf, M.; Sarounova, L. (2012) and LCDB); 6.613±0.001 h
- Geometric albedo: 0.20 (assumed); 0.213±0.043
- Spectral type: S (Pan-STARRS); S (SDSS-MOC)
- Absolute magnitude (H): 12.8; 12.9; 13.20±0.24

6376 Schamp, provisional designation 1987 KD_{1}, is a stony background asteroid from the central regions of the asteroid belt, approximately 8 kilometers (5 miles) in diameter. It was discovered on 29 May 1987, by American astronomer couple Carolyn and Eugene Shoemaker at the Palomar Observatory in California. The S-type asteroid has a rotation period of 6.6 hours. It was named after Larry and Becky Schamp who took care of the Shoemaker family after Eugene's fatal car accident in Australia.

== Orbit and classification ==
Schamp is a non-family asteroid from the main belt's background population. It orbits the Sun in the central main-belt at a distance of 1.9–3.2 AU once every 4 years and 2 months (1,509 days; semi-major axis of 2.58 AU). Its orbit has an eccentricity of 0.25 and an inclination of 16° with respect to the ecliptic. The body's observation arc begins with its first observation as 1971 SG at the Leoncito Astronomical Complex in September 1971, almost 16 years prior to its official discovery observation at Palomar.

== Physical characteristics ==
Schamp has been characterized as a common, stony S-type asteroid by Pan-STARRS' survey and in the SDSS-based taxonomy.

=== Rotation period ===
In July 2012, two rotational lightcurves of Schamp were obtained from photometric observations by Petr Pravec and Robert Stephens. Lightcurve analysis gave a well-defined rotation period of 6.6093 and 6.613 hours with an identical brightness amplitude of 0.16 magnitude (U=3/3).

=== Diameter and albedo ===
According to the survey carried out by the NEOWISE mission of NASA's Wide-field Infrared Survey Explorer, Schamp measures 7.924 kilometers in diameter and its surface has an albedo of 0.213, while the Collaborative Asteroid Lightcurve Link assumes a standard albedo for a stony asteroid of 0.20 and calculates a diameter of 8.18 kilometers based on an absolute magnitude of 12.8.

== Naming ==
This minor planet was named after Americans stationed in Alice Springs, Larry and Becky Schamp, who cared for members of the Shoemaker family after an automobile accident in which Eugene Shoemaker died in 1997. The official naming citation was published by the Minor Planet Center on 11 April 1998 (M.P.C. 31610).
