= 11277 Ballard =

Asteroid

Discovery
- Discovered by: C. Shoemaker; E. Shoemaker
- Discovery site: Palomar Obs.
- Discovery date: 8 October 1988

Designations
- Named after: Robert Ballard (American oceanographer)
- Alternative designations: 1988 TW_{2} · 1995 MG
- Minor planet category: main-belt · (inner); Phocaea

Orbital characteristics
- Epoch 23 March 2018 (JD 2458200.5)
- Uncertainty parameter 0
- Observation arc: 28.73 yr (10,493 d)
- Aphelion: 2.9757 AU
- Perihelion: 1.8295 AU
- Semi-major axis: 2.4026 AU
- Eccentricity: 0.2385
- Orbital period (sidereal): 3.72 yr (1,360 d)
- Mean anomaly: 22.337°
- Mean motion: 0° 15^{m} 52.92^{s} / day
- Inclination: 22.787°
- Longitude of ascending node: 254.59°
- Argument of perihelion: 43.574°

Physical characteristics
- Mean diameter: 6.298±0.075 km
- Synodic rotation period: >10 h
- Geometric albedo: 0.222
- Spectral type: S (assumed)
- Absolute magnitude (H): 13.00; 13.10; 13.53

11277 Ballard (provisional designation 1988 TW_{2}) is a Phocaea asteroid from the inner regions of the asteroid belt, approximately 6.3 kilometers (3.9 miles) in diameter. It was discovered on 8 October 1988, by American astronomer couple Carolyn and Eugene Shoemaker at the Palomar Observatory in California. The assumed S-type asteroid has a rotation period of at least 10 hours. It was named for American marine scientist Robert Ballard.

== Orbit and classification ==
Ballard is a member of the Phocaea family (701). It orbits the Sun in the inner asteroid belt at a distance of 1.83–2.98 AU once every 3 years and 9 months (1,360 days; semi-major axis of 2.4 AU). Its orbit has an eccentricity of 0.24 and an inclination of 23° with respect to the ecliptic. The body's observation arc begins with a precovery taken at Palomar in September 1988, just four weeks prior to its official discovery observation. Ballard is not a Mars-crosser, since its aphelion is larger than 1.67 AU.

== Naming ==
This minor planet was named after American marine scientist Robert Ballard (born 1942), a professor of oceanography and director of the Deep Submergence Laboratory, who is known for the discovery of the RMS Titanic and the German battleship Bismarck. The official naming citation was published by the Minor Planet Center on 26 May 2002 (M.P.C. 45748).

== Physical characteristics ==
Ballard is an assumed, stony S-type asteroid, in line with the Phocaea family's overall spectral type.

=== Rotation period ===
In July 2010, a rotational lightcurve of Ballard was obtained from two nights of photometric observations in the R-band by Italian astronomer Albino Carbognani at the OAVdA Observatory (B04) in Italy. Lightcurve analysis gave a tentative rotation period of at least 10 hours with a brightness amplitude of more than 0.25 magnitude (U=2-).

=== Diameter and albedo ===
According to the survey carried out by the NEOWISE mission of NASA's Wide-field Infrared Survey Explorer, Ballard measures between 5.65 and 6.445 kilometers in diameter and its surface has an albedo between 0.19 and 0.289.

The Collaborative Asteroid Lightcurve Link assumes an albedo of 0.23 – derived from the family's largest member, 25 Phocaea – and calculates a diameter of 6.65 kilometers based on an absolute magnitude of 13.1.
