= Center for Ocean Exploration and Archaeological Oceanography =

The Center for Ocean Exploration and Archaeological Oceanography is a research program for students at the University of Rhode Island's Graduate School of Oceanography. It began during the 2004–2005 academic year. It combines oceanography, ocean engineering, maritime history, anthropology and archaeology.

== History ==
The program was established by Robert Ballard in 2003, as the Institute for Archeological Oceanography. The first academic year, 2004–2005, the program had five students.

== Academics ==
The program will earn students two degrees: a master's degree in archeology and a doctorate in oceanography. The current focus of the institute is projects in the Black Sea and the eastern Mediterranean. These projects use advanced unmanned submersible equipment to observe underwater sites, and attempt to go to deeper water than in the past. Students are required to earn 92 credits- more than any other Ph.D program. However, 6 credits from each degree may be counted toward the other, hence 12 less credits are required. Although other schools offer degrees in archeology and oceanography, this is the first to combine them into a formal curriculum.
