= JASON Project =

American science education organization

- Formation: 1989
- Founder: Robert Ballard
- Website: www.jason.org

The JASON Project is a US K-12 science curriculum program that is designed to motivate and inspire students to pursue interests and careers in science, technology, engineering and mathematics.

The JASON Project's approach to science education immerses students in real-world situations where they are mentored by scientists from organizations like NASA, NOAA, the U.S. Department of Energy, and parent company National Geographic Society. JASON creates these connections using educational games, videos, live interactivity and social networking to embed its partners' research in the curriculum.

== History ==
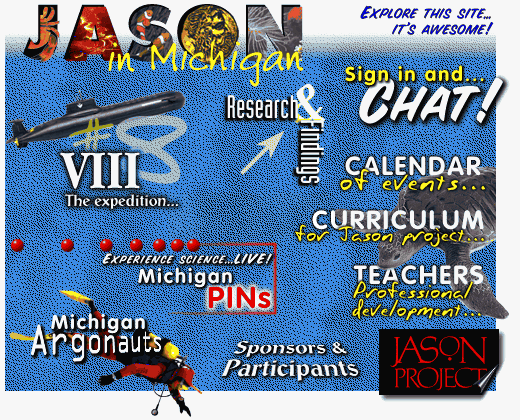
Original Website Layout from 1997 as designed by Jeff Smeenge

The JASON Project was started in 1989 by Robert Ballard, the oceanographer who discovered the wreck of the RMS Titanic. The JASON Foundation for Education was founded in 1990 as a 501(c)(3) non-profit organization to administer the project. The Foundation became a subsidiary of the National Geographic Society in 2005.

The project won a scientific public engagement award from the American Association for the Advancement of Science, and Computerworld's Smithsonian Award for its use of technology. The JASON curricula are available in print and free online, aligned to national and state standards. The JASON Mission Center contains all student and teacher content, communications systems, digital experiences, and tools to manage, assess and track student performance and online usage.

JASON curricula are available free online, free print-on-demand and in print editions for purchase.
