= Pedro Rustan =

American aerospace engineer (1946-2012)

Pedro Luis Rustan
- Born: Pedro Luis Rustan; December 29, 1946; Guantánamo City, Cuba
- Died: June 28, 2012 (aged 65); Woodbridge, Virginia, U.S.
- Education: Illinois Institute of Technology (BS, MS); University of Florida (PhD)
- Occupations: Electrical engineer; military officer
- Years active: 1971–2011
- Employer(s): United States Air Force; National Reconnaissance Office
- Known for: Clementine lunar mission; space systems acquisition
- Spouse: Alexandra Cary Rustan
- Children: 2

Pedro Luis "Pete" Rustan (December 29, 1946 – June 28, 2012) was a Cuban-born American electrical engineer, United States Air Force officer, and senior official at the National Reconnaissance Office (NRO). He is best known for leading the Clementine lunar mission and for advocating rapid, lower-cost spacecraft development and acquisition approaches within U.S. defense and intelligence space programs.

== Early life and education ==
Rustan was born on December 29, 1946, in Guantánamo City, Cuba, approximately 40 miles from the U.S. Naval Base at Guantánamo Bay. His father was a labor leader who was later imprisoned following the Cuban Revolution. In August 1967, Rustan and his family escaped Cuba by secretly boarding a sugar railroad boxcar and jumping off near the U.S. naval base. They crossed a swamp on foot, scaled perimeter fences, and were taken into U.S. custody before being granted political asylum in the United States.

After settling in the United States, Rustan worked in electronics testing before pursuing higher education. He earned a Bachelor of Science degree in electrical engineering in 1970 and a Master of Science degree in 1971 from the Illinois Institute of Technology.

He later completed a Ph.D. in electrical engineering at the University of Florida in 1979. His doctoral dissertation, Properties of Lightning Derived from Time Series Analysis of VHF Radiation Data, focused on the electromagnetic characteristics of lightning using time-series analysis.

== Military service and scientific research ==
Rustan was drafted into the United States Air Force in 1971 and initially served as an enlisted airman before attending Officer Candidate School and receiving a commission. During his Air Force career, he conducted research on electromagnetic interference and lightning effects on aircraft and spacecraft systems.

He co-authored peer-reviewed studies on lightning source localization using very high frequency (VHF) radiation data, including research conducted at Kennedy Space Center using difference-in-time-of-arrival (DTOA) techniques. This work contributed to improved understanding of lightning-induced hazards to aerospace systems.

According to an official NRO biographical publication, Rustan managed or contributed to seven spacecraft development programs during his Air Force career, emphasizing accelerated development timelines and reduced acquisition costs.

== Clementine mission ==
In the early 1990s, Rustan served as mission and project manager for the Clementine mission, a joint Department of Defense and NASA program conducted under the Ballistic Missile Defense Organization. Launched in 1994, the spacecraft performed lunar mapping and technology demonstration experiments.

Under Rustan’s leadership, Clementine was designed, built, and tested in approximately 22 months at a cost of roughly $75–80 million, substantially less than prior planetary missions. The spacecraft returned more than 1.8 million images of the Moon and produced radar and optical data later interpreted as evidence of water ice at the lunar south pole.

Rustan was also a principal author of NASA technical reports describing the Clementine engineering experiments program, which tested advanced spacecraft electronics and sensors in the deep-space radiation environment.

== National Reconnaissance Office ==
After retiring from the Air Force in 1997 with the rank of colonel, Rustan joined the National Reconnaissance Office, the U.S. agency responsible for developing and operating reconnaissance satellites.

At the NRO, he served in several senior leadership roles, including Director of Advanced Systems and Technology, Director of Small Satellite Development, Director of Mission Support, and the first Director of the Ground Enterprise Directorate.

In these roles, Rustan promoted acquisition approaches emphasizing rapid prototyping, reduced development timelines, and the use of smaller and more distributed satellite systems. In a biography accompanying an article Rustan wrote in a 2008 National Reconnaissance Office publication he is described as an advocate for building smaller cheaper satellite constellations, using rapid prototyping, and selecting systems for best value.

== Honors and recognition ==
Rustan received the Philip J. Klass Lifetime Achievement Award from Aviation Week & Space Technology in 2012 for contributions to spacecraft systems supporting U.S. intelligence, surveillance, and reconnaissance missions.

Additional recognitions attributed to his career include the NASA Outstanding Leadership Medal and the National Space Club Astronautics Engineer Award.

== Personal life ==
Rustan was married to Alexandra Cary Rustan and had two children. He participated in church-sponsored humanitarian projects, including infrastructure and food-security initiatives in rural Honduras.

== Death ==
Rustan died of cancer on June 28, 2012, at his home in Woodbridge, Virginia, at the age of 65.
