= Wallis and Futuna in World War II =

Wallis and Futuna situation during World War II

Wallis and Futuna during the Second World War
- Flag
- Interactive map of Wallis and Futuna during the Second World War
- Capital: Mata Utu; 13°18′S 176°12′W
- Official languages: French
- Common languages: Wallisian Futunan

The Second World War in Wallis and Futuna was a period of significant upheaval for this French protectorate territory in the Pacific.

The islands were not the scene of fighting, but suffered complete isolation for seventeen months, from January 1, 1941 to May 27, 1942. Following France's surrender to Germany on June 22, 1940, Bishop Alexandre Poncet and French Resident Léon Vrignaud chose to remain loyal to the Vichy regime, while all the other French possessions in Oceania (New Hebrides, New Caledonia, French Oceania Establishments) joined the Free France; neighboring islands (Tonga, Western and American Samoa, Tokelau, Gilbert and Ellice Islands) are administered by Allied powers. Supplies ceased and distant French Indochina was unable to provide support. An initial recapture of Wallis and Futuna was ordered by General de Gaulle in February 1941, but was postponed when it became known to the residents. The Japanese advance in the Pacific and the entry into the war of the United States after the attack on Pearl Harbor on December 8, 1941 changed the situation: the Pacific war broke out and Wallis became a strategic point for the Americans against Japan. The capture of Wallis was organized jointly by the Allies.

On May 27, 1942, the island of Wallis was taken over by the Free France and the American army the following day. The United States set up a military base on the island. In all, more than 4,000 American troops were stationed on Wallis, doubling the island's population. Numerous infrastructures were built, including an airfield, roads, a port and a hospital. The Americans also brought with them many material goods and money: Wallisians were discovering consumer society, and traditional religious and customary structures were undermined by these changes. The French authorities were also losing prestige in the face of American power. At first, the Americans had a rather negative view of the Wallisians, although relations improved over time; some women even had the children of American soldiers, much to the dismay of the Catholic mission, which sought to control the morals of the faithful. Futuna, on the other hand, is much more isolated, unoccupied by the Americans and largely unaffected by these changes. The Futunian population relies on subsistence farming to cope with the shortage of basic necessities.

By February 1944, Wallis' strategic importance had waned and the United States began repatriating its troops. By June 1944, only a dozen soldiers remained: the American dream came to an end, leaving Wallisian society in turmoil. An economic crisis began, as the population had to return to work on the plantations. The political authorities were also very weakened, and the following years were marked by great instability. In 1946, an American lieutenant even tried to claim annexation of Wallis by the United States, before the last troops left. During this period, Wallisians and Futunians began to emigrate to New Caledonia, a phenomenon that intensified after the war and led to the establishment of a large community in New Caledonia. The protectorate of Wallis and Futuna became less and less adapted to the new realities of the territory, and after a referendum in 1959, Wallis and Futuna became an overseas territory in 1961.

== Geographical and historical context ==
=== Political, economic and social organization ===
Location of Wallis and Futuna in Oceania.

The islands of Wallis and Futuna (and the neighboring island of Alofi) are located in Central Polynesia, in the Pacific Ocean. They had a population of around 6,775 in the late 1930s, including 2,000 on Futuna. Converted to Catholicism by French Marist missionaries in the 1840s, the islands came under French protection as the protectorate of Wallis and Futuna in 1888. Alongside the French administration (whose presence was limited to a French resident and his chancellor) and the powerful Catholic mission, the islands were governed by customary kings : the Lavelua in Uvea (Wallis), and the Tu'i Sigave and Tu'i Agaifo in the two kingdoms of Futuna. However, from 1934 to 1941, the kingdom of Uvea no longer had a sovereign, and it was the customary prime minister (kalae kivalu) who had the highest role in the Wallisian chiefdom. Futuna is more isolated and independent of French administration.

The local Polynesian inhabitants (who make up the vast majority of the population) live from fishing and subsistence farming in a network of exchanges organized around gifts and counter-gifts, punctuated by major customary ceremonies. Copra exports were the only commercial activity on both islands, but collapsed in the 1930s due to a pest. The European presence was limited to the resident of France and his family, a chancellor, a few merchants and several missionaries.

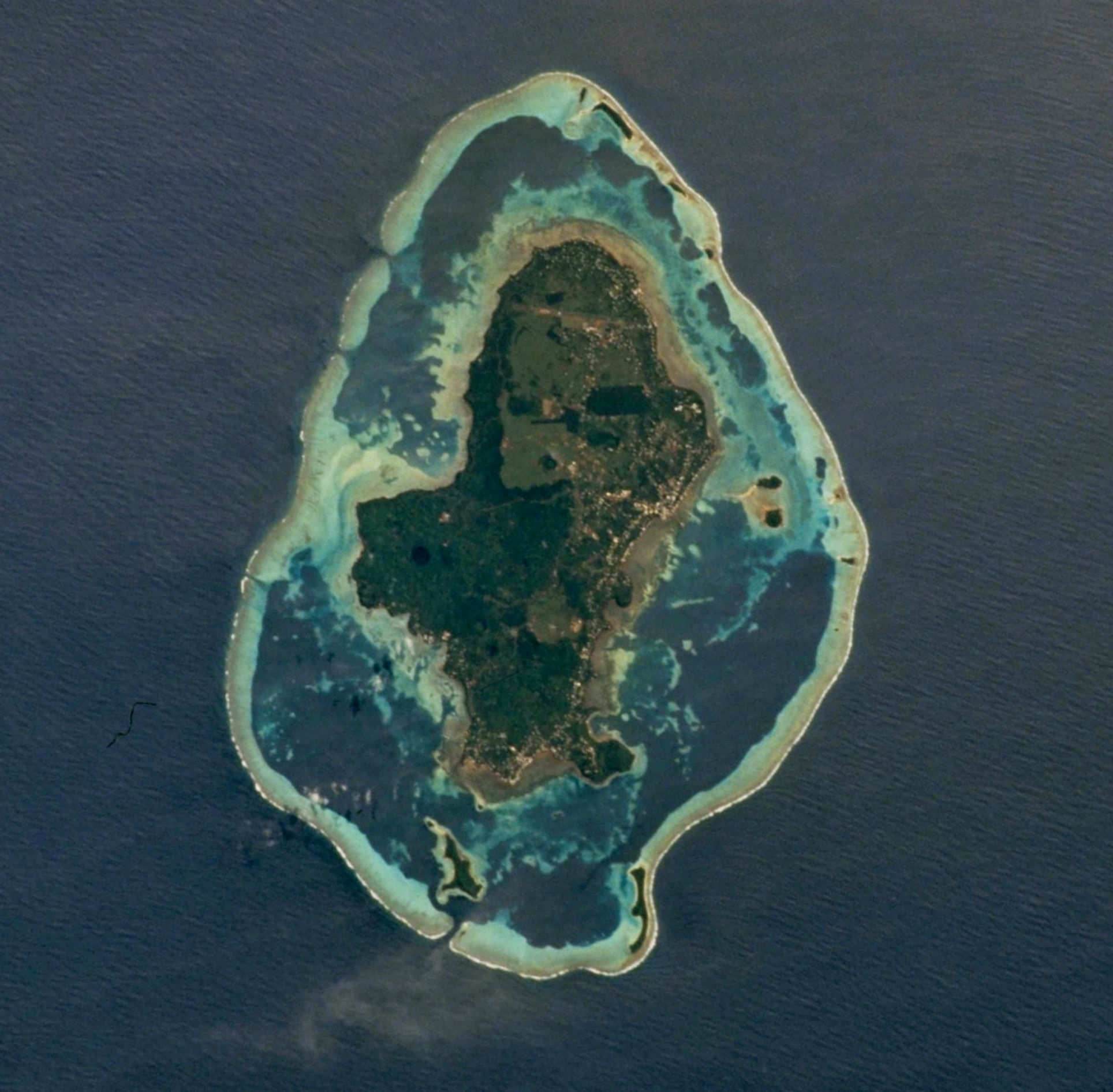
Wallis Island ('Uvea).

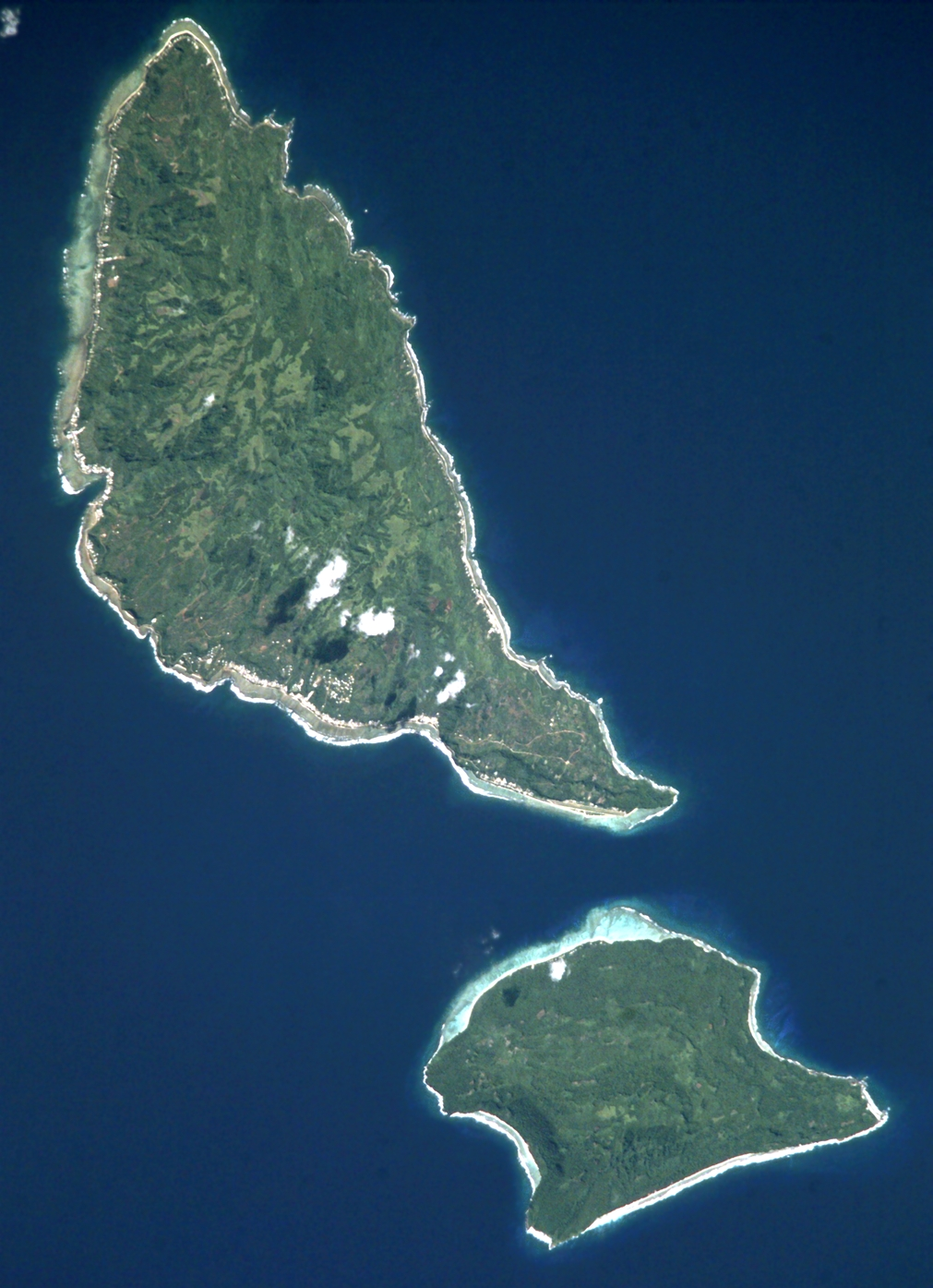
Futuna and Alofi (Horn Islands).

=== Geographical situation ===
The nearest islands are Tonga to the south (British protectorate from 1900 to 1970), Fiji (British colony from 1874 to 1970) to the southwest, and the Ellice Islands and Gilbert Islands (British protectorates from 1892 to the 1970s, now Tuvalu and Kiribati) to the north, Tokelau (British protectorate, included in the Gilbert and Ellice Islands in 1916) to the northeast, and Samoa to the east, divided between German Samoa (1900–1914), which came under New Zealand sovereignty in 1920, and American Samoa (1899–present). The French protectorate was thus surrounded by British and American possessions. The copra trade with Fiji and other British-influenced territories came to an end in the 1930s, and Wallis and Futuna turned more towards New Caledonia. In 1935, the creation of the apostolic vicariate of Wallis and Futuna further isolated the territory from the Anglo-Saxon world and brought it closer to Nouméa.

The closest French possessions are the New Hebrides (a Franco-British condominium from 1907 to 1980) and New Caledonia, a colony conquered in 1853 and made an overseas territory in 1944. The French establishments in Oceania (now French Polynesia), a colony from 1880 to 1946, are even further removed from Wallis and Futuna.

== Wallis and Futuna, the last French Pacific territory loyal to Vichy ==
On September 3, 1939, France and the United Kingdom declared war on Germany, following the invasion of Poland: the start of the Second World War. After several months of "Phoney war", the Battle of France began on May 10, largely to the advantage of the Third Reich. Marshal Pétain became President of the Council on June 16, 1940, and called a halt to the fighting, while on June 18 General de Gaulle called for resistance against the enemy and created Free France from the United Kingdom.

=== Refusal of Free France ===
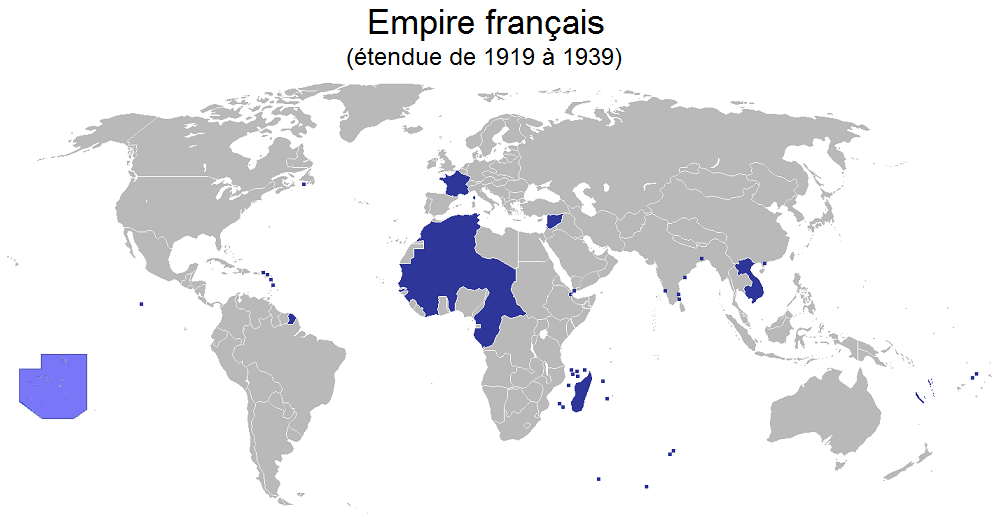
The French colonial empire during the Interwar period (1919–1939).

Following the armistice signed between France and Germany on June 22, 1940, the French territories in the Pacific rallied to General de Gaulle: the New Hebrides on July 20, 1940, the French establishments in Oceania n September 1 and New Caledonia on September 19. Henri Sautot, appointed governor of New Caledonia by de Gaulle, announced in October that Wallis and Futuna would come under his authority, but this was refused by Alexandre Poncet, bishop of Wallis and Futuna. Poncet was an anti-Republican and a staunch Petainist: he categorically refused to join the Free France. This position was shared by other Catholic bishops in the region.

Following the declaration of war in 1939, French resident Lamy left Wallis. His successor, Léon Vrignaud, arrived in Wallis in July 1940 and sought above all to preserve the territory's interests. A former resident of Port-Vila, he had witnessed the rallying of the New Hebrides and initially adopted a wait-and-see attitude. He had to reconcile the opposing positions of the Vichy mission and an influential merchant on the island, a supporter of General de Gaulle. He also wanted to obtain supplies as quickly as possible. Although it is impossible to determine whether he did so out of a concern for good relations with the bishop, or out of conviction, Vrignaud also refused to rally to the Free France. This position was passed on to Henri Sautot in early October 1941.

Historian Jean-Marc Regnault believes that the refusal of the Free France was essentially the work of the few Europeans resident on the island: the bishop, resident Vrignaud and chancellor Alexis Bernast, "without taking into account the opinion or interest of the local population". Regnault explains the bishop's categorical refusal: "For Catholic leaders, the problem of supplies is secondary to ideology. If the islanders lack imported products, they'll go back to farming and fishing". Moreover, a radio message sent from French Indochina on April 16, 1941 congratulated "the French of Wallis for having accepted famine rather than the flour they could easily have obtained from Nouméa if they had rallied to dissent".

While some Wallisian chiefs may have been sympathetic to General de Gaulle, "for the natives, France remained an abstraction, and the London-Vichy quarrels were of no concern to them", writes Regnault. The Wallisians' rallying to the Gaullist cause is therefore, for Regnault, a "legend".

=== Isolation ===
Wallis and Futuna found themselves very isolated: the territory was the last French possession in the Pacific to remain loyal to the Vichy regime. Wallis became cut off from its neighbors (Tonga, Samoa, Fiji), who had joined the Allied camp. Telegraph communications between Futuna and Wallis were also cut off. No more ships landed on the island for 17 months from January 1, 1941, after the last Polynésien ship had passed through on December 27.

The only way to obtain supplies was to call on the French colonies in Asia (French Indochina), thousands of kilometers away; it was only after several months that a telegraph link was established, in March 1941. Bishop Alexandre Poncet then announced to Admiral Jean Decoux Wallis-et-Futuna's loyalty to the Vichy regime. The protectorate's financial situation was "disastrous" and the coffers were almost empty. The resident asked for a subsidy for 1941, which would enable him to buy supplies from the Americans in Samoa. Following repeated requests from Vichy, the Americans finally agreed in principle to this supply, before withdrawing after the Japanese attack on Pearl Harbor, which brought the United States into the war. Supplies of goods, gasoline and oil diminish.

In this context, religious commemorations are being held to mark the 100th anniversary of the death of Pierre Chanel, a missionary who came to evangelize Futuna in the 1840s.

== Rally to Free France and installation of an American base ==
=== First reconquest projects ===
Facing the Japanese advance in the Pacific (orange on the map), Wallis became a strategic location for the American army, which set up a base there in May 1942.

In early 1941, General de Gaulle ordered the reconquest of Wallis, fearing that the island would fall into German hands. The operation was approved by the general on February 22, 1941, but delayed for a year due to a leak of information (resident Vrignaud learned of the landing plans) and various technical problems.

On March 16, 1941, the Wallisian traditional chiefs elected the traditional prime minister (kivalu) Leone Matekitoga as Lavelua (King of Uvea). Because of the war, this information was not passed on to the Allied forces. For historian Jean-Marc Regnault, the re-establishment of customary kingship in Uvea (interrupted since 1934) was decided by the resident and the bishop to unite the Wallisian population around the Vichy regime – although the new king refused to swear an oath to Marshal Pétain.

=== The Pacific War and inter-allied negotiations ===
On December 8, 1941, following Japan's attack on Pearl Harbor, the Pacific War began. The Japanese Empire advanced into Melanesia, occupying parts of New Guinea and the Solomon Islands. To counter the Japanese threat, the Americans set up bases on several Polynesian islands. Wallis took on a sudden strategic importance: its location near Western Samoa (occupied by the United States in May 1942) and Fiji enabled American aircraft to monitor the area and prevent the Japanese from penetrating. The Japanese advance also worried General de Gaulle, who feared the loss of French territories. De Gaulle began talks with the Allies, notably Australia, to organize the defense of France's Pacific possessions. Georges Thierry d'Argenlieu was appointed French High Commissioner to the Pacific.

In February 1942, 5,000 American troops moved to Bora-Bora, and in March the American army set up its South Pacific headquarters in Nouméa.

The American command decided to set up a base in Wallis. Negotiations between the Allies and De Gaulle were difficult: behind the question of recovering the colonies lay the problem of who would administer them, and how, as the French centralized system was very different from Anglo-Saxon indirect rule. De Gaulle insisted that French sovereignty be respected everywhere. For him, it was vital that the Free France took control of Wallis before the American army did. Jean-Marc Regnault points out that "the agreement between the Free France and the American forces is precarious". The British also wanted to wait for the Americans to arrive in New Caledonia before launching an expedition to Wallis. Political divisions within New Caledonia also slowed down the operation: Governor Henri Sautot opposed centralization of power and was sent back to London on May 5, 1942.

In early May 1942, Vice-Admiral Robert L. Ghormley announced to D'Argenlieu that the United States had decided to invest in Wallis. Free France had little time to mount an expedition and join the Allied fleet.

=== Timeline of events ===
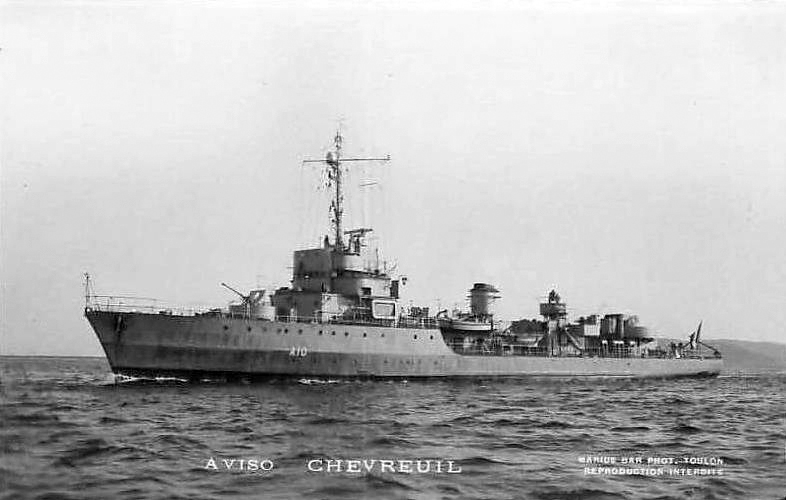
The Chevreuil, a Free France aviso, landed at Mata Utu on May 27, 1942, one day before the Americans, to assert French sovereignty over Wallis.

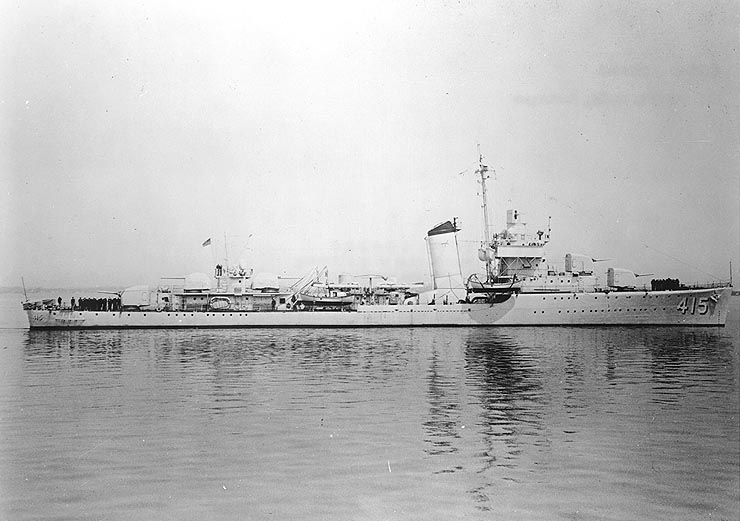
The USS O'Brien accompanied the American troops who landed at Mata Utu on May 28, 1942.

The Americans' initial plan was for their fleet to enter the Wallis lagoon on May 28, led by a Free France ship, the aviso Chevreuil. However, Lieutenant Fourlinnie decided to override the orders and enter a day ahead of schedule, to assert French sovereignty over Wallis and Futuna. The Allied forces did not know whether the Japanese were there, and prepared for possible fighting by landing.

On May 27, 1942, the Free France aviso Chevreuil crossed the Honikulu pass (to the south) and entered the Wallis lagoon. An expeditionary force led by Captain Molina (whose real name was Jean José España) landed on the island. They were welcomed by the resident Léon Vrignaud, who agreed to surrender, and then by Bishop Alexandre Poncet, who considered the event a catastrophe, but assured the new authorities that he would not interfere with their mission. The customary king, Leone Matekitoga, assured the authorities of his loyalty to General de Gaulle, and Captain Molina awarded him the Cross of Lorraine. The rallying to Free France took place without any violence. The radio station is secured and Jean-Baptiste Mattei becomes the new resident of France.

The following day (May 28, 1942), the Americans landed. The American soldiers had waited three weeks at Pago Pago in American Samoa for diplomatic negotiations, then went on to Apia before reaching Wallis on May 25, 1942. The ships USS Swan and USS Summer were chosen for their small size, which enabled them to cross the Honikulu Pass; they were accompanied by the American destroyer O'Brien and the New Zealand ship HMNZS Achilles. The marines were mainly from the 8th Marine Defense Battalion. Wallis receives the code names Strawboard, Atom and Lameduck.

Futuna rallied to Free France two days later, but was not invested by the Allies.

The news was initially kept secret by the Allies. However, to remedy the protectorate's financial problems, Captain Molina sold Wallis-et-Futuna stamps bearing the day's date and the words France libre. The letters sent out spread the news of the capture of Wallis to Vichy, who learned of it on August 18, 1942.

== Wallis in Amelika times (1942–1944) ==
=== The arrival of technological civilization ===
From 1942 to 1944, the American army set up a base in Wallis. The American presence had a profound impact on Wallisian society. (1943 U.S. Navy archive images).

The U.S. Army carries out repairs on the Wallis base in 1943 (archive images).

The American command landed 2,000 GIs on the island, and their numbers averaged 4,000 over the next two years, rising to 6,000 at certain times. In June 1942, military engineers (seabees) arrived on the island. The Americans build numerous infrastructures: an air base at Hihifo for bombers and another at Lavegahau, bulldozed (a machine never seen on the island), a hydrobase at Muʻa Point, a port at Gahi (built with local volcanic stone, wood and sand) and a 70-bed hospital, as well as roads. They transported a significant quantity of armaments, flak, anti-aircraft warfare, tanks, etc. Futuna, on the other hand, was not taken over by the Americans.

The US Army built an airstrip at Hihifo. The US Navy's military engineers begin construction of a 6,000-foot (1,828.8 m) runway for use by Allied heavy bombers. The airfield became operational in October 1942. In the 1960s, it became the Wallis-Hihifo airport. The army also laid out roads on the island, including one through a forest considered sacred to the Wallisians, the vao tapu around Lake Lalolalo.

American Catholic chaplains were present, facilitating the mission's relations with the American army. At the same time, the fear of a Japanese attack persisted: "As soon as the Americans arrived in Wallis, air raids on the island were feared, and even the possibility of an attack by sea could not be ruled out (...) so the danger was obvious", recounts Alexandre Poncet.

=== Upheavals in Wallisian society ===
Mortar training exercises and dynamite destruction of a B-24 bomber damaged by American soldiers in Wallis in 1943.

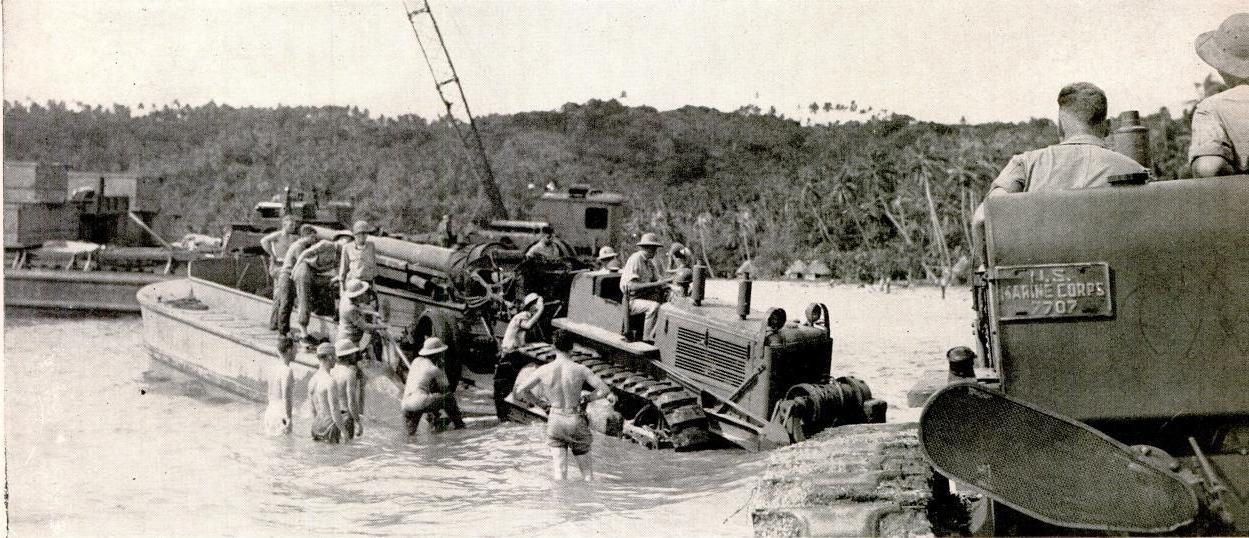
The U.S. Army lands a 155-mm gun in Gahi Bay. Photo published in New York in Life Magazine on August 24, 1942 (location withheld).

This period had a profound impact on Wallisian society. In addition to the extensive infrastructure and equipment provided by the GIs (American soldiers), the latter arrived with considerable purchasing power in dollars, and Wallis was linked by air and sea to the Samoan Islands. As a result, writes historian Frédéric Angleviel, "there was an extraordinary economic boom that was unexpected, brief and short-lived. A veritable consumer frenzy swept the island, despite efforts to regulate residency". The protectorate's tax revenues rose sharply thanks to tariffs on American products. The Americans introduced tinned food, in particular corned beef (called tini pipi in Wallisian). The Wallisians were very fond of it, while the Americans loved the fresh meat obtained from animals living on the island. The Americans introduced wage labor, still unknown on the island: many men were recruited as laborers and over 500 women as laundresses. However, New Zealand historian Judith A. Benett points out that the 250 Wallisian workers employed by the Americans were among the lowest paid in the Pacific, at 20 cents an hour.

In addition to the sudden arrival of consumer society on the island, the presence of the Americans upset the authority of the chieftaincy, the residence and the missionaries. The commoners (tuʻa) rapidly grew rich working for the American army, overturning the social hierarchy dominated by the nobles ('aliki). As a result, the French administration was forced to increase the chiefs' allowances by 1,000% in 1943. An American officer also attended all customary chieftaincy meetings.

The French administration lost prestige in the face of American power, even though the protectorate's revenues rose sharply: between customs taxes, fines, capitation taxes and laundry patents, the budget generated a surplus of 500,000 francs.

The Catholic mission also lost some of its power. While former resident Joseph Vrignaud and his chancellor Alexis Bernast were exiled to Tahiti in June 1942, Bishop Alexandre Poncet remained in office despite his allegiance to the Vichy regime. The Marist Fathers tried to control the morals of the Uvean population, but the fines demanded by the Catholic mission were no longer a deterrent, as they could easily be paid in dollars.

In human terms, the first contacts between Americans and Wallisians led to an influenza epidemic in June 1942, which killed 27 people. Initially, the Americans had a very negative view of the Wallisians, considering them lazy and carriers of contagious diseases (tuberculosis, yaws, leprosy and filariasis). Seventy lepers were quarantined on the islet of Nukuatea, and American doctors examined the entire Wallisian population. Romantic and sexual relationships developed between GIs and Wallisian women. Perceptions differed: the Church complained of loose morals and mole katoliko ("not Catholic") acts, while the Americans found Wallisian women very shy. Several mixed-race children were born of these unions. Cases of prostitution have also been reported. However, friendships were formed between the local population and the soldiers, and relations improved.

=== The end of the American dream ===
After the American victory at Guadalcanal and the conquest of Tarawa, the American presence in Polynesia lost its strategic importance. In February 1944, the dismantling and evacuation of American bases in Samoa and Wallis began. By March, only 300 soldiers remained, and by June 1944, only 12 Americans were left in 'Uvea. The U.S. Army disposes of its equipment and ammunition in several lakes, notably Lake Lalolalo. In April 1946, the last Americans left Wallis. The lavish period of wealth and waste came to an end as abruptly as it had begun. The Wallisians were faced with economic difficulties: food crops had been neglected, coconut plantations had been abandoned for lack of copra exports, and poultry was threatened with extinction. The lagoon has also been damaged by dynamite fishing. The population had to return to agriculture, but "Wallisians have difficulty accepting a return to a quasi-self-sufficient economy".

== Futuna's isolation during the Second World War ==
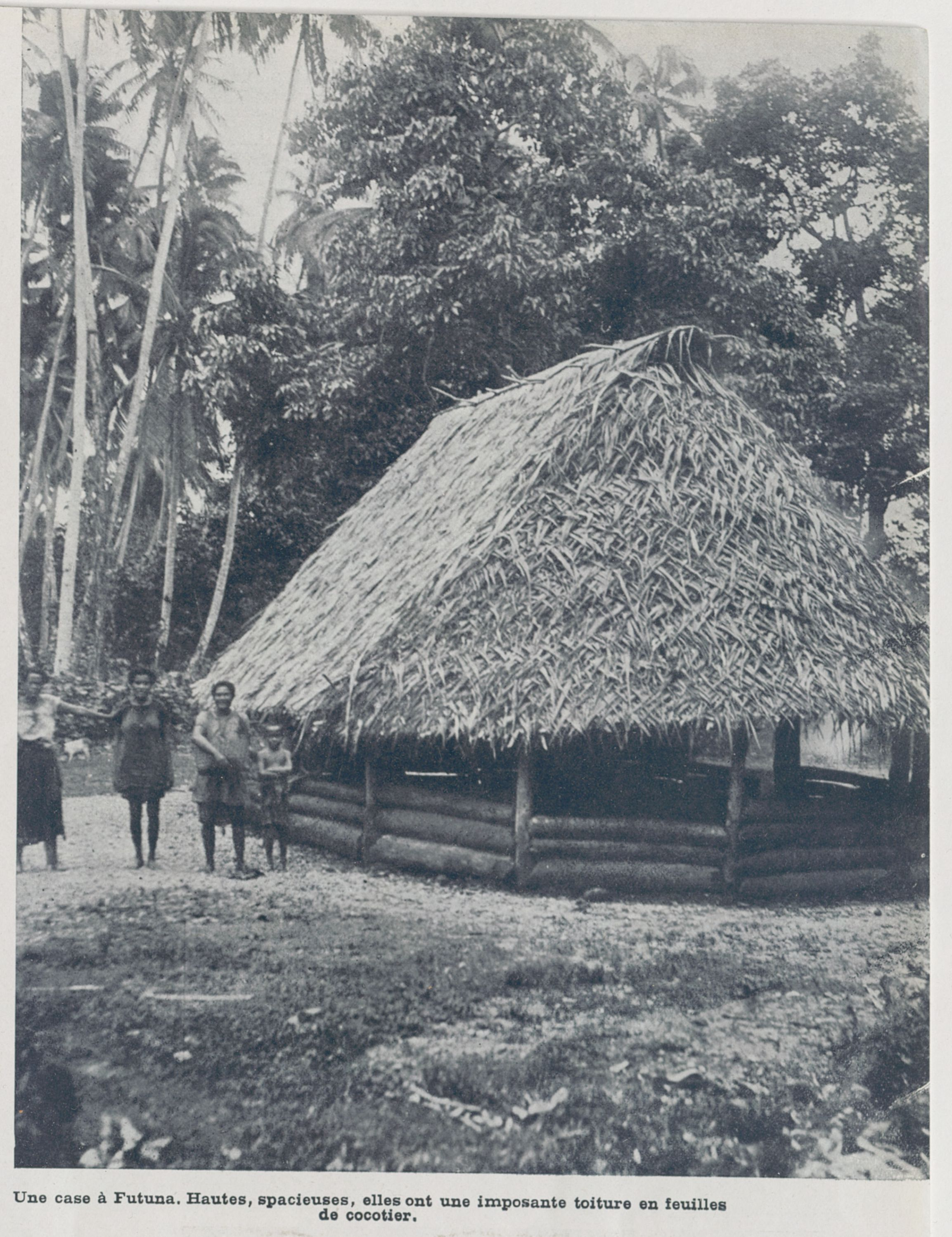
A traditional dwelling in Futuna photographed in 1937.

Futuna, which was already difficult to access in normal times and had no radio station, found itself in an even more delicate situation during the Second World War, as it was totally isolated and cut off from the outside world. For two years, the French administration and the mission in Wallis had no news of Futuna, and the inhabitants, deprived of basic necessities (flour, wheat, oil, cloth, etc.), survived solely on subsistence farming. Resident Jean-Baptiste Mattei, visiting the island in 1943, was struck by the "appalling misery" suffered by the inhabitants.

The arrival of the Americans at the end of May 1942 broke this isolation somewhat, but Futuna was not occupied by the American army and remained very much on the sidelines. Bishop Alexandre Poncet was taken by an American ship to Futuna on November 10, 1942, and left on December 21.

Father O'Reilly writes: "[1945] With no sea link, Futuna, with no flour, no sugar, no medicine and no clothes, is experiencing difficult days. [...] On June 23, 1946, an American submarine passing through Futuna gave the mission, which had been without supplies for 2 years, "a little flour". An anti-submarine seaplane broke Futuna's isolation by taking 45 natives to New Caledonia: they were the first Futunians to enlist outside their native island.

During the war, one of the copra merchants is said to have taken advantage of the situation to swindle the Futunians, exchanging cloth for clothing in exchange for plots of coconut trees. According to Marcel Gaillot, he even traded copra bags for clothes. At the time, Futunian society was not at all monetized. However, in 1945, resident Mattei forced the merchant to return the fraudulently acquired plots. Frédéric Angleviel points out that the Futunians are "well supervised by their two chiefdoms and the mission". Copra production continued, and by the end of the war, the Futunians were selling it at a good price. However, as Burns Philp had run out of supplies and closed its store in 1940, the inhabitants were unable to use the money to buy basic necessities.

Marcel Gaillot points out that Futuna was only finally connected to the outside world in 1968, when an airfield was built at Vele. Until then, food and mail were sent by plane; the only means of communication was by radio. Futuna's isolation continued throughout the 1950s and 1960s. Angleviel describes this situation as "quasi-abandonment".

== Consequences ==
=== Economic, social and political crises ===
The upheavals brought about by the American presence in Wallis had a profound economic, political and social impact. The 1950s were marked by considerable political instability (five customary kings succeeded one another from 1945 to 1959). On March 25, 1946, American Lieutenant Zinchek, who commanded the last twelve American soldiers left on Wallis, brought a petition demanding "the annexation of Wallis to the United States and the departure of the French". Eventually, Zinchek was recalled by the American command, but this crisis had customary repercussions. In April 1947, the Lavelua Leone Matekitoga was deposed. He was succeeded by Pelenato Fuluhea, a native of Mu'a. Three years later, in 1950, a social movement forced him to resign. The French administration also emerged from this period weakened by the demonstration of American power. For historian Frédéric Angleviel, "the balance of power was disturbed".

The departure of the Americans left the Wallisian economy in crisis, and although copra exports resumed in 1948, they declined throughout the 1950s. "Lacking both money and copra, Burns Philp left the archipelago after the war, and was replaced in 1947 by Lavoix de Nouméa. Victor-Emmanuel Brial was put in charge of the comptoir. His brothers Benjamin Brial in Wallis and Cyprien Brial in Futuna replaced him in 1950. In 1950, Ballande establishments, based in New Caledonia, opened a branch in Wallis, the second French trading company to do so. Numerous financial problems arose following the construction of infrastructures after the American occupation, which could not be maintained. The high level of monetization of Wallisian and Futunian companies, as in the other French Pacific possessions, led to the creation of the Pacific franc in 1945 to maintain parity with the dollar, while the French franc had been devalued.

=== Long-term consequences ===
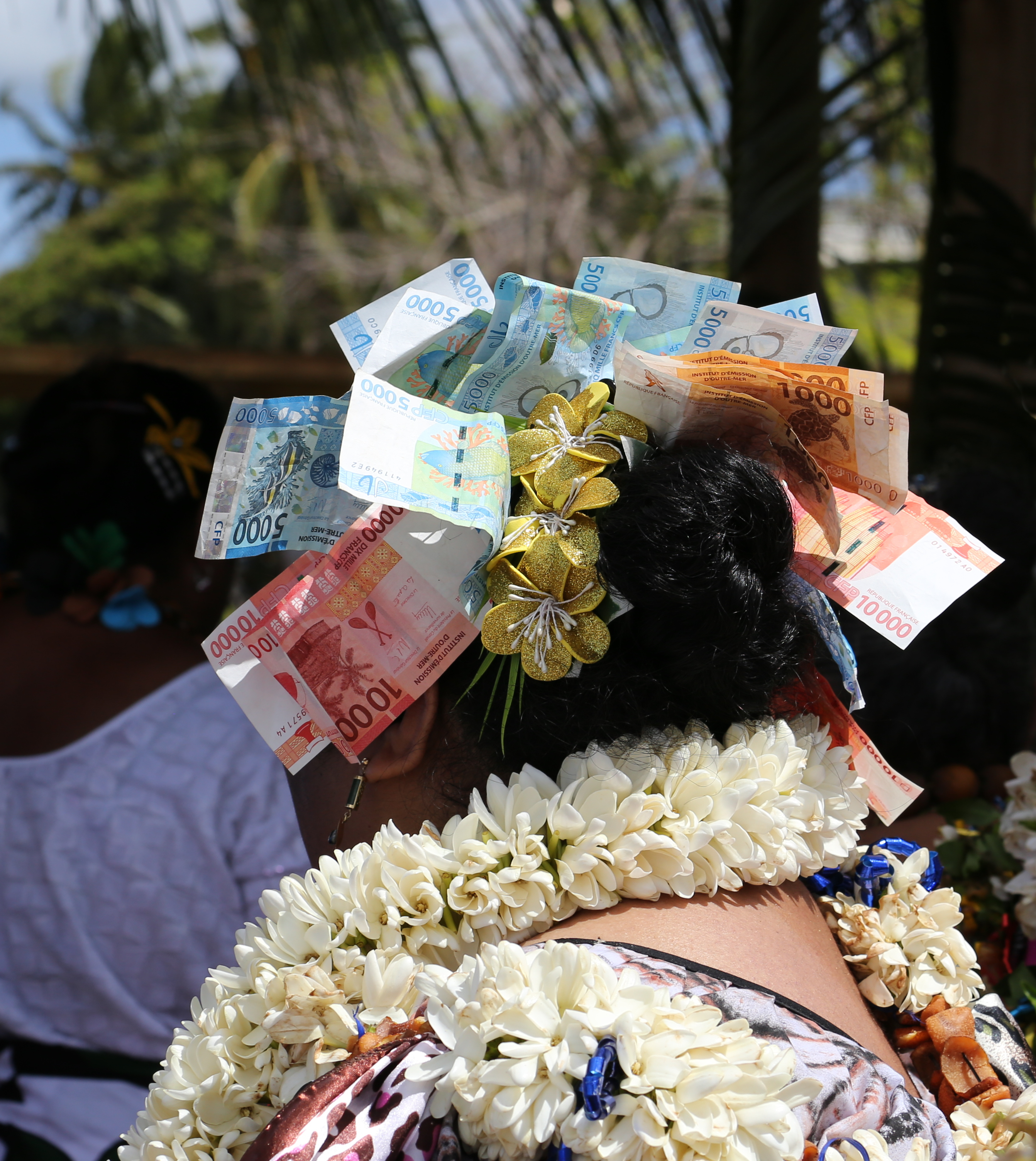
The American presence contributed to the monetarization of Wallisian society, and money became part of the system for circulating goods during traditional ceremonies such as the katoaga (shown here in 2019).

The American presence brought a large influx of dollars to Wallis, and money became part of the goods exchanged as part of a system of give and take that organized Wallisian society. This can be seen in certain customary ceremonies, such as the katoaga, where it becomes customary to slip banknotes into the hair of dancers to reward them.

Some of the infrastructure built by the U.S. military has been preserved, such as the airfield that became the Wallis-Hihifo airport in the late 1950s.

The American presence also left its mark on Wallisian language: many borrowings from English were incorporated into Wallisian, notably words for manufactured products, vehicles and foodstuffs.

=== Emigration to New Caledonia and the end of the protectorate ===
For historian Frédéric Angleviel, this period was above all marked by the discovery of a different way of life (Western consumer society), and favored the emigration of many Wallisians and Futunians seeking to emancipate themselves from their customary obligations. In 1943, the American command wished to send three hundred Wallisian workers to New Caledonia, but as not everyone volunteered, the bishop intervened and in the end 169 men, including 48 Futunians, left for Nouméa. After the war, this emigration continued and grew stronger, leading to the establishment of a large Wallisian and Futunian community in New Caledonia.

As the protectorate of Wallis and Futuna became increasingly "anachronistic", the French authorities began to consider changing its status. Approved by referendum in 1959, the status of Wallis and Futuna was passed on July 29, 1961, transforming the protectorate into an overseas territory.

== Memory and oral tradition ==
=== Chants ===
The memory of the Second World War is perpetuated locally through songs, which play an important role in Wallisian culture. Composed on the occasion of numerous religious and customary festivals, they chronicle current events and celebrate past ones, forming the privileged medium of oral tradition. Some texts recount the American landings of 1942, while others sing of the start of the world conflict, the Provence landings, the liberation of Paris in 1944 or the atomic bombing of Japan. For Raymond Mayer and Malino Nau, "the U.S. Army's communications service did its job perfectly, when you consider the degree of accuracy of the information delivered by the songs' '. While some of these songs about the Second World War were still heard in the 1970s, most of them disappeared with the death of their composers. In Futuna, this memory is more alive, as it is maintained by the practice of tauasu, oratory wakes.

=== Museum ===
In 2006, the Uvea Museum Association, a museum dedicated to the Second World War in Wallis, opened its doors in Mata Utu. An association of American veterans who served on Wallis also exists, with 80 members in 2006.

== Notes and references ==
This article is partly or entirely taken from the article entitled "History of Wallis and Futuna".

=== Bibliography ===
- Regnault, Jean-Marc (2004). La France Libre, Vichy et les Américains : Des relations difficiles dans le Pacifique en guerre. L'exemple des îles Wallis et Futuna (1940–1942). Vol. 91. Outre-mers. pp. 181–200. doi:10.3406/outre.2004.4118.
- Angleviel, Frédéric (2006). Wallis-et-Futuna (1942–1961) ou comment le fait migratoire transforma le protectorat en TOM (in French). Journal de la Société des océanistes. pp. 61–76.
- Soulé, Marc (2008). "Les bouleversements de la société coutumière lors de la présence américaine à Wallis (1942–1946)". Révoltes, conflits et Guerres mondiales en Nouvelle-Calédonie et dans sa région. L'Harmattan. ISBN 9782296051225.

== See also ==
=== Related articles ===
- History of Wallis and Futuna
- Pacific War
- Statism in Shōwa Japan
- Free France
- Military history of the United States during World War II
- Statute of Wallis and Futuna (1961)

=== External links ===
- Interview with American veterans who served in Wallis
