= 2020 in Wallis and Futuna =

- Decades: 2000s; 2010s; 2020s
- See also: Other events of 2020; Timeline of Wallisian history

Events from 2020 in Wallis and Futuna.

== Incumbents ==
- Administrator Superior: Thierry Queffelec
- President of the Territorial Assembly: David Vergé

== Events ==
Ongoing – COVID-19 pandemic in Oceania

- 4 March – The territory turned away a cruise ship over fears of infection; the possibility of denying entry to another ship by the end of the month was also under consideration. Incoming flights have also been curtailed, save for those delivering essential supplies.
- 23 April – The island began repatriating its 300 inhabitants stranded on New Caledonia.
