= Elections in Wallis and Futuna =

In the 1959 Wallis and Futuna status referendum, 94.37% of the voters chose to convert the Protectorate of Wallis and Futuna into a French overseas territory. Wallis and Futuna became an overseas territory in 1961, then a French overseas collectivity in 2003. As such, one person is elected indirectly to the French Senate for a six-year term, while another is elected directly to the National Assembly for five years.

It also elects a unicameral legislature on the territorial level. The Territorial Assembly (Assemblée Territoriale) elects 20 members for five-year terms by proportional representation in multi-seat constituencies. ʻUvea is allocated 13 seats—6 for the Mua District, 4 for the Hahake District, and 3 for the Hihifo District—while Futuna has 7 seats—4 for the Alo District and 3 for Sigave. The electoral system uses a closed list, with voters voting for a single party, with the seats being distributed in each constituency using the highest averages method. The assembly is headed by a president elected every year by its members after the opening of the budgetary session.

== Elections ==
=== 1987 Territorial Assembly election ===
The Rally for the Republic won only seven seats, but formed a coalition with the Local People's Union.

=== 1992 Territorial Assembly election ===
The conservative Gaullist Rally for the Republic won nine seats, the Socialists six, and independents five, but this marked the end of 28 years of rule by right-wing parties, in part due to the rise of labor unions. For the first time, two women were elected.

=== 1997 Territorial Assembly election ===
Elections in four of the five constituencies were later annulled by the French Constitutional Council.

=== 2002 Territorial Assembly election ===
The Rally for the Republic returned to power with a right-wing majority.

=== 2007 Territorial Assembly election ===
The right-wing parties won 12 of the seats, retaining their majority.

=== 2012 Territorial Assembly election ===
For the first time, a socialist, Vetelino Nau, was elected president, as his side won 11 of the 20 seats.

== See also ==
- Electoral calendar
- Electoral system
- 'Uvea mo Futuna (Wallis and Futuna online magazine)
