= Statute of Wallis and Futuna (1961) =

French law cementing the status of an overseas territory

The 1961 Statute of Wallis and Futuna, formally designated as Law No. 61-814 of July 29, 1961, conferred upon the Pacific islands of Wallis and Futuna the status of an overseas territory. This legislative act effectively transformed the protectorate of Wallis and Futuna into an overseas territory of the French Republic. The islands thus became an integral part of the French Republic, while retaining their distinct institutional characteristics. In addition to the French authorities, the traditional authorities, particularly the customary kings of Uvea, Alo, and Sigave, their ministers, and village chiefs, are officially recognized.

== Context ==
=== History ===
Location of Wallis and Futuna in relation to mainland France.

The Wallis and Futuna Islands and the neighboring island of Alofi are situated in the Pacific Ocean, within the Polynesian region. Lapita populations have inhabited these islands since the first millennium BCE, who later evolved into Polynesians. Over time, these populations developed distinct cultures and political organizations, notably structured around customary kingdoms. The political organization of these societies underwent significant changes due to conflicts and external invasions, particularly in Wallis, which was conquered by Tongans who introduced their chiefdom system.

The first contact with Europeans occurred in the 17th and 18th centuries, followed by the arrival of French Marist missionaries in the mid-19th century. The missionaries converted the local populations to Catholicism and imposed a missionary theocracy. To consolidate their power, they worked to formalize the prerogatives of customary power, freezing existing political structures. This led to the formal structuring of the two kingdoms of Futuna (Alo and Sigave). At the same time, contacts with other Polynesian archipelagos were restricted to prevent external influences. Father Pierre Bataillon authored Wallis's first written code of laws (Tohi Fono o Uvea), adopted on June 20, 1870. The Marists sought to end power struggles among chiefs and stabilize the political situation while strictly controlling the population's moral conduct.

=== Protectorate (1888–1961) ===
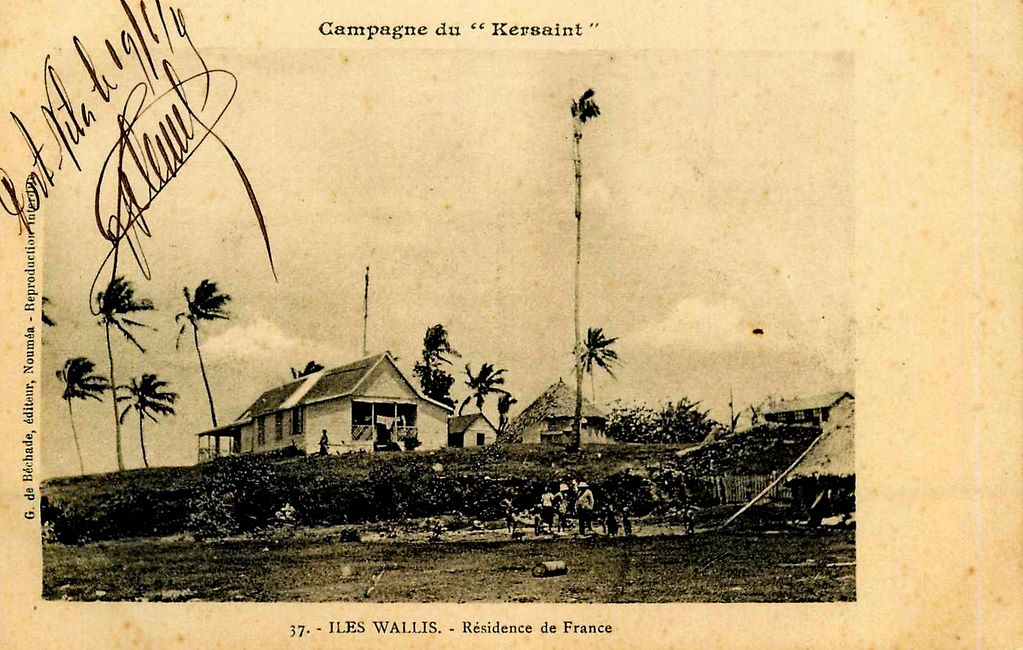
The Residence de France, built in 1904 in Wallis, housed the residents during the protectorate of Wallis and Futuna.

In 1887 and 1888, under the influence of missionaries, the three customary kings petitioned for annexation by France, thereby inaugurating the protectorate of Wallis and Futuna. A tripartite power system emerged, comprising customary authorities, the clergy, and the French administration. However, Wallis and Futuna were not colonized in the conventional sense, as the French presence was limited to a resident (handling external affairs), a chancellor, and a radio operator—all based in Wallis. Futuna, mountainous and lagoon-less, remained more isolated and retained greater independence.

Establishing an American military base in Wallis from 1942 to 1944 resulted in significant cultural and economic upheaval. The Americans constructed substantial infrastructure, introduced consumerism to the local population, and provided considerable purchasing power, thereby undermining the customary chiefs’ authority. Following the departure of the Americans, an economic crisis ensued, political instability grew (with three kings succeeding one another in Wallis between 1945 and 1950), and the population increased. As a result, thousands of Wallisians and Futunians migrated to New Caledonia in search of new opportunities. However, these migrations were often impeded by the fact that they were inhabitants of a French-protected territory, which lacked the advantages of sovereign statehood or the facilities of a French Union territory. In light of this, the French authorities began contemplating a change in the territory's status.

=== Preparation of the statute, referendum (1959), and adoption ===
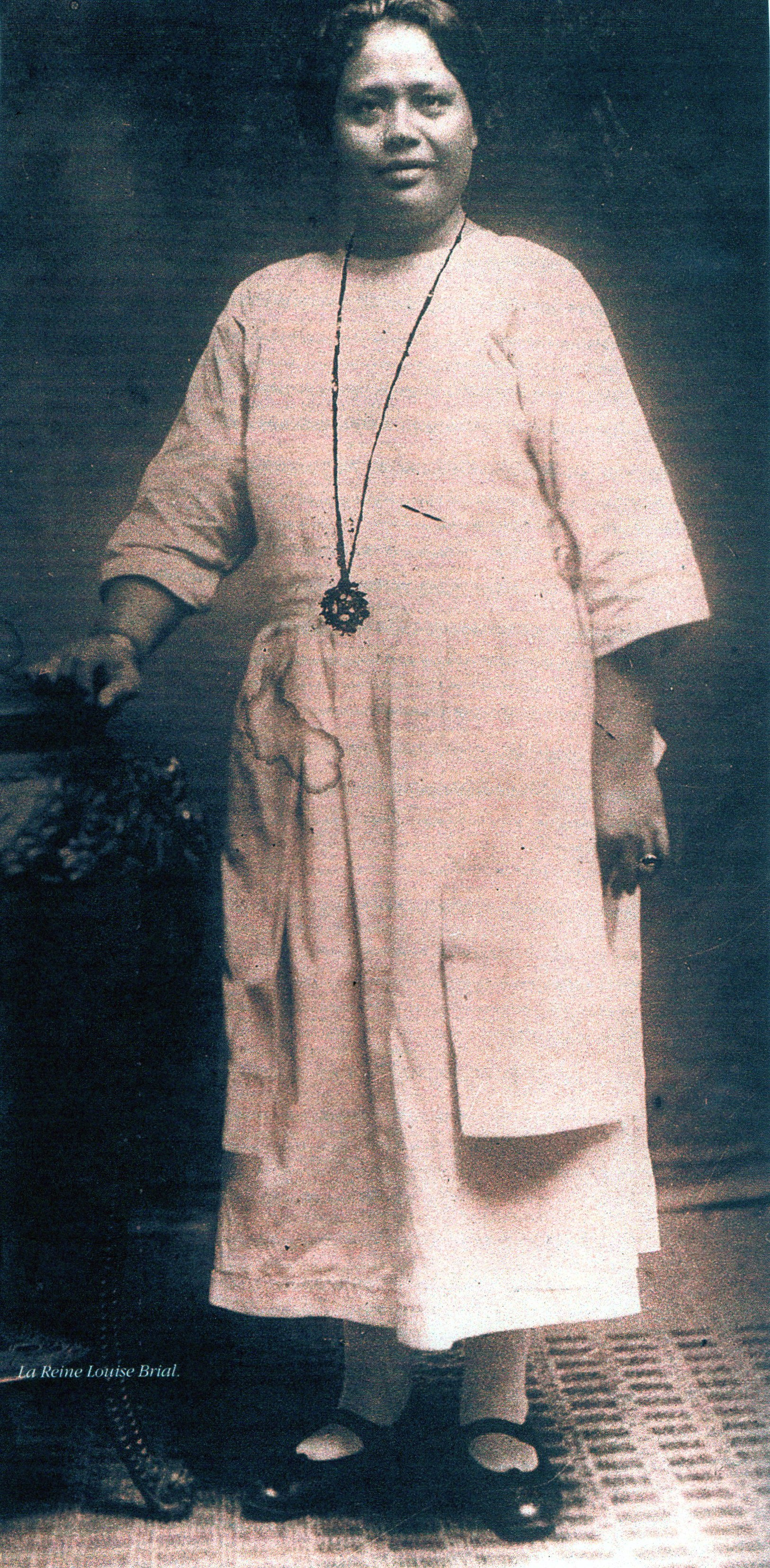
Aloisia Brial, Queen of Wallis from 1953 to 1958.

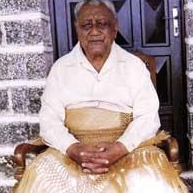
Tomasi Kulimoetoke, King of Wallis from 1959 to 2007.

In 1951, a proposal was put forth that Wallis and Futuna should be granted the status of draft union within the French Union. The resident administrator and Bishop Alexandre Poncet proposed that a customary constitution be drafted as a preliminary measure. Lavelua Kapeliele Tufele III proposed the revival of the 1870 Wallisian constitution, written by Bishop Pierre Bataillon, and emphasized Christianity. However, the administration rejected this proposal. In 1953, New Caledonian senator Henri Lafleur proposed integrating Wallis and Futuna as a district under New Caledonia. According to historian Jean-Claude Roux, the objective was to strengthen loyalist votes in New Caledonia against the autonomist Caledonian Union party. However, the French Senate rejected the proposal due to strong opposition from the Union Calédonienne and its lobbying efforts in Paris.

Concurrently, Queen Aloisia Brial encountered mounting opposition in Wallis, culminating in a customary crisis in 1957. Her prime minister, Tomasi Kulimoetoke, resigned, 14 out of 20 villages defied her authority, and the royal council marginalized her. Ultimately, Queen Aloisia Brial abdicated on September 12, 1958. Six months later, on March 12, 1959, Tomasi Kulimoetoke was designated by the royal families as the new sovereign.

In a joint initiative spearheaded by Resident Fauché and Futuna delegate Camille Gloannec, the three customary kings formally petitioned French president Charles de Gaulle on June 27, 1959, to transform the protectorate into an overseas territory. In October 1959, Bishop Alexandre Poncet drafted an initial bill that proposed the incorporation of the clergy into government institutions and the subordination of the chiefs to the authority of the territorial administration. These stipulations were subsequently removed during further negotiations. Through tripartite negotiations among the chiefs, the clergy, and the administration, an agreement was reached that preserved customary law in civil matters, land management under the chiefs' authority, and education under Catholic clergy oversight. The agreement was formally adopted by France's minister for overseas territories, Jacques Soustelle, on October 5, 1959. The decree was finalized in Paris and delivered by plane on December 9, with a referendum scheduled for December 27, just two weeks later, to validate the change in status.

On December 27, 1959, the population of Wallis and Futuna voted in favor of the change in status by an overwhelming majority, with over 94% of votes cast in favor of the proposal. In Wallis, where the population, following the guidance of the mission and the chiefs, unanimously voted in favor of the proposal, 100% of votes were cast in favor of the change in status.

In the wake of the referendum outcomes, a provisional assembly was constituted on February 17, 1960, encompassing the political, customary, and religious authorities of the three islands. In May 1961, the assembly submitted a bill to the legislative commission for consideration. The bill was subjected to debate in the French National Assembly on July 11 and subsequently ratified by the French Parliament on July 29, 1961, during the first legislative session of the Fifth Republic.

== Statute ==
The 1961 statute granted Wallis and Futuna a distinctive political organization. As posited by anthropologist Sophie Chave-Dartoen, the institutional configuration established in 1961 for Wallis and Futuna constituted these archipelagos as a territory with intricate relations with the state and administration. The islanders, however, possess the capacity to navigate these complexities.

== Evolution ==
The 1961 law was initially drafted in a deliberately vague manner to allow for legislative evolution, with the intention that administrative powers would gradually expand over time. The underlying concept was to gradually transfer responsibilities from vaguely defined customary authorities to a territorial assembly with reinforced mandates and powers. Customary practices and authorities were anticipated to become part of local folklore, supplanted by a legitimate administrative and political apparatus. However, this evolution never materialized, and the statute remained largely unchanged. For Wallisian and Futunian society, this statute reinforced customary institutions and "fully guaranteed the 'traditional' foundations of society and its autonomy from the state."
