= Jeanjean =

Jeanjean may refer to:

- Red French wine variety Bouchalès

== People with the surname ==
- Anthony Jeanjean (born 1998), French BMX cyclist
- Léolia Jeanjean (born 1995), French tennis player
- Michel Jeanjean, Administrator Superior of Wallis and Futuna
- Nicolas Jeanjean (born 1981), French rugby union footballer
- Paul Jeanjean (1874–1928), French clarinet composer
- Thomas Jeanjean (born 1973), accounting professor
- Maurice Jeanjean, French musician, composer (1897–1968)
- Faustin Jeanjean, French musician, composer (1900–1979)
