= 1959 Wallis and Futuna status referendum =

Referendum to become an overseas territory

- 27 December 1959
- Do you want the Wallis and Futuna Islands to become an integral part of the French Republic as an overseas territory?

Results
Choice	Votes	%
Yes	4,307	94.37%
No	257	5.63%
Valid votes	4,564	99.74%
Invalid or blank votes	12	0.26%
Total votes	4,576	100.00%
Registered voters/turnout	4,695	97.47%

A referendum on becoming an overseas territory was held in Wallis and Futuna on 27 December 1959. The proposal was approved by 94.37% of voters. Every voter on Wallis voted in favour, whilst all but three of the votes against the proposal were cast in the Futuna Islands. (There were expatriates who voted while in New Caledonia and the New Hebrides.)

The islands were and have continued to be part of France. At the time, they were a French protectorate. A year and a half after the referendum — on 29 July 1961, the islands officially became an overseas territory. They have since changed status again, becoming an overseas collectivity in 2003.

== Results ==
Do you want the Wallis and Futuna Islands to become an integral part of the French Republic as an overseas territory?

(Original: Désirez-vous que les îles Wallis et Futuna fassent partie intégrante de la République française sous la forme d'un territoire d'outre-mer ?)

Choice	Votes	%
For	4,307	94.37
Against	257	5.63
Invalid/blank votes	12	–
Total	4,576	100
Registered voters/turnout	4,695	97.47
Source: Direct Democracy
