= Marcel Renouf =

French civil servant and former defence official

Administrator Superior of Wallis and Futuna
- In office 19 January 2015 – 1 February 2017
- Preceded by: Michel Aubouin
- Succeeded by: Jean-Francis Treffel

Personal details
- Born: 28 October 1953 (age 72) Fermanville, Normandy, France
- Occupation: Civil servant

Marcel Renouf (born 28 October 1953) is a French civil servant and former defence official. From 19 January 2015 to 2 February 2017 he served as the Administrator Superior of Wallis and Futuna.

== Career ==
Renouf has served in various military and administrative roles such as Deputy Prefect for Security and Defence to the Prefect of the Brittany region and Detached civil administrator, head of the subdivision of the Windward Islands.

== Honours ==
Renouf is a recipient of the National Order of Merit and the Ordre du Mérite Maritime.
