= Hervé Jonathan =

Administrator Superior of Wallis and Futuna

Administrator Superior of Wallis and Futuna
- Incumbent
- Assumed office 25 November 2020
- Preceded by: Thierry Queffelec

Personal details
- Born: 6 May 1961 (age 65) Marseille

Hervé Jean Albert Jonathan (born 6 May 1961) is a senior French civil servant. He has previously served as sub-prefect of Bayonne. Since November 2020 he has served as Administrator Superior of Wallis and Futuna.

Jonathan is from Marseille. He was educated at HEC Paris and the IEP and has a Masters in Law. In July 1990 he was admitted to the competition for the exceptional recruitment of sub-prefects. After completing his training he began his first important position in the public service as director of the cabinet of the prefect of Eure-et-Loir.

In April 1994 he was appointed sub-prefect of Rochechouart. In October 1994 he was appointed non-executive sub-prefect to the Minister of Business and Economic Development, in charge of SMEs., trade and crafts. In July 1995 he was appointed secretary-general of the Hautes-Alpes prefecture. In August 2000 he was appointed secretary-general of the prefecture of Charente. In July 2007 he was appointed Deputy Director in the Prime Minister's office to exercise the functions of secretary general of the interministerial delegation for territorial development and competitiveness. In February 2015 he was appointed secretary-general of the prefecture of Loiret. In February 2018, he became sub-prefect of Bayonne.

On 25 November 2020 he was appointed Administrator Superior of Wallis and Futuna. He was welcomed by lavelua Patalione Kanimoa on 10 January 2021, and formally took office on 11 January. He oversaw the response to the COVID-19 pandemic in Wallis and Futuna.
