= Philippe Paolantoni =

French civil servant and administrator

Administrator Superior of Wallis and Futuna
- In office 8 September 2008 – June 2010
- Preceded by: Richard Didier
- Succeeded by: Michel Jeanjean

Personal details
- Born: 1952 (age 72–73)

Philippe Paolantoni (born 1952) is a French civil servant and administrator. Paolantoni was appointed the French Administrator Superior of Wallis and Futuna on Monday 28 July 2008, succeeding his predecessor Richard Didier. He officially took office in Wallis and Futuna on 8 September 2008.

Paolantoni served as the Vice-Prefect of the city of Brest, France, in the region of Brittany, for the three years prior to being named the Administrator Superior of Wallis and Futuna.

== See also ==
- Politics of Wallis and Futuna

Political offices
Preceded by Richard Didier	Administrator Superior of Wallis and Futuna; September 8, 2008–present	Incumbent
