= Richard Didier =

French senior civil servant

High Commissioner of the Republic in French Polynesia
- In office 23 December 2010 – 1 August 2012
- Preceded by: Adolphe Colrat
- Succeeded by: Jean-Pierre Laflaquière

Prefect of Haute-Loire
- In office 28 July 2008 – 23 December 2010
- Preceded by: Christophe Mirmand
- Succeeded by: Denis Conus

Administrator Superior of Wallis and Futuna
- In office 20 July 2006 – 28 July 2008
- Preceded by: Xavier de Fürst
- Succeeded by: Philippe Paolantoni

Personal details
- Born: 23 February 1961 (age 65) Chatou, Yvelines, France
- Education: École nationale d'administration; University of Paris

Richard Didier (born 23 February 1961 in Chatou, France) is a French senior civil servant.

Didier served as the Administrator Superior of Wallis and Futuna for two years, from 2006 to 2008. Didier's time was marked with tensions and succession struggles between several of Wallis and Futuna's royal families and clans following the death of Tomasi Kulimoetoke II in 2007. Didier left Wallis and Futuna for metropolitan France in 2008. He was succeeded as Administrator Superior of Wallis and Futuna by Philippe Paolantoni.

Didier was appointed the Prefect of the Haute-Loire (Upper Loire) department by the French Cabinet at a meeting on 28 July 2008.

He was Prefect without assignment before taking up office as High Commissioner of the Republic in French Polynesia in December 2010.

== Honours and decorations ==
=== National honours ===
Ribbon bar	Honour
	Knight of the National Order of Merit

=== Ministerial honours ===
Ribbon bar	Honour
	Knight of the Order of Academic Palms

=== Civilian medals ===
Ribbon bar	Honour
	Medal of youth and sports
