= Resident of Wallis and Futuna =

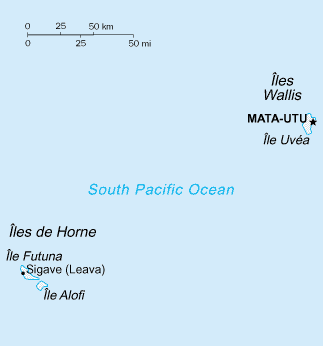
A CIA WFB map of Wallis Island and Hoorn Islands (Futuna and Alofi).

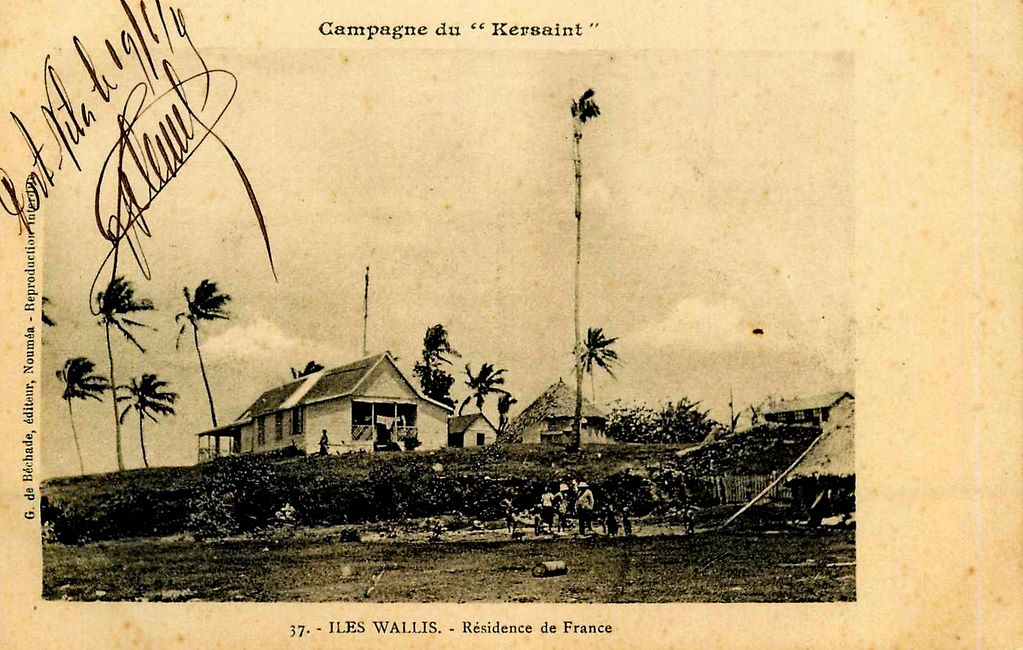
Buildings of the French Residence on Wallis Island (pictured between 1904 and 1909).

The Resident of Wallis and Futuna was the French colonial representative in Wallis and Futuna.

The post was created in 1887, after Wallis and Futuna become a French protectorate. It was abolished in 1961, after the status was changed to that of an overseas territory.

For French representatives in Wallis and Futuna since 1961, see: Administrator Superior of Wallis and Futuna.

== List of residents (1887–1961) ==
Term	Incumbent	Notes
7 April 1887 to 1 March 1892	Antoine Marius Chauvot	Also served as Representative (chargé de mission) to 26 June 1888
1 March 1892 to 6 February 1893	Henri Valentin, comte Dodun de Kéroman	1st time
6 February 1893 to 1895	Marius Valzi	Interim
1895 to 1896	Henri Valentin, comte Dodun de Kéroman	2nd time
16 February 1896 to 1897	Henri Dominique Lefebvre de Sainte-Marie	
20 October 1897 to 27 May 1898	Jacques Émile Proche	
27 May 1898 to 1902	Étienne Joseph Ponge	
20 November 1902 to April 1904	Jean Marie Édouard Chaffaud	
1 December 1905 to 31 August 1909	Maxime Viala	
31 August 1909 to 1 December 1910	Victor Jean Brochard	1st time
31 March 1911 to 26 March 1912	Louis Bouge	Interim
April 1912 to January 1914	Victor Jean Brochard	2nd time
January 1914	Jacques Joubert	Interim
20 January 1914 to June 1916	Édouard Victor Magnien	
20 January 1914 to March 1914	Georges Mallet	Acting for Magnien
June 1916 to December 1921	Georges Mallet	
29 December 1921 to 22 August 1924	Gaston Marius Bécu	Interim to 15 April 1922
12 November 1924 to 29 March 1928	Georges Charles Paul Barbier	
25 May 1928 to 25 May 1931	Jean Marchat	
27 May 1931 to 7 June 1933	Georges Jean Louis Renaud	
7 June 1933 to 16 September 1933	Alexis Bernast	Interim
16 September 1933 to 4 February 1938	Joseph Jean David	
4 February 1938 to 4 July 1940	Eugène Auguste Lamy	
4 July 1940 to 27 May 1942	Léon Émile Marie Prosper Jacques Vrignaud	From October 1940, subordinated himself to Jean Decoux, Vichy French Governor-General of French Indochina, instead to Henri Sautot, Free French Governor of New Caledonia
27 May 1942 to 7 December 1944	Jean-Baptiste Mattei	
7 December 1944 to 21 October 1946	Robert Maxime Charbonnier	
22 October 1946 to 26 January 1947	Pierre Robert Jean Marie Fargis	
27 January 1947 to 31 December 1948	Marcel Alexandre Étienne Chomet	
1 January 1949 to 25 September 1951	Michel Cresson	
26 September 1951 to 11 July 1953	Jean-Flavien Folie, dit Desjardins	
12 July 1953 to 24 January 1955	Charles Claude Séraphin André	
24 January 1955 to 4 November 1956	Bernard François Joseph Heintz	
4 November 1956 to 2 August 1958	Maurice Antoine Rougetet	
3 August 1958 to 9 July 1961	Pierre Fauché	
10 July 1961 to 7 October 1961	Jacques Emmanuel Victor Herry	

== See also ==
- Politics of Wallis and Futuna
- Customary kingdoms of Wallis and Futuna
  - Customary kings of Wallis and Futuna
    - List of kings of Alo
    - List of kings of Sigave
    - List of kings of Uvea
