= Administrator Superior of Wallis and Futuna =

Representative of the French State in the overseas collectivity of Wallis and Futuna

The Administrator Superior of Wallis and Futuna (French: Administrateur supérieur de Wallis-et-Futuna) is the representative of the French State in the collectivity of Wallis and Futuna in the Pacific, with the rank of prefect. The current Administrator Superior is Hervé Jonathan, since 11 January 2021.

The post was created in 1961, after Wallis and Futuna became a French overseas territory. In 2003, the status was changed to that of an overseas collectivity.

== List of administrators superior (1961–present) ==
Term	Incumbent	Notes
7 October 1961 to 21 March 1962	Jean Perie	
21 March 1962 to 13 August 1962	Jacques Herry	Interim
13 August 1962 to 28 January 1964	Jean-Marie Bertrand	
11 March 1964 to 20 April 1966	André Duc-Dufayard	
20 April 1966 to 19 July 1968	Fernand Lamodière	Acting to 26 July 1966
30 July 1968 to 25 March 1971	Jacques Bach	
25 March 1971 to 26 August 1972	Guy Boileau	
19 October 1972 to 25 November 1974	Jacques De Agostini	
22 March 1975 to 29 October 1976	Yves Arbellot-Repaire	
6 November 1976 to 2 May 1979	Henri Beaux	
11 July 1979 to 24 December 1980	Pierre Isaac	
31 December 1980 to 17 December 1983	Robert Thil	
25 January 1984 to 11 April 1985	Michel Kuhnmunch	
3 December 1985 to 17 April 1986	Bernard Lesterlin	
15 July 1986 to 13 September 1987	Jacques Le Hénaff	
17 November 1987 to 1 September 1988	Gérard Lambotte	
6 September 1988 to 30 August 1990	Roger Dumec	
25 October 1990 to 5 February 1993	Robert Pommies	
15 March 1993 to 26 July 1994	Philippe Legrix	
7 August 1994 to 20 February 1996	Léon Legrand	
27 February 1996 to 19 November 1998	Claude Pierret	
23 November 1998 to 25 May 2000	Christian Dors	
26 July 2000 to 3 September 2002	Alain Waquet	
17 September 2002 to 18 January 2005	Christian Job	
18 January 2005 to August 2006	Xavier de Fürst	
14 August 2006 to August 2008	Richard Didier	
8 September 2008 to 28 June 2010	Philippe Paolantoni	
12 July 2010 to 30 March 2013	Michel Jeanjean	
30 March 2013 to January 2015	Michel Aubouin	
19 January 2015 to 1 February 2017	Marcel Renouf	
1 February 2017 to December 2018	Jean-Francis Treffel	
10 January 2019 to 25 November 2020	Thierry Queffelec	
11 January 2021 to present	Hervé Jonathan	

== See also ==
- Politics of Wallis and Futuna
- Customary kingdoms of Wallis and Futuna
  - Customary kings of Wallis and Futuna
    - List of kings of Alo
    - List of kings of Sigave
    - List of kings of Uvea
