= Thierry Queffelec =

Prefect of French Guiana

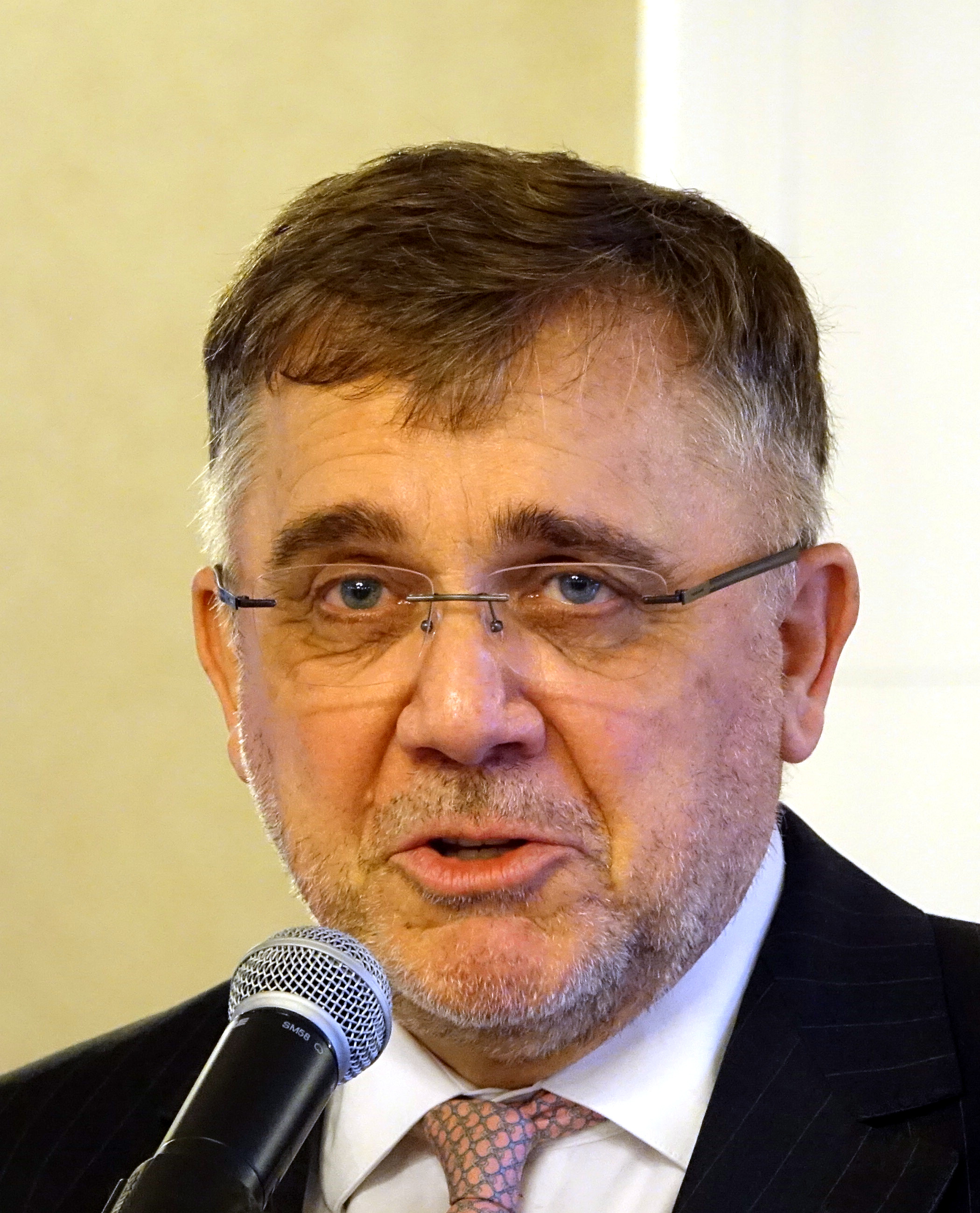

Prefect of French Guiana
- In office 25 November 2020 – 21 August 2023
- Preceded by: Marc Del Grande
- Succeeded by: Antoine Poussier

Administrator Superior of Wallis and Futuna
- In office 7 January 2019 – 25 November 2020
- Preceded by: Jean-Francis Treffel
- Succeeded by: Hervé Jonathan

Personal details
- Born: 27 August 1962 (age 63) Thionville, Moselle, France

Thierry Queffelec (born 27 August 1962) is a French senior civil servant, former Administrator of Wallis and Futuna, and former Prefect of French Guiana.

== Biography ==
Thierry Queffelec was born on 27 August 1962 in Thionville, France. He graduated from the Special Military School of Saint-Cyr.

In 1989, Queffelec was stationed with the United Nations Interim Force in South Lebanon, He also served in Rwanda in 1994, and in Beirut in 1997.

In 1998, Queffelec started to work for the Ministry of the Interior as Chief of Staff of the Vendée Prefecture. In 2005, he was appointed Secretary General of the Paris Prefecture.

On 7 January 2019, Queffelec was appointed Administrator Superior of Wallis and Futuna. and served in that capacity until 25 November 2020, when he was appointed Prefect of French Guiana.
