= Michel Jeanjean =

Administrator Superior of Wallis and Futuna
- In office June 2010 – March 2013
- Preceded by: Philippe Paolantoni
- Succeeded by: Michel Aubouin

Michel Jeanjean was the Administrator Superior of Wallis and Futuna.

A public lawyer by training, Jeanjean began his career in government administration during the 1970s. He has held many domestic French administrative posts including as sub-prefect of Torcy, chief of staff of Meurthe-et-Moselle prefecture (in 1987), and Deputy Warden of Corte (1988). His overseas administrative career has included time as Chief of Staff to the French Commission in Saint Pierre and Miquelon, administrative chief of the Marquesas, and as secretary-general of French Polynesia within the French Overseas Ministry. He was appointed Administrator Superior of Wallis and Futuna in June 2010 and replaced in March 2013.

Michel Jeanjean is chevalier de la Légion d'Honneur.
