= Thomas Jeanjean =

French accounting academic

- Born: 13 December 1973
- Education: Paris Dauphine University, École normale supérieure (Paris), Bocconi University
- Occupation: Academic

Thomas Jeanjean (born 1973) is a French accounting academic. Former president of the French Accounting Association. Thomas Jeanjean was the dean for executive education at ESSEC Business School. As of 2021, he is the Chief Education Officer at the Paris Île-de-France Regional Chamber of Commerce and Industry.

== Career ==
Thomas Jeanjean is the Dean & Executive President of ESCP. He previously held the position of Chief Education Officer at the Paris Île-de-France Regional Chamber of Commerce and Industry. He was a professor of accounting at the ESSEC Business School. and the Dean of ESSEC Executive Education at ESSEC Business School. He was a professor at the HEC Paris and at the École normale supérieure de Cachan. Primarily known for his published research in earnings management, corporate governance, international accounting and accounting history, he has also served on the editorial boards of a number of accounting journals, in particular the Spanish Journal of Finance and Accounting, Accounting in Europe, Accounting and Business Research, Issues in Accounting Education, China Journal of Accounting Research, Comptabilité-Contrôle-Audit and The International Journal of Accounting.

== Education ==
- 2008 International Teachers Programme - SDA Bocconi - Italy
- 2002 PhD. in Financial Accounting - University Paris Dauphine - France
- 1997 Agrégation d'économie et gestion (National competitive exam to get a teaching qualification in financial accounting and corporate finance, Rank: 2nd)
- 1996 Ecole Normale Supérieure de Cachan - France
- 1996 Magistère de Sciences de Gestion (Graduate Diploma in Management) - University Paris Dauphine - France

== Selected publications ==
- Ding, Y., Hope, O., Jeanjean, T., & Stolowy, H. (2007). Differences between Domestic Accounting Standards and IAS: Measurement, Determinants and Implications. Journal of Accounting and Public Policy, pg. 1-28.
- Jeanjean, Thomas., Ramirez, Carlos. (2008). Aux Sources des Théories Positives : Contribution à une Analyse des Changements de Paradigme dans la Recherche en Comptabilité. Comptabilité-Contrôle-Audit, 14(2), 1-22.
- Jeanjean, T., Stolowy, H. (2008). Do Accounting Standards Matter? An Exploratory Analysis of Earnings Management before and after IFRS Adoption. Journal of Accounting and Public Policy, 27(6):480-494.
- Jeanjean, T., & Stolowy, H. (2009). Determinants of Board Members’ Financial Expertise – Empirical Evidence from France. The International Journal of Accounting, 378-402.
