= Alexandre Poncet =

Alexandre Poncet (1884—18 September 1973) was a French clergyman who served as the bishop of the apostolic vicariate of Wallis et Futuna from 1936 to 1961, and was a member of the Society of Mary. He was ordained as a priest in 1909, and worked as a nurse during World War I. Prior to his arrival on Wallis and Futuna he worked in the United Kingdom in London and Paignton. Decades after his death his writings about World War I were published.

== Early life ==
Alexandre Poncet was born in Saint-Chamond, Loire, French Third Republic, in 1884.

== Career ==
Poncet was ordained as a priest in the Society of Mary on 4 July 1909. He was assigned to the parish of London in 1910, and served there until 1920, with the exception of the three years he spent as a nurse during World War I. He wrote a notebook about his activities in World War I while in Futuna and it was published in 2011. He taught in Paignton for five years.

Poncet became a missionary in 1925. He was appointed as the first bishop of the apostolic vicariate of Wallis et Futuna in 1936. He held the position until his retirement in 1961. He supported forced labour in Uvea and pledged allegiance to the government of Vichy France. He and other leaders on Wallis and Futuna remained loyal to the Vichy government despite appeals from Governor of New Caledonia Henri Sautot.

== Later life ==
Poncet declined his family's offer to return to France. He died on Wallis island, on 18 September 1973. He was buried in the Cathedral of Our Lady of the Assumption, Mata-Utu. Several stamps were issued in his memory in 2003, 2008, and 2013.

== Works cited ==
=== Books ===
- Catalogue de cotation des Timbres de Monaco et des Territoires Français d'Outre-Mer 2025. Yvert et Tellier. 2024. ISBN 978-2868143297.
- Bennett, Judith; Wanhalla, Angela, eds. (2016). Mothers' Darlings of the South Pacific: The Children of Indigenous Women and U.S. Servicemen, World War II. University of Hawai'i Press. ISBN 9780824868734.
- Poncet, Alexandre (2011). Un prêtre aux armées. Ysec Editions. ISBN 9782846731393.
- Lachenal, Guillaume (2022). The Doctor Who Would Be King. Duke University Press. ISBN 9781478015246.
- Maurer, Anaïs (2024). The Ocean on Fire: Pacific Stories from Nuclear Survivors and Climate Activists. Duke University Press. ISBN 9781478059059.

=== Journals ===
- Darmancier, Kisho (1974). "Nécrologie". Journal de la Société des Océanistes. 42 (43). Société des Océanistes: 120–121.
