= Overseas territory (France) =

French top-level subdivision applied to certain overseas entities

The term overseas territory (French: territoire d'outre-mer, TOM) is an administrative division of France and is currently only applied to the French Southern and Antarctic Lands.

The division differs from that of overseas department and region (French: Départements et régions d'outre-mer or DROM), but because of some common peculiarities, DOMs, TOMs and other overseas possessions under other statuses are often referred to collectively as les DOM/TOM. Unlike the British Overseas Territories, which are not constitutionally parts of the United Kingdom or its national territory, they are integral parts of the French Republic.

== Former overseas territories ==
- New Caledonia, from 1946 to 1999, now a sui generis collectivity
- French Polynesia, from 1946 to 2003, now an overseas collectivity
- Saint Pierre and Miquelon, from 1946 to 1976 and 1985 to 2003, now an overseas collectivity
- French West Africa, from 1946 to 1958, later replaced by Republic of Dahomey, Guinea, Ivory Coast, Mali Federation, Mauritania, Niger, and the Republic of Upper Volta.
- French Equatorial Africa, from 1946 to 1958, replaced by the Central African Republic, Chad, and Gabon
- Wallis and Futuna, from 1961 to 2003, now an overseas collectivity
- Territory of the Comoros from 1946 to 1961, internal autonomy
- Mayotte, from 1974 to 2003, now an overseas department
- French Territory of the Afars and the Issas, from 1967 to 1977, now the independent state of Djibouti

== See also ==
- 2009 Mahoran status referendum
- Administrative divisions of France
- Overseas collectivity
- Overseas country of France
- Overseas department and region
- Overseas France
- Special member state territories and the European Union
