= Customary kings of Wallis and Futuna =

Leaders of Uvea, Alo, and Sigave

- (wls + fud) Hau et Sau
- Flag of Wallis and Futuna. Three of the white triangles represent the customary kings, while the last one represents the High Administrator.

Profile
- Country: Wallis and Futuna
- Ethnicity: Wallisian, Futunan, Tongan

Chief
- Eufenio Takala (Sigave); Lino Leleivai (Alo); Patalione Kanimoa (Uvea)

The customary kings of Wallis and Futuna are the leaders of the three traditional kingdoms of Uvea, Alo, and Sigave, which form part of the French overseas collectivity of Wallis and Futuna, located in Polynesia in the Pacific Ocean. Wallis and Futuna coexist with the Oceanian monarchies of Samoa and Tonga. The authority and powers of the customary kings are recognized by the 1961 statute of Wallis and Futuna, which thus constitutes the last three active monarchies recognized by the French state on French territory. (Note: These are indeed the last non-metropolitan kings, as in mainland France, the last King of the French was Louis-Philippe I, who reigned from 1830 to 1848.) Additionally, the customary kings receive financial compensation from the state.

Following the settlement of the three islands of Wallis, Futuna, and Alofi by Austronesian populations of Lapita culture, who subsequently became Polynesian, several distinct chieftaincies were established. From the 15th century onwards, the Wallisian monarchy came under significant Tongan influence. Throughout history, the number of kingdoms fluctuated until it was fixed in the 19th century by missionaries, particularly in Futuna, which was divided between Alo and Sigave.

The kings of this region are referred to as Sau and Hau in the local languages, Futunan and Wallisian, respectively. However, anthropologists consider the French term "king" an inadequate translation. These sovereigns play an indispensable role in the social and political life of the three kingdoms. They bear responsibility for maintaining social order and the well-being of the inhabitants, administering customary justice—particularly in matters about land—and overseeing environmental and natural resources. They are supported by a chieftaincy in managing these various local affairs. In these profoundly religious societies, the kings are regarded as intermediaries between God and humans, bestowing upon the sovereigns considerable symbolic importance, with the honorific language used to address them.

The Wallisian and Futunan monarchy is an aristocratic system, with the royal roles rotating among the kingdom's noble families (or 'aliki). The role is not hereditary; rather, it is selected by the royal families following negotiations that can span several months and occasionally result in succession crises (such as the customary crisis affecting Uvea since 2005). In general, reigns last only a few years. The royal role is primarily male, although the Kingdom of Uvea has seen four women assume the supreme role.

== Terminology ==
In French, the vocabulary used for customary sovereigns is "king" or "customary king." This term was introduced by missionaries in the 19th century, though it is an imperfect translation of the Polynesian conception of power. However, it is one of the closest approximations of the Polynesian terms, hence its common usage.

=== Vernacular names ===
In the Wallisian and Futunan languages, the rulers are referred to as "hau" and "sau", respectively. These terms refer to a specific role that is not precisely equivalent to that of a king in Western terms. These customary kings may be described as "supreme chiefs" due to the veneration they receive from the local population. However, they could also be seen as "highest authorities" or "supreme judges", as they preside over customary justice in their kingdoms. (Note: For anthropologist Françoise Douaire-Marsaudon, this term can indeed be translated as "the supreme authority and the supreme judge.") Nevertheless, a faithful translation remains impossible, as no true equivalent exists in French.

=== Custom ===
In the context of Wallis and Futuna, the term "customary" is used to denote the customs that represent the core values and collective living rules of the community. Although these values are traditional, they have also been influenced by external factors, such as Catholicism. The term "custom" also refers to the exchange of food and services within a gift-giving system, known as "performing the custom." Additionally, the term "custom" can define the chieftaincy, its members, practices, and values. This is how the customary kings rule over their kingdoms in a manner that aligns with the land, known in Wallisian as faka fenua.

=== Titles ===
There are five titles in the Kingdom of Wallis and Futuna. In Wallis, the term "Hau" refers to the king. However, in the kingdom of Uvea, the title Lavelua is more commonly employed. In Futuna, the term Sau is also used to refer to the king, although each kingdom has a specific title. The titles Tu'i Agaifo and Tu'i Sigave are used, respectively, for the kings of Alo and Sigave. The Lavelua title in Uvea originated following the victory of the district of Hahake over the other two districts of the island, Mu'a and Hihifo, which occurred around the 1500s. The victorious district, whose people are descended from the Takumasiva lineage, former Tongans who settled on the island, initiated a transformation of the customary monarchy by establishing a new title, that of Lavelua. In accordance with the legend, the individual who bears this title is expected to experience a profound connection with the ancestors. Between 1858 and 1869, which encompassed the reign of Queen Falakika Seilala, the title transformed, evolving into a royal title. (Note: Chave-Dartoen 2017, pp. 105–144) The sovereign of Alo is titled Tu'i Agaifo, although he was previously known as Fakavelikele. In Futunan, Tu'i is a title that signifies a chieftain, while Agaifo is the ancient appellation of the kingdom of Alo, which translates to "chief of Agaifo" in French. The sovereign of Sigave is designated as Tu'i Sigave or Keletaona, contingent upon the family lineage of the monarch. Tu'i is another designation for a chieftain in Futunan. Sigave is the designation for the kingdom, which translates to "chief of Sigave" in French.

It is important to distinguish between the titles of the King of Futuna and the "Emperor of Futuna" fish, which inhabits the vicinity of the island and is named in honor of Akihito, the current Emperor of Japan.

== History ==
The settlement of Wallis and Futuna is estimated to have occurred between 1300 and 800 BCE. Chieftaincies gradually emerged and developed independently on each island, with Wallis particularly influenced by Tongan invasions in the 15th century. The Christianization of these two islands in the 1840s prompted missionaries to consolidate the disparate chieftaincies and delineate the boundaries of the Alo and Sigave kingdoms. This occurred before the unification of Wallis and Futuna into an 1888 protectorate. In 1961, Wallis and Futuna attained the status of a French overseas territory, establishing an institutional equilibrium wherein the customary kings assumed a pivotal role alongside the French administration.

=== Creation of chieftaincies and kingdoms ===
==== The Tongan conquest in Wallis (15th century) and the first kings ====
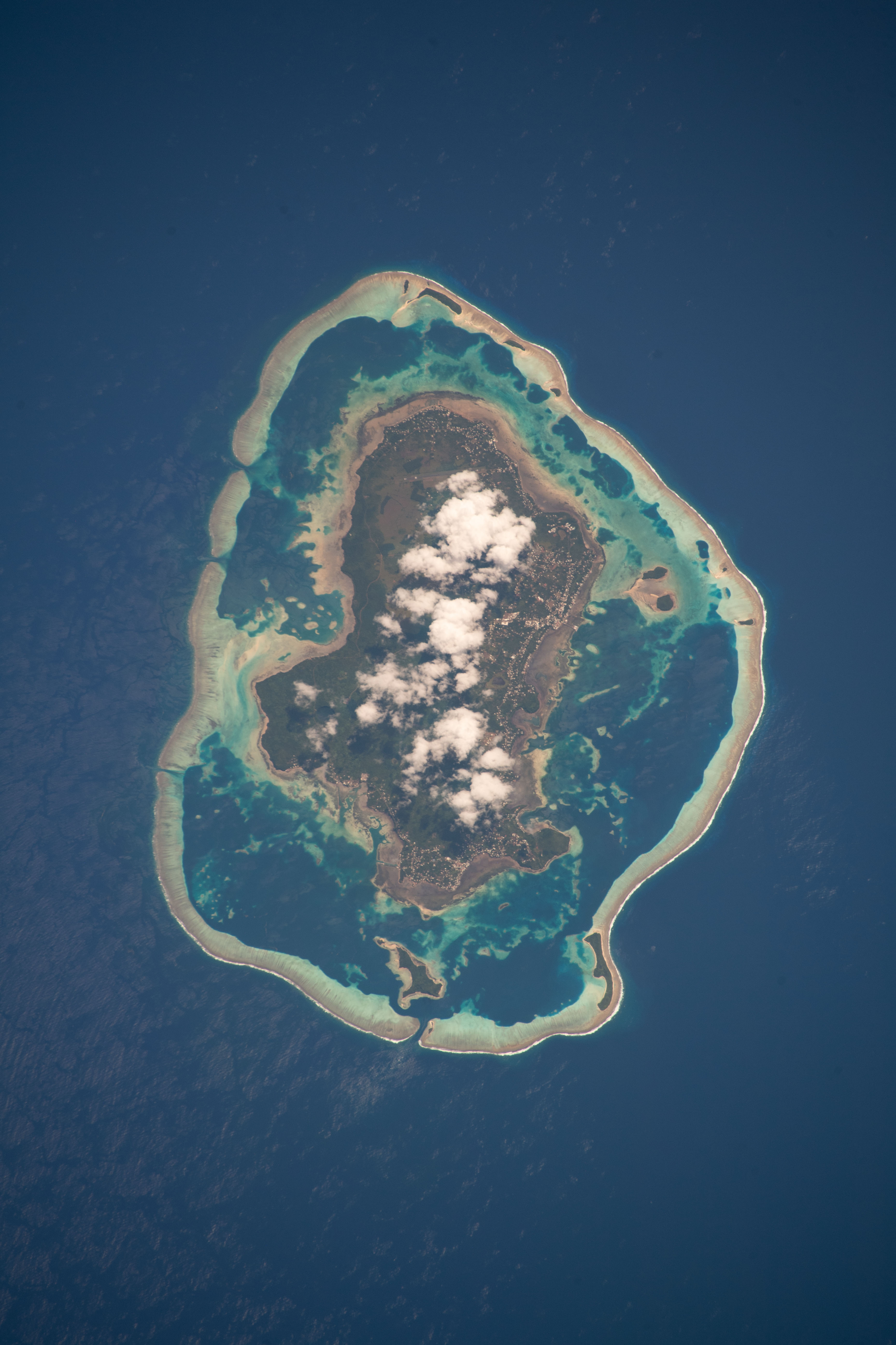
Satellite image of Wallis.

In the early 15th century, the presence of small human communities in Wallis was already discernible, with the majority situated along the island's western coastline, next to the lagoon's entrances. Subsequently, these communities proliferated throughout Wallis. In the 15th century, Tongan settlers, dispatched by the Tu'i Tonga Kau'ulufonua fekai, arrived on the island. Indigenous population, dispersed across the island, did not offer resistance to the invaders. Subsequently, the Tu'i Tonga Ga'asialili, the former king and the individual responsible for the conquest, proceeded to subjugate the kingdom of Uvea and subsequently partition its territory among three chiefs. Hoko, Kalafilia, and Fakate correspond to the island's initial districts. To reinforce their already significant domination, the Tongans constructed many forts, including Kolonui, which was one of the most important. This era is referred to as the "period of forts." This period of Tongan domination of Wallis ended around 1500, due to the waning interest of the Tongans in the island. Subsequently, the island's governance was delegated to the Wallisians, resulting in the establishment of a dynastic political system that was modeled on the Tongan structure. Nevertheless, the Tongans retained a degree of influence over the governance of Wallis. A pyramid-shaped chieftaincy was established, headed by a Hau ("king") surrounded by advisors. This dynastic period, which commenced around 1500, saw the inception of the genealogies of successive kings of Wallis (Lavelua). Approximately a century after the Tongan conquest, Uvea gradually regained its independence from Tonga, reaching its zenith in the proclamation of island independence by one Tu'i Tonga.

==== Political evolution of Futuna into two kingdoms ====
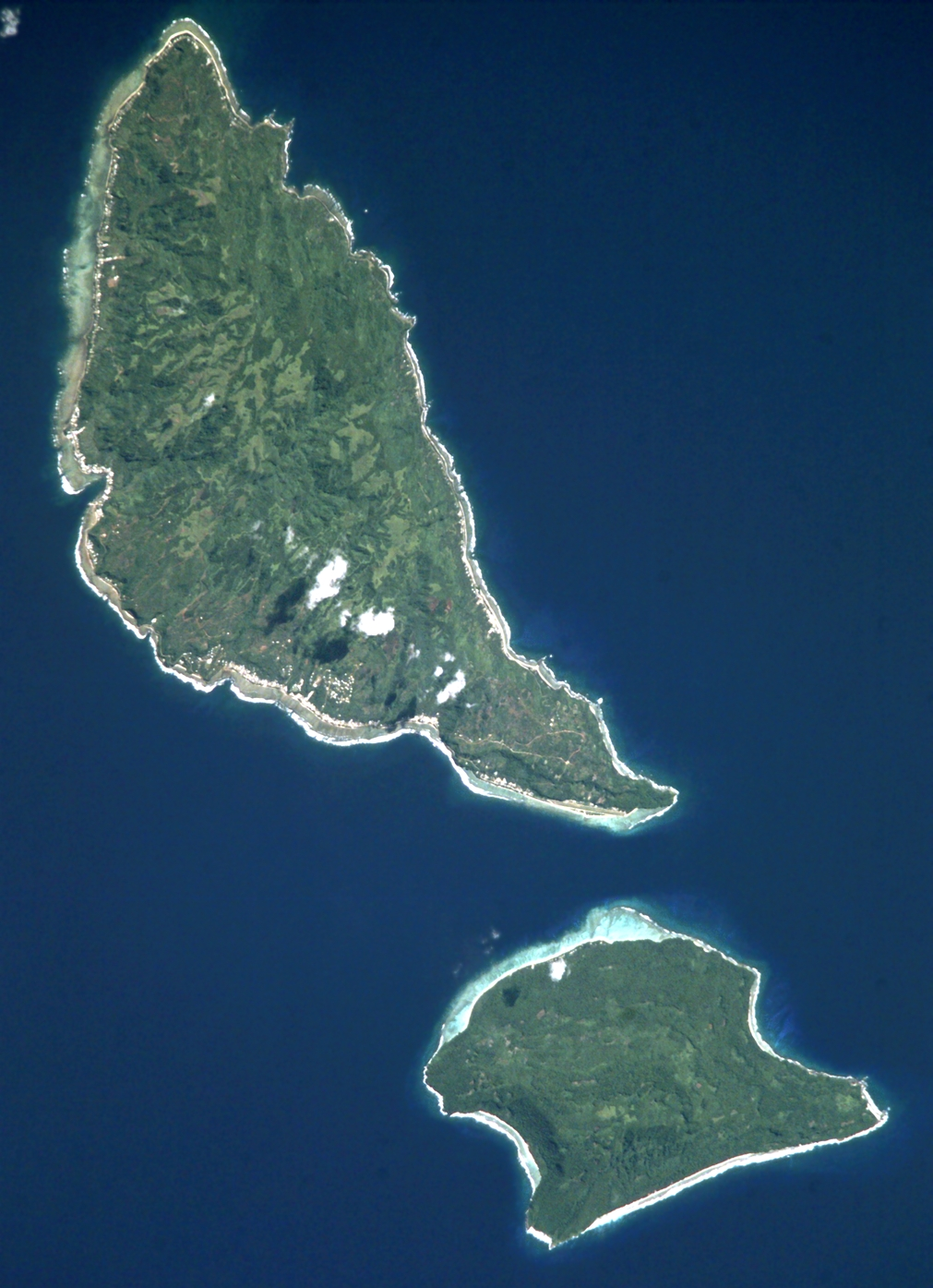
Satellite image of Futuna to the north and Alofi to the south.

Futuna did not suffer the same fate as Wallis and successfully resisted the Tongan invasions. According to oral tradition, there were strong connections with the Samoans, who arrived peacefully. It is believed that the rulers of the Kingdom of Alo are of Samoan origin, belonging to the Fakavelikele lineage. In response to the expansionist policies of the Tongan kingdom, the inhabitants of Futuna were compelled to retreat inland and construct a series of defensive forts, known as kolo. During this period, the island was divided into numerous factions that frequently engaged in conflict and formed alliances in response to shared threats. Despite these challenges, the Futunians could repel Tongan invasions, although these events left cultural imprints, including the potential adoption of kava as a symbol of chieftaincy authority.

The final period of Futunan history, spanning from 1700 onwards, is designated as the "brown earth" (Kele Kula) era, a term that alludes to the brown soil characteristic of the taro fields. During this period, no kingdoms existed; rather, various chieftaincies gathered in the mountains. The inhabitants subsequently returned to settle by the sea. During this phase, the various independent and rival political entities of Futuna gradually united, resulting in the formation of a unified political structure. This process involved the consolidation of populations around chiefs known as kolo in Futunan.

Upon their arrival in Futuna on November 7, 1837, the French Marist missionaries discovered that only two rival political entities remained: the kingdom of Sigave and that of Tu'a, which was soon to be renamed the kingdom of Alo. These two kingdoms frequently engaged in conflict. The last conflict in Futuna, the Vai War, occurred on August 10, 1839. The kingdom of Alo emerged victorious, defeating Sigave. Following this event, Niuliki became the king of all Futuna until he died in 1842. Upon his passing, the unified kingdom split back into two—Alo and Sigave—and a king was crowned in each kingdom.

=== 19th century ===
==== Christianization ====
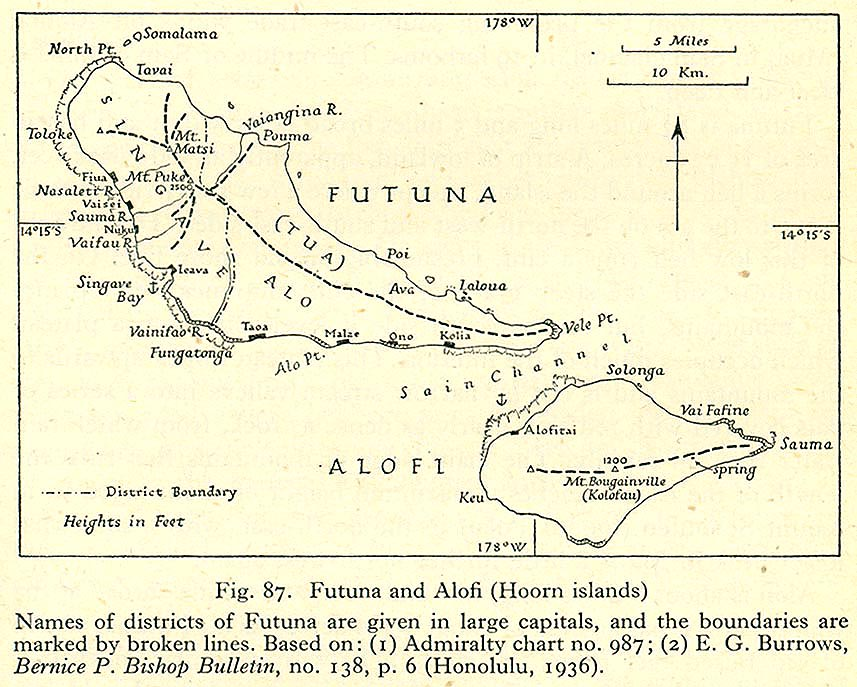
Old map of the Horn Islands archipelago with Futuna and Alofi, including the kingdoms of Sigave and Alo.

In the late 1830s, Marist missionaries, most notably Pierre Bataillon and Pierre Chanel, were responsible for the conversion of the inhabitants of both islands to Catholicism. (Note: Chave-Dartoen 2017, p. 59 (Chapter 2).) On Wallis, Soane-Patita Vaimua Lavelua I became the inaugural sovereign to be baptized, followed shortly thereafter by the people of Futuna. The missionaries rapidly assumed a prominent role within the various chiefdoms, becoming a pivotal force on both islands. They were principally responsible for drafting and translating the laws issued by the customary kings.

The monarchy was established by missionaries, beginning with the Wallis Code (known in Wallisian as Tohi fono), which was enacted by Queen Amelia Tokagahahau in 1871. This code established the supreme authority of the Lavelua (King of Wallis) (Note: Chave-Dartoen 2017, p. 318) and formalized the structure of the chieftaincy, comprising six ministers, three district chiefs, and 21 village chiefs, all of whom were appointed by the king. Furthermore, the code established Catholicism as the official religion. However, much of the code was soon forgotten, as the Wallisian monarchy was perceived by the people as part of an enduring system, despite its historical evolution in response to conflicts among various clans and royal families.

==== Protectorate (1888–1961) ====
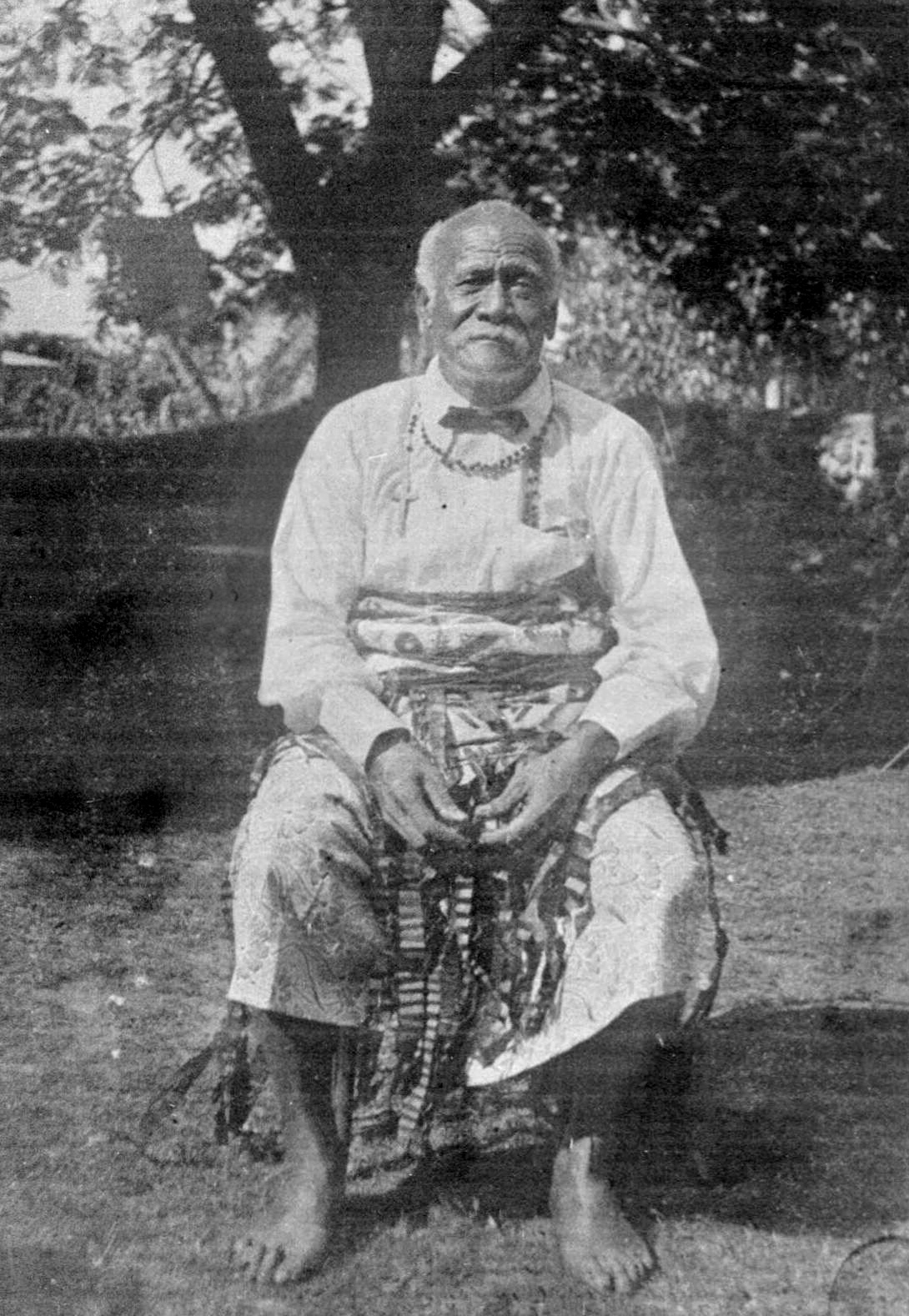
Lusiano Aisake was one of the many Lavelua to reign during the protectorate. He was on the throne from August 1904 to September 1906.

The Wallis and Futuna Protectorate was established on March 5, 1888. The initial request for the establishment of the Wallis and Futuna Protectorate was made by Queen Amelia Tokagahahau Aliki in 1842, influenced by the missionaries. The primary objective was to safeguard the Catholic islands from the encroachment of Protestant influences in the vicinity. In 1887, the Lavelua affixed their signature to the document, followed by the two Futunian kings in the subsequent year. This action effectively unified Wallis and Futuna under a singular political entity for the first time. Nevertheless, the establishment of the protectorate did not result in the formal colonization of the islands. The French presence remained relatively insignificant on both islands. A French resident was appointed to fulfill many functions, including maintaining public order, managing the budget, collecting taxes, building infrastructure, and validating the appointment of customary kings. However, the resident was not empowered to exercise authority over Wallisians and Futunians, necessitating close collaboration with the sovereigns. The majority of French residents were unable to communicate in Wallisian or comprehend the local cultural norms, relying on interpreters and missionaries. The kings of Futuna and Uvea retained comprehensive customary authority over their subjects, (Note: In 1886, the protectorate treaty with Uvea, signed by Amelia Tokagahahau Aliki, stipulated that "the queen retains all her independence and all her authority over the natives.") with Futuna enjoying even greater autonomy due to the resident's infrequent visits, which occurred only a few days each year.

During the period of the protectorate, 16 kings and queens assumed the role of ruler in Wallis, with the majority ruling for a few years. However, crises occasionally led to rapid succession, as evidenced by the events of 1933. From 1933 to 1941, Resident Jean-Joseph David even suspended the election of a king. According to historian Jean-Claude Roux, four families alternated in holding the royal office, maintaining control through strategic marriages. In Futuna, amidst rivalry between the two kingdoms of Alo and Sigave, 20 kings ruled Alo, and 13 ruled Sigave from 1900 to 1960. (Note: Roux 1995, p. 281)

Trade relations with the authorities became strained during the period of the protectorate. In a rare move, the three customary kings agreed, in the 1910s–1920s, to prohibit the trade of copra to counteract the abuses perpetrated by merchants.

=== 20th century ===
==== The "King David" crisis (1933–1938) ====
David's tenure as a French resident was distinguished by his strict rule. David initially served as a military doctor before arriving in Uvea in 1933, where he assumed control of the protectorate. David was the sole colonist on the island, except for approximately fifteen missionaries and two traders. As Claire Fredj observes, David's roles extended beyond that of a physician to encompass those of a resident, chief of works, justice of the peace, and even a de facto ruler. He spearheaded the establishment of a new hospital and school, while also promoting physical fitness through the introduction of sports. Additionally, he compelled the Wallisians to engage in forced labor, to facilitate the island's development.

Following the death of King Mikaele Tufele II in November 1933, David, who already held considerable influence in Wallis, chose not to hold an election for a new king, effectively assuming the status of Lavelua himself. From 1933 to 1941, the throne of Lavelua remained vacant. David's marriage to Sophie-Marie Brial, a princess of Wallis, reinforced his position. He was subsequently referred to as Te Hau Tavite, or "King David", by the people.

David initiated a series of significant public works projects, including the maintenance of roadways, the development of coconut plantations, and the introduction of new crops such as cassava. He incorporated the traditional Wallisian labor system, fatogia, into his governance, using it to establish customary work duties. This practice had previously been employed by Queen Amelia Tokagahahau. Due to his authoritarian rule, he was given the nicknames "Doctor Machete" or lea tahi (Wallisian for "the one who only orders once", indicating immediate obedience).

==== Consequences of World War II and end of the protectorate (1946–1961) ====
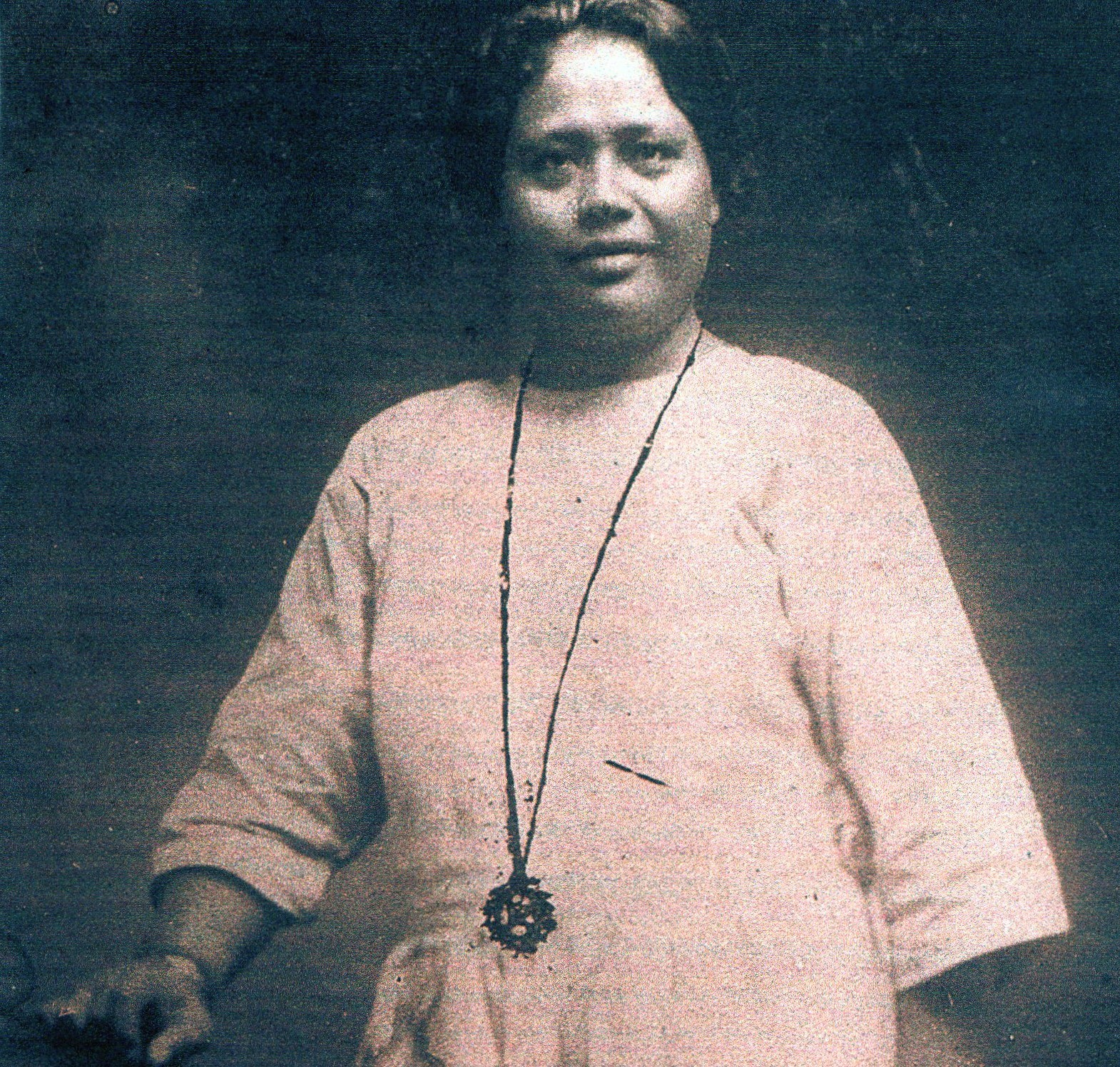
Aloisia Brial is one of only four women to have held the royal office.

The islands were isolated from the outside world as a result of their involvement in World War II. For two years, the bishop and the resident demonstrated allegiance to the Vichy regime, which resulted in the islands being entirely isolated until the arrival of American forces on Wallis in 1942. The arrival of American troops disrupted the socio-political equilibrium of the Uvea kingdom, precipitating the creation of numerous salaried positions. Those who had previously been commoners, working for the army, found themselves earning more than the nobles. In response to this threat to customary authority, the French resident was compelled to raise the stipends of the chiefs by 1,000%. Following the departure of the American forces in 1944, the island was confronted with a significant economic and political crisis. From 1945 to 1950, Uvea was ruled by three different kings: Leone Manikitoga, Pelenato Fuluhea, and Kapeliele Tufele. On December 22, 1953, a new succession crisis emerged amidst ongoing tensions between the monarch, the government, and the diplomatic mission. Aloisia Brial was designated as Queen of Uvea. Her tenure was marked by political instability, with her authoritarian approach to governance leading to opposition from her chieftaincy. In 1957, she was outvoted by the royal council but refused to abdicate, which resulted in significant tensions as the Mu'a district nearly seceded. She ultimately relinquished her position on September 12, 1958. Following arduous negotiations, Tomasi Kulimoetoke II ascended to the throne on March 12, 1959, thereby establishing his authority. A labor migration movement emerged, directed toward New Caledonia and the New Hebrides, under the auspices of the kings to guarantee fair compensation for those who emigrated. Lavelua Pelenato Fuluhea, for instance, imposed a bonus of 250 francs as a "reward for the king and chiefs" per worker.

In contrast, Futuna was spared the impact of the American presence and remained untouched by the resulting upheavals. However, the political situation remained unstable, with frequent changes in the monarchy. In November 1951, a crisis emerged in Alo. Subsequently, Tuiagaifo Silisio Katea was deposed due to concerns regarding the conduct of young Futunians who had resided in New Caledonia. Two claimants vied for the crown. Additionally, two candidates emerged as contenders for the throne: Alosio, supported by traditional leaders, and Petelo Talae, who enjoyed the backing of the younger Futunians. As tensions intensified, incidents of arson occurred, prompting French resident Desjardins to travel to the island by boat with ten soldiers. He ultimately decided to disqualify both candidates, appointing a neutral king to mediate the conflict and selecting ministers from both rival factions. As a result, the two claimants were exiled from Futuna for three months to prevent further conflicts.

==== Status of 1961 ====
Although the monarchy was formally abolished in France, it persisted in Wallis and Futuna due to Article 75 of the French Constitution of 1958, which granted the territory a "personal status." The legal framework was civilist, with civil law governing the territory. However, territories with personal status could also apply customary law under certain conditions. Nevertheless, the constitution remained ambiguous about Wallis and Futuna, as it was not explicitly named:

Republican citizens who do not have the common law civil status, as referred to in Article 34 of the Constitution of the Fifth French Republic, retain their personal status as long as they have not renounced it.

— Article 75 of the Constitution of October 4, 1958

A referendum was held a year later, in 1959, which resulted in the designation of Wallis and Futuna as an overseas territory with a special status. The 1961 law (No. 61-814) brought an end to the protectorate regime. However, Article 3 of the law specifically provides for the preservation of customary rights and the chieftaincies (ministers and village chiefs). The kings, who until then were in a legal gray area, were officially recognized by law:

The Republic guarantees the people of the territory of the Wallis and Futuna Islands the free exercise of their religion, as well as respect for their beliefs and customs insofar as these are not contrary to the general principles of law and the provisions of this law.

— Law No. 61-814 of July 29, 1961, granting the Wallis and Futuna Islands the status of an overseas territory

This allows for the customary kings to be preserved, though without specifying their prerogatives. Indeed, until that date, the French authorities had demonstrated a notable lack of interest, even a "condescending indifference", toward this territory, its people, and its chieftaincy. Since its designation as an overseas territory on July 29, 1961, and subsequent classification as a collectivity in 2003, Wallis and Futuna have been obliged to adhere to the tenets of the French Constitution. From 1961 onward, every Wallisian and Futunian has been granted French nationality, thereby subjecting them to the jurisdiction of the French state and its laws, including those about the kings.

Since the 1961 status, regulations regarding the customary kings have undergone minimal evolution, if any. In 2021, French President Emmanuel Macron highlighted the necessity to clarify this text, even characterizing it as "undoubtedly the most unconventional of the Republic."

=== 21st century ===
==== Wallisian customary crisis (since 2005) ====
In 1998, a legal-political scandal erupted in Wallis involving "K.", a high-ranking woman close to the king, who was accused of embezzlement and sentenced to two years' imprisonment by the Nouméa court. The Lavelua, Tomasi Kulimoetoke II, played a pivotal role in this matter by offering unwavering support to the woman in question. He provided her with a place of refuge within the royal palace, and the gendarmes dispatched to retrieve her were prevented from entering. Following his re-election in 2002, French President Jacques Chirac ultimately granted the woman amnesty to avoid any potential conflict with the Wallis king. Anthropologist Françoise Douaire-Marsaudon analyzed this crisis as a manifestation of distrust toward customary justice, emphasizing the societal division between those who supported French justice and those who supported the accused. The king's supporters perceived the proceedings as judicial harassment and asserted that the supreme authority in matters of justice should be the Lavelua. They advocated for the matter to be resolved through customary justice.

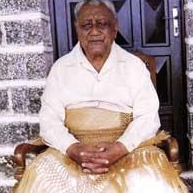
Tomasi Kulimoetoke II, Wallis' longest reigning king (48 years).

In June 2005, another political crisis occurred when the grandson of King Tomasi Kulimoetoke II (who had been in power for 46 years) was convicted of involuntary manslaughter after killing a motorcyclist while driving under the influence. The prince sought refuge in the royal palace to evade the gendarmes. This decision resulted in a schism among the aristocratic families, divided between their customary loyalty and their allegiance to the French state. Two distinct factions emerged: those who supported the king and those who advocated for reforms to the customs. According to Frédéric Angleviel, the Kulimoetoke family, from which numerous high chieftains originated, was reluctant to relinquish power after so many years.

The reformers, initially supported by the island's Superior Administrator Christian Job, proceeded to enthrone a new king. (Note: Angleviel 2006, pp. 148–151) The Administrator acknowledged the legitimacy of the new chieftaincy and ceased the disbursement of the 5,500-euro stipend that the French state had been obligated to provide to Tomasi Kulimoetoke and his ministers. In response, supporters of the king occupied Hihifo Airport and erected barricades to impede the arrival of gendarmes from New Caledonia. The situation ultimately improved with the intervention of a French mediator, who recognized the authority of King Tomasi Kulimoetoke. As a result, the rival king's enthronement ceremony was canceled. This event had a significant and enduring impact, with tensions remaining high in the following years. Reconciliation dialogues have continued between the two rival chieftaincies.

In April 2016, the crisis persisted as two rival kings were enthroned, marking the first instance of such a development. On April 15, Tominiko Halagahu, the chief of the northern district, was appointed king by the Great Chieftaincy. Two days later, Patalione Kanimoa, the former president of the Wallis and Futuna Territorial Assembly, was also appointed king by the New Chieftaincy. However, on June 3, the French state announced its recognition of only King Patalione Kanimoa. His rival, Tominiko Halagahu, then denounced what he saw as interference by the French Republic in the kingdom's customary affairs. The conflict between the two kings has continued, causing ongoing tensions. Even today, two customary administrations coexist, with each Lavelua appointing their ministers and village representatives.

==== Relations with metropolitan France and the State ====
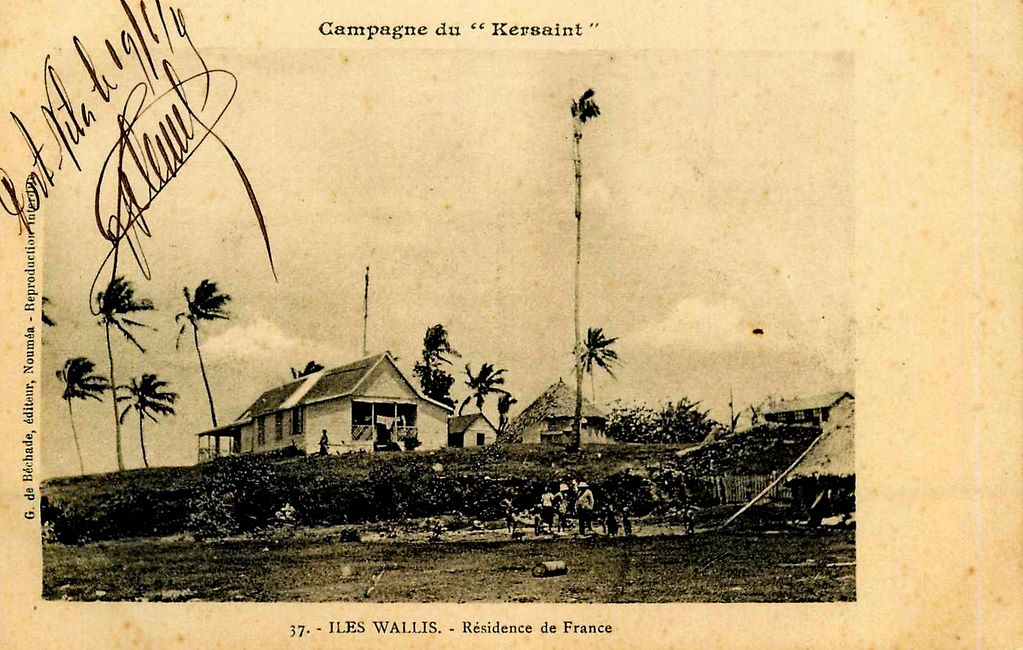
Residence of the French Resident in Wallis and Futuna, 1904–1909. The land was loaned by Queen Amelia Tokagahahau.

From the outset of relations with France during the protectorate and with its representative, the resident of France in Wallis and Futuna, a connection has gradually formed, largely facilitated by Father Henquel, who was well-versed in the customary organization and was able to facilitate dialogue with the administration. Subsequently, kings were invited to take part in official ceremonies, particularly in Wallis, where the Superior Administration is headquartered. This connection persisted following the territory's transition to TOM status in 1961. For instance, Superior Administrators were integrated into organizations such as the territorial council, which played a pivotal role in Wallis and Futuna due to the subsidies it oversees.

The customary kings have met with a sitting French president on three occasions. Jacques Chirac visited both islands in 1986 while serving as Prime Minister, affectionately referring to them as "my two little protégés." On March 17, 2006, as President of the Republic, Chirac extended an invitation to the two kings of Futuna, Soane-Patita Maituku and Visesio Moeliku, to visit Paris.

In July 2016, the customary kings of Alo and Sigave, along with the Prime Minister of Uvea, visited Paris at the invitation of President François Hollande. After his February visit to the islands, Hollande invited the three monarchs to attend the July 14 parade. The Lavelua of Uvea was unable to attend and instead sent his chief of government. The customary delegation seized the opportunity to discuss pending matters, including the annual grant for the health agency.

In July 2021, the 60th-anniversary celebration of Wallis and Futuna's status was scheduled to take place. However, the event was disrupted by the global spread of the novel coronavirus, which affected the islands. Consequently, President Emmanuel Macron's planned visit to Wallis did not occur. Nevertheless, he traveled to French Polynesia, where the virus was less prevalent, and met with representatives from Wallis and Futuna who had made the journey.

=== Current kings ===
Customary king	Coronation	Kingdom	Capital	Title	Flag
Patalione Kanimoa	April 14, 2016	Uvea	Mata Utu	Lavelua	
Lino Leleivai	November 30, 2018	Alo	Ono	Tu'i Agaifo	
Eugenio Takala	March 5, 2016	Sigave	Leava	Tu'i Sigave	

== Powers and functioning ==
=== Prerogatives ===
Despite the limitations of their political authority, kings are responsible for a vast array of duties within their kingdoms and are held in high regard by the local population. They are recognized by the state and receive a monthly stipend, which also serves to compensate the royal ministers and customary district and village chiefs. In 2005, this stipend was 5,500 euros.

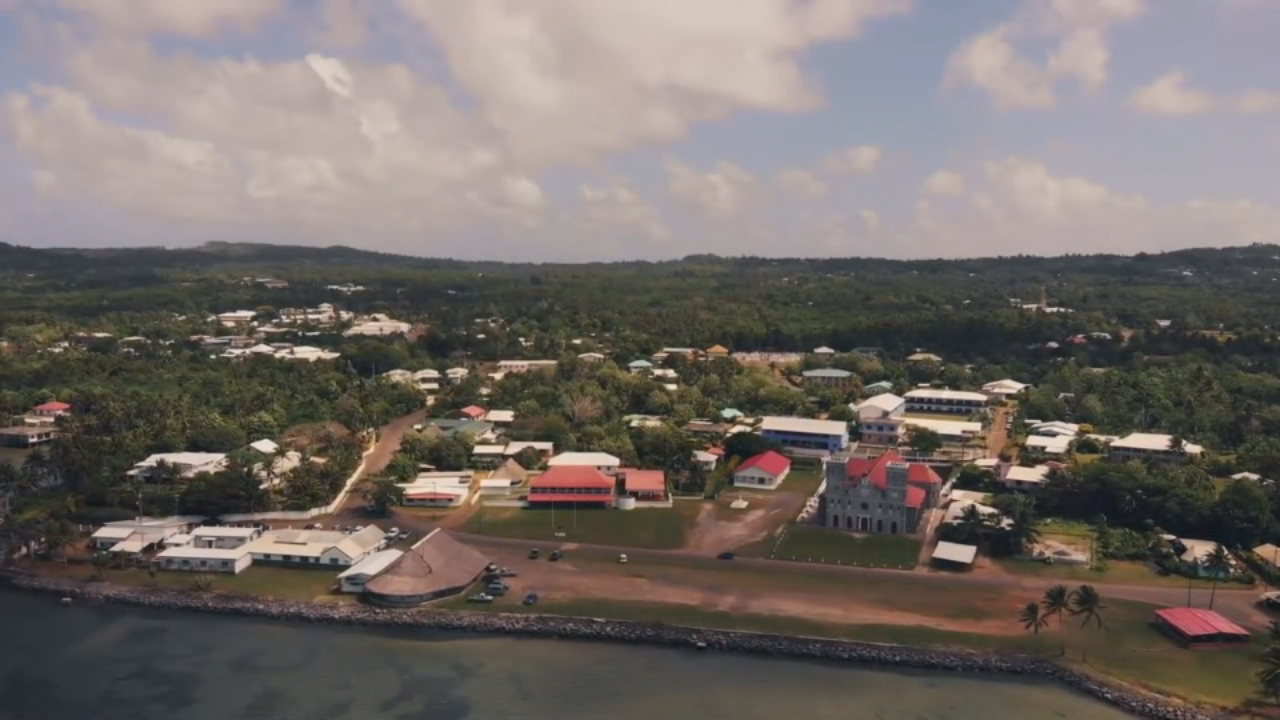
Mata Utu, the capital of Wallis and Futuna, is the main center of political, religious and customary power.

Under customary practice, each king is an ex officio member of the territorial council, along with three other members appointed by the Superior Administrator, the state's representative on the island. In addition, the sovereigns engage in negotiations with the administrator regarding the allocation of various development subsidies for their respective territories. Each king is also responsible for presiding over the council of the administrative district that corresponds with the boundaries of his kingdom. The customary kings serve as guardians of the primary forest, sources of fertility, and the central scrubland. Moreover, they represent the customs (aga'ifenua) and oral traditions known as talatupu'a.

In addition to his other functions, the king also represents the highest judicial authority within the customary justice system, which coexists with the French judicial system, reserved for the most serious crimes.

=== The King's Entourage (Family and Aliki) ===
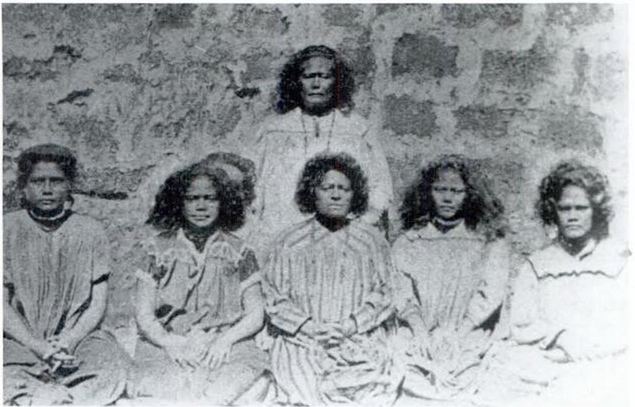
Queen Amélia (center, second row) in 1887 with young noblewomen ('Aliki) in front of the royal palace in Wallis.

As is the case with all monarchs, customary kings are surrounded by a court comprising advisors, ministers, 'aliki (or "nobles"), and the king's family. (Note: For anthropologist Françoise Douaire-Marsaudon, the term "noble" is an improper translation of the word aliki.) This group occupies a significant position within the customary hierarchy. The group of 'aliki may include customary ministers, former kings, district and village chiefs, and members of the territorial assembly. The title of 'aliki is bestowed through a ritual called the "Kava rite", deriving its name from the symbolic plant in the customary world. This group serves to counsel the king in his decisions and to keep him apprised of matters within the kingdom. 'Aliki do not retain this status for life, as kings change and the courts are thus renewed. Only former customary kings retain this title until their death.

Additionally, royal families are accorded a distinct status. A family is designated as Fono Aliki, which translates to "important family" or "royal family", when one of its members has already ascended to the royal throne. These families are present in all three kingdoms, and each king belongs to one or two families comparable to clans. Within these powerful clans, the royal throne or the most important tasks of the kingdom are divided. Membership in a Fono Aliki confers a respected status throughout the kingdom, which is why significant competition exists to have a family member elected as customary king. The royal family of the current king, like the 'aliki, is part of his personal court.

Prior to the widespread Christianization of the islands in the 1840s, the king's descendants constituted a true aristocratic order above the general population. Men were designated as tama'aliki, and women as fine'aliki. For example, King Tomasi Kulimoetoke belonged to the Takumasiva clan, and his family held the throne for 48 years.

=== Becoming a customary king (inauguration) ===
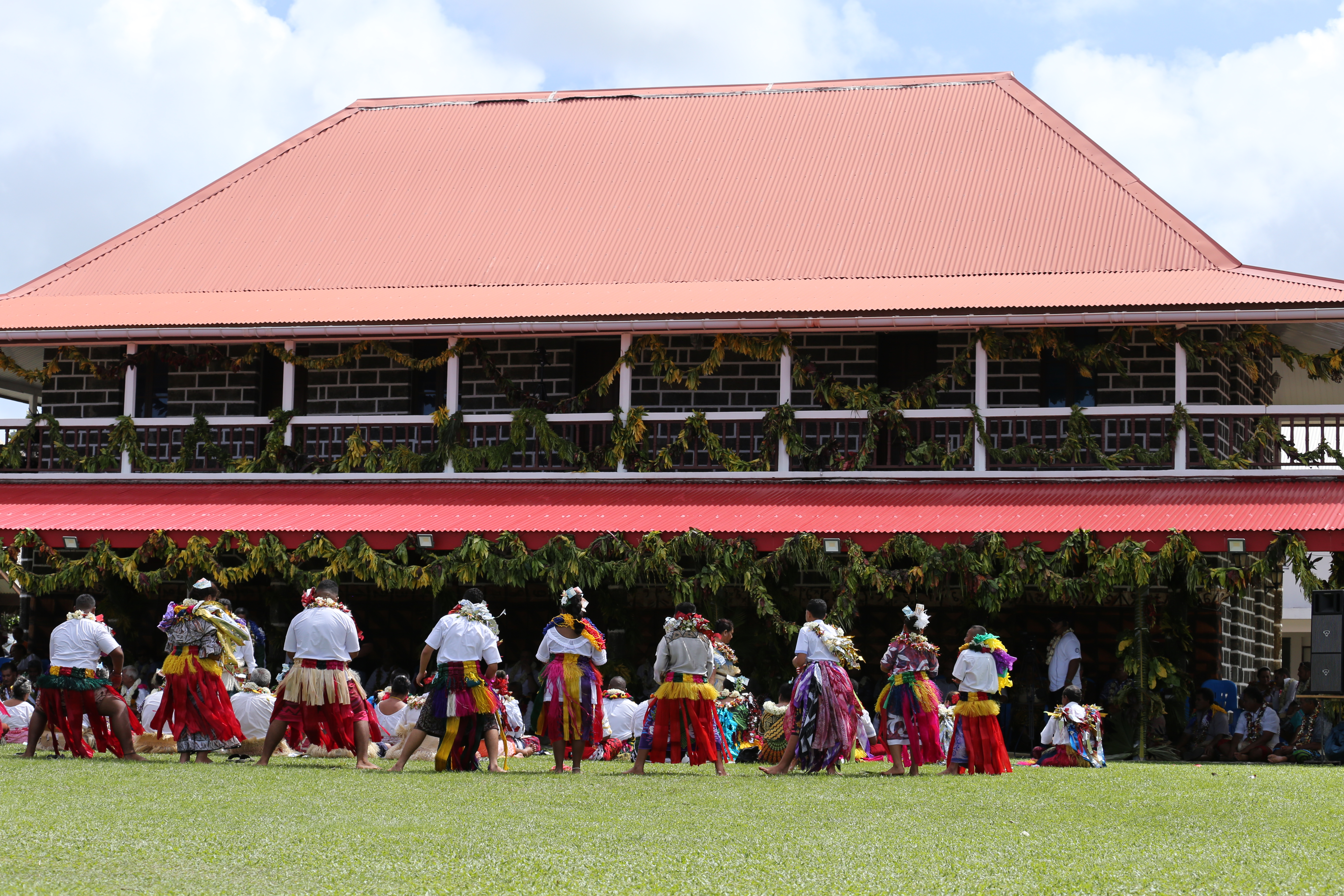
Photograph of the Uvea Royal Palace, seat of the kingdom's chieftaincy. The ceremonies for the enthronement of a new Lavelua take place in front of the palace.

The concept of royal power is not inherently hereditary; rather, it is a matter of choice. Wallis and Futuna is an aristocratic monarchy where the sovereigns are selected from a restricted number of noble families, designated as aliki, in addition to the elders of the kingdom, referred to as aliki matu'a, or "senior chiefs." How royal elections are conducted varies from one kingdom to another. In the kingdoms of Sigave and Alo, each clan presents its candidate, who is known as a kütuga in Futunian. Former kings and some aliki are in attendance at the debates, which are conducted over several meetings in a falefono, a traditional meeting house. The individual who secures the majority vote during these discussions is subsequently designated as the future king. In the event of a stalemate among the aliki, the kaifaka'ulu, the master of ceremonies, is empowered to make the final decision. In Alo, two individuals, the Tu'i Sa'avaka and the Sa'agogo, serve as the "inaugurator" (Kava) and are responsible for officially crowning the new king following a series of local dance rituals. After this, grand festivities and ceremonies are held in both kingdoms to commemorate the investiture of the new monarch. These include the Kava rite and the traditional katoaga, a customary ceremony that marks the official inauguration of the new king.

In Uvea, the process is somewhat distinct. Wallisian sovereigns are selected from royal families, or Fono Aliki, which are ancient Tongan families that have been established in Uvea for generations. It is nearly obligatory for those seeking to ascend the throne to have Tongan blood transmitted through the father. (Note: Chave-Dartoen 2017, p. 22 (Chapter 2)) These Fono Aliki convene within a council, the Fono Faka Kau 'Aliki. The selected individual is expected to possess the qualities traditionally associated with a sovereign. According to anthropologist Marshall Sahlins, this selection method is explained by the presence of rival royal families, which allows for a power-sharing arrangement where families take turns holding the Lavelua title. The Wallisian sovereign then officially received the crown from an "inaugurator" named Ha'afuasia. As in Futuna, ceremonies such as katoaga are organized to introduce the sovereign to the people.

=== Deposition ===
The deposition of a monarch in Wallis and Futuna is a relatively common occurrence in comparison to that of Western monarchies. Nevertheless, this practice is not explicitly delineated in the Wallis Code, which is presumed to delineate the full scope of royal powers. Over time, a precise ritual has been established in the wake of several instances where customary kings were compelled to relinquish their thrones. The decision is made by the clan from which the king originates. One or more clan members proceed to his residence to inform him of the decision. To make the decision effective, they unearth a kava plant, one of the customary symbols. The clan carrying out the deposition gives the plant to the clan tasked with choosing the future king. Despite the significance of these decisions, they can take several weeks or even months to finalize due to lengthy discussions.

These depositions are typically conducted in the aftermath of significant disruptions within the kingdom. This was the case in 1987 during the tenure of Sagato Saliga, who was the reigning monarch of Sigave at the time. His rival, Sosefo Vanai, belonging to two clans, was successful in having Sagato deposed on the grounds of alleged mismanagement of funds provided by the state in the aftermath of Cyclone Raja in December 1986. Wallis experienced a comparable scenario following the conclusion of the Second World War when the American military presence withdrew from the territory. This resulted in a rotating succession of kings from the Lavelua dynasty (Leone Manikitoga, Pelenato Fuluhea, and Kapeliele Tufele) on the throne, as the prevailing economic crisis could not be resolved.

=== Minor and major chiefdoms ===
The Wallisian and Futunian chieftaincy, designated as kau'aliki, is a meticulously structured and well-organized hierarchy. The advent of Christianity in the 1840s precipitated a profound transformation. "The reorganization of the chieftaincy resulted from a joint initiative undertaken by French Marist missionaries and local Polynesian aristocrats who welcomed them. This initiative entailed integrating the new religion, its values, and practices into a social world that was profoundly altered." The customary king is the head of this customary hierarchy. However, as the supreme leader, he is above the chieftaincy and does not truly belong to it; rather, he directs it. In this capacity, he serves to perpetuate local culture and acts as a liaison with the state on administration matters. He is accompanied by a chieftaincy that performs a function analogous to that of a government. In Wallis, the chieftaincy is divided into two distinct entities: the "Grand Chieftaincy" (kau 'aliki lalahi), which corresponds to the king's ministers, and the "Minor Chieftaincy" (kau 'aliki liliki), which is composed of the 21 village chiefs. In addition to the aforementioned factors, one's role in the customary hierarchy is also contingent upon age. In this context, the older one is, the higher the function. The wisdom of elders is highly esteemed, leading to the formation of an "inverted age pyramid."

The "Grand Chieftaincy" meetings between the Kau Matua'aliki (the kingdom's ministers) and the Supreme Chief (the King) are held in Wallis along with the three Fapule. Together, they constitute the Kau 'Aliki ("Council of Ministers"), convening solely at the king's summons during Fono Hau ("Council of the King"). The "Minor Chieftaincy" meetings are designed to facilitate the organization of each kingdom's affairs, bearing resemblance to neighborhood assemblies. Traditionally conducted in the evening, these meetings are prevalent in Futuna, though their practice is on the decline in Wallis. The deliberations take place in a dedicated edifice, the falefono, which translates to "traditional council house" in Wallisian. Kingdom representatives engage in discourse with the king, seeking to identify resolutions to prevailing concerns.

==== Uvea ====
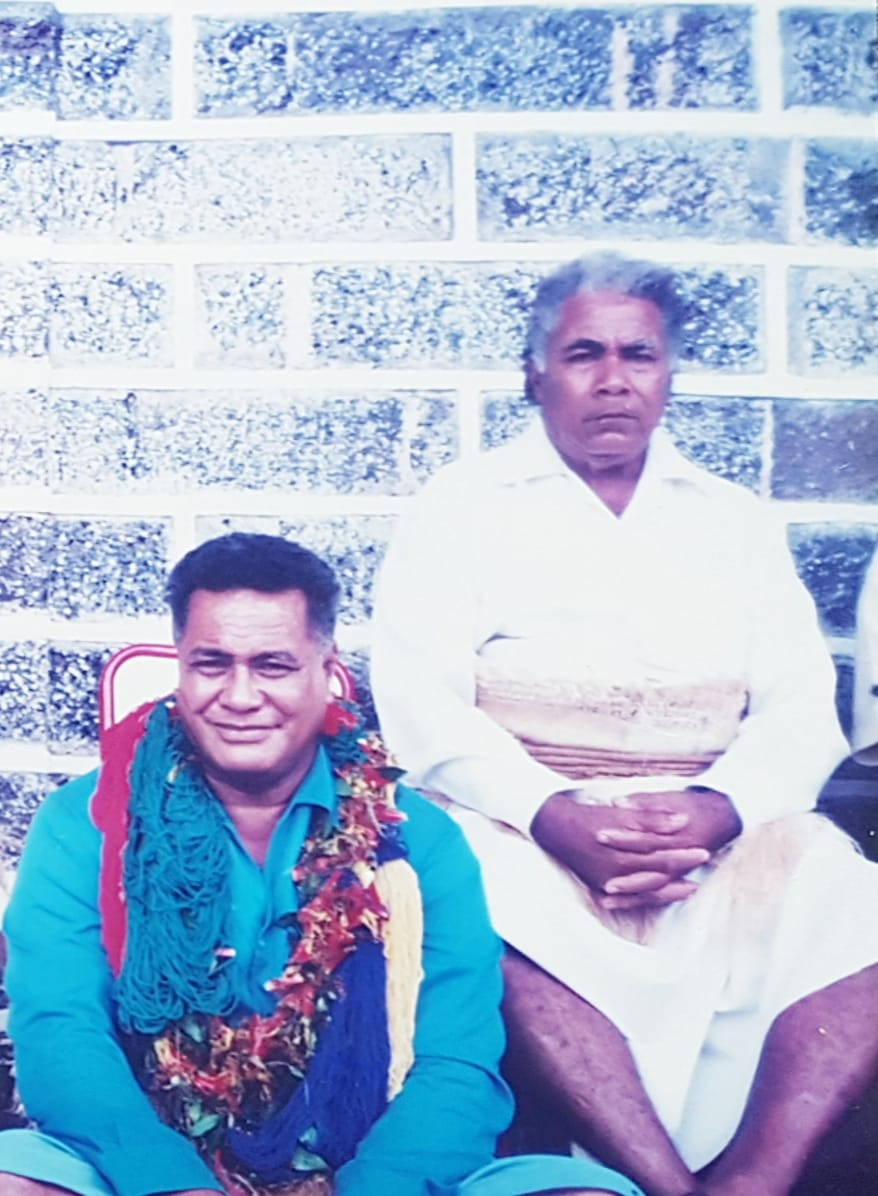
The Wallisian king's ceremonial assistant, the molofaha (Nikola Vaitano'a) and the Mahe customary minister fotuaika (Setefano Vakalepu) at the Assumption feast in 1996.

In Uvea, the Lavalua is assisted by a chieftaincy comprising a Prime Minister (Kalae kivalu) and six other ministers who hold "government portfolio equivalents without fully holding the means." The functions of these ministers have evolved.

The kings are responsible for performing a range of administrative duties, including providing counsel to the administrative district council. However, each minister is assigned specific responsibilities that they assist the king with. They are all present at the customary Council of Ministers with the king.

Function name	Description
Kalae kivalu	Prime Minister, head of government.
Kalae kivalu	Minister of Education, Land Affairs; acts as regent for the king, is responsible for the King's Council and oversees royal succession.
Mahe Fotua'Ika	Minister of Environment (freshwater, collective land management).
Ulu'i Monua	Minister of Agriculture and Fisheries, as well as lagoons and islets; also oversees tourism and crafts.
Kulitea	Minister of Culture and royal communication.
Muko’i fenua	Minister of Village Maintenance, Youth, and Sports.
Fotuatamai	Minister of Customary Justice (especially regarding land issues), royal security, and public health.

In addition, there are various roles in the kingdom without ministerial titles:

Ha'afuasia is a noble figure known as the "inaugurator", responsible for officially crowning the new sovereign of the island. Pulu'i'Uvea oversees the maintenance of public order across the kingdom. In addition to the customary ministers, the king is also assisted by the molofaha, who serves as a ceremonial aide, controls access to the king, and determines who may speak to him and how.

The monarch selects three district chiefs (faipule), also referred to as commoner chiefs, from among his family members. These figures are exclusive to Wallis, though they occupy a relatively inferior position within the customary hierarchy. They possess authority over the 21 village chiefs (akili pule kolo), who are acknowledged by the populace.

==== Sigave ====
In Sigave, the Tu'i Sigave is assisted by a council comprising a Prime Minister (Kalae kivalu) and five ministers. However, due to the smaller population and the shared control of Futuna Island by two kingdoms, royal authority is less stable. This results in village chiefs having greater autonomy to depose the current monarch. A traditional practice in Futuna held that kings did not directly address the people but spoke through a spokesperson and could only address the Territorial Assembly directly.

The monarchs engage in administrative activities, such as offering counsel to the administrative district council. Each minister serves in a capacity aligned with their respective area of expertise, and they collectively participate in the customary Council of Ministers alongside the monarch.

Function name	Description
Kalae kivalu	Prime Minister, Head of Government.
Kaifaka'Ulu	Minister of Education.
Sa'Atula	Minister of the Environment (fresh water, collective land management) and Equipment.
Manafa	Minister of Culture (links with researchers, safeguarding traditions, etc.)
Safeitoga	Minister for Youth and Sport.
Tuitoloke	Minister for village maintenance and road infrastructure.

Additional roles in the kingdom without ministerial titles include:

- Sa'Akafu: Responsible for maintaining public order across the kingdom, coordinating village chiefs and their relations with the king.
- Kaifaka'ulu: Responsible for organizing royal ceremonies.

As there are no districts in the Sigave kingdom, Tu'i Sigave is not required to appoint district chiefs. However, he is responsible for appointing the six village chiefs (akili pule kolo) of the kingdom.

==== Alo ====
The governance structure in both Sigave and Alo is comparable. Each polity has five or six ministers, a master of ceremonies, and a chief of police. However, due to smaller populations and the division of Futuna Island between two kingdoms, royal authority remains less stable. As in Sigave, village chiefs can fairly easily depose the reigning monarch. The tradition, which is now fading in Futuna, once held that kings did not address the people directly but used a spokesperson, with direct communication allowed only in the Territorial Assembly.

The monarchs engage in administrative activities, such as offering counsel to the administrative district council. Each minister provides assistance to the monarch in their respective field of expertise, and they all participate in the customary Council of Ministers with the monarch.

Function name	Description
Kalae kivalu	Prime Minister, Head of Government.
Tiafo'I	Minister of Health (hospitals, distribution of medical equipment, etc.)
Sa'Atula	Minister of Youth and Sports (organization of sporting events: soccer, rugby, etc.)
Tu'Isa'Avaka	Minister of Education.
Tu'Iasoa	Minister of Culture (links with researchers, safeguarding traditions, etc.)
Vakalasi	Minister for the Environment.

Other non-ministerial roles in the kingdom include:

- Sa'Akafu: In charge of maintaining public order across the kingdom and coordinating village chiefs' relations with the king.
- Kaifaka'ulu: Manages the kingdom's ceremonies.
- Tuitoloke: Additional ministers without specific portfolios.

Since there are no districts in the kingdom of Alo, the Tu'i Agaifo does not appoint district chiefs but manages the appointment of the kingdom's nine village chiefs (akili pule kolo).

== Social and symbolic functions ==
=== Social organization: The socio-cosmic world ===
The role of customary kings in Polynesian societies of Wallis and Futuna cannot be understood through the lens of Western concepts of "power" and "politics" alone. Anthropologist Sophie Chave-Dartoen posits a holistic approach, emphasizing the social worldview and cosmology shared by Wallisians and Futunians.

==== Religious cosmology ====
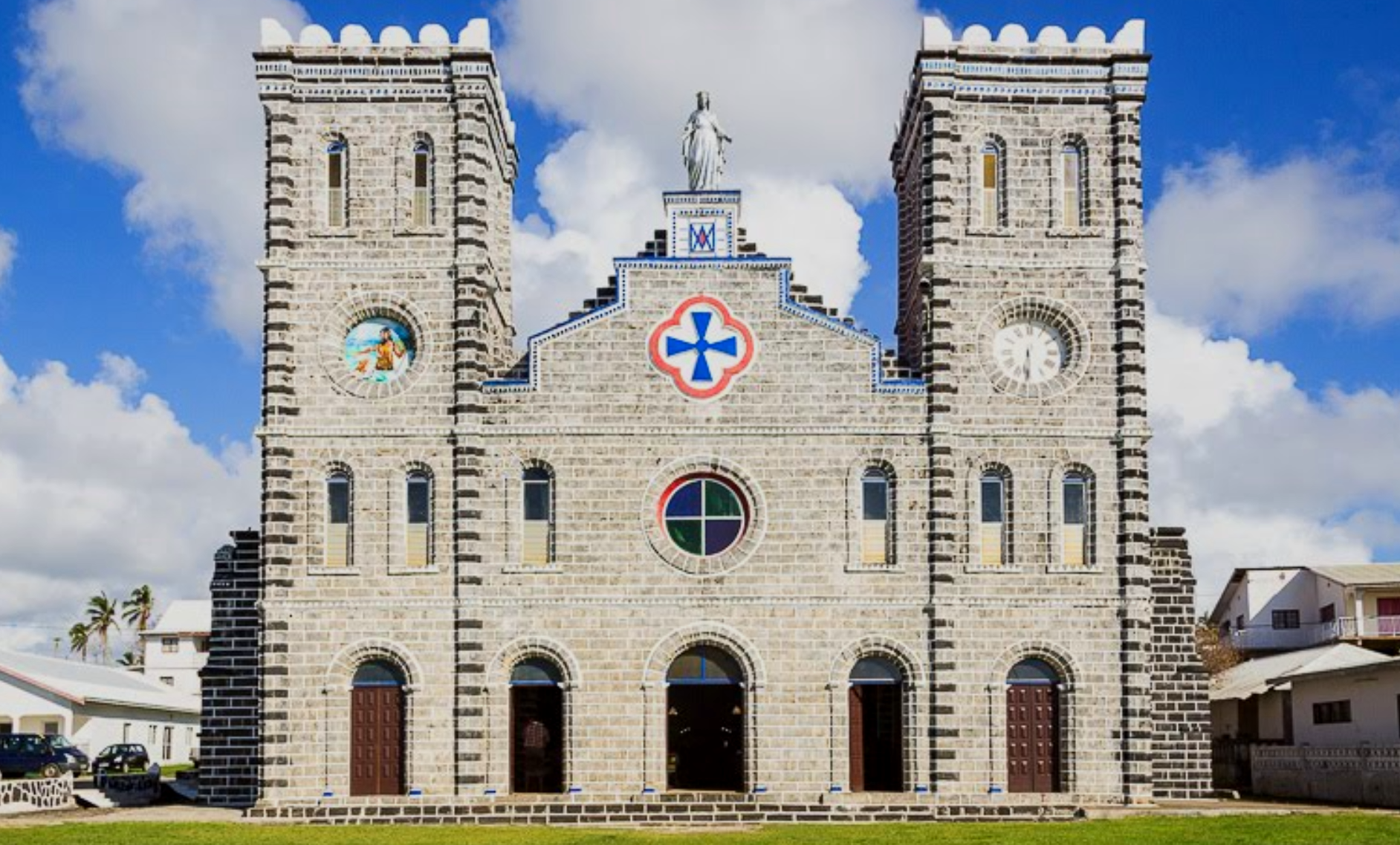
Mata Utu's Notre-Dame-de-l'Assomption cathedral is the burial place of the Lavelua d'Uvea family.

In Wallis and Futuna, social and political organization is inextricably intertwined with religious beliefs and practices. Sophie Chave-Dartoen characterizes the "socio-cosmic relations among the living, the dead, the lands they inhabit, and God." Wallisian belief posits an orderly universe, wherein each entity occupies a specific place and serves a defined purpose. In Wallisian (aga'ifenua), the term "custom" encompasses the values and institutions that underpin practices, organize relationships, and facilitate adjustments. It ensures the continuity of society and the longevity of the "socio-cosmic world." The chieftaincy is entrusted with the responsibility of safeguarding this order.

The cosmic world encompasses a multitude of deities, a considerable number of whom were formerly chiefs who were subsequently deified following their demise. "The majority of these ancient deities were thus ancestral figures who presided over the lives, destinies, and well-being of their descendants." Such deities were venerated and believed to dwell in specific locations, including rocks, trees, shadows, the night, or the primeval island of Pulotu, which was considered the home of the gods. Since the arrival of European missionaries in Wallis and Futuna in the 1840s, local beliefs have been influenced by the introduction of Christianity. The former deities have been relegated to the status of demons by Christian doctrine, while the Christian God now occupies the primary position in the celestial realm. The Christian concept of Heaven has been incorporated into the Polynesian afterlife, which encompasses a diverse array of spiritual entities. These include the Christian God, the Virgin Mary, and Christ, as well as saints, ancestors, and malevolent spirits (ancestors of other groups) and the old deities. For those of Wallisian and Futunan descent, this afterlife is perceived to interact with the world of the living. Chave-Dartoen posits that for an action to be socially validated and thus effective, it must originate in the afterlife, which is now presided over by the Christian God. Its significance lies within the cosmic order, to which the living contribute and which they uphold through prohibitions and rituals.

==== Antiquity and spatio-temporal roots ====
The socio-cosmic world is structured according to the principle of antiquity, whereby the afterlife is regarded as the primary domain, with God occupying a central position of authority. Subsequently, humans are positioned within the socio-cosmic structure, with kings occupying a superior position to men and women among the living. Antiquity is a fundamental principle in social relations, wherein elders are accorded precedence over younger individuals, and the olders (matu'a) are vested with authority over the younger. Each matu'a is responsible for their household members and accountable to the king and chieftaincy. Additionally, the matu'a serves as an intermediary between ancestors and God (who oversees the matu'a's family and ensures their prosperity) and between the matu'a's descendants and those who reside with him. This intermediary role is of particular significance for chiefs. A chief's authority is contingent upon their ability to amass a substantial following, thereby establishing a relationship of mutual dependence.

An individual's position within a social structure is often contingent upon their familial and geographic origins. In this context, the rights associated with islander identity extend beyond mere legal or political boundaries. These rights encompass the transmission and fertility of the soil, a responsibility that has been entrusted to islanders by divine and ancestral forces. Moreover, these rights afford individuals access to a rich repository of names and titles that have been associated with various statuses, positions, and potential responsibilities.

==== The king's place in the socio-cosmic world ====
The Lavēua, or king of Wallis, is held in particularly high regard as the mediator between the divine and the human realms. He is regarded as the vessel of the gods and is known as the vakatapu, which translates as the "sacred/taboo canoe." This concept of the sacred (tapu) is pervasive throughout Polynesia and plays a pivotal role.

In many traditional societies, kings are regarded as divine messengers on earth. As a result, a unique language, which is akin to that used to address gods, is used to speak to them. It is tradition that the ancestral god Fakavelikele, the deity associated with warfare and regarded as the most formidable, is the originator of the inaugural royal title (sau) of Futuna. The Lavelua, even after their demise, are regarded as mystical beings. Consequently, they are all interred in the same location, Atuvalu (meaning "the eight kings aligned" in Wallisian).

Prior to the conversion of the island of Wallis to Catholicism by French missionaries, the customary kings held absolute authority. The sovereign was vested with the right of life and death over his subjects. His person was considered sacred, and no individual was permitted to approach him or assume a position of superiority over him.

=== Customary ceremonies ===
In both Wallis and Futuna, the customary kings are known as the aga'ifenua. They serve as representatives of tradition, bearing the responsibility to preserve local customs and cultures, as well as to preside over every ceremony. Customary values and social hierarchy are particularly expressed through numerous customary festivals (such as the katoaga).

==== Katoaga ====
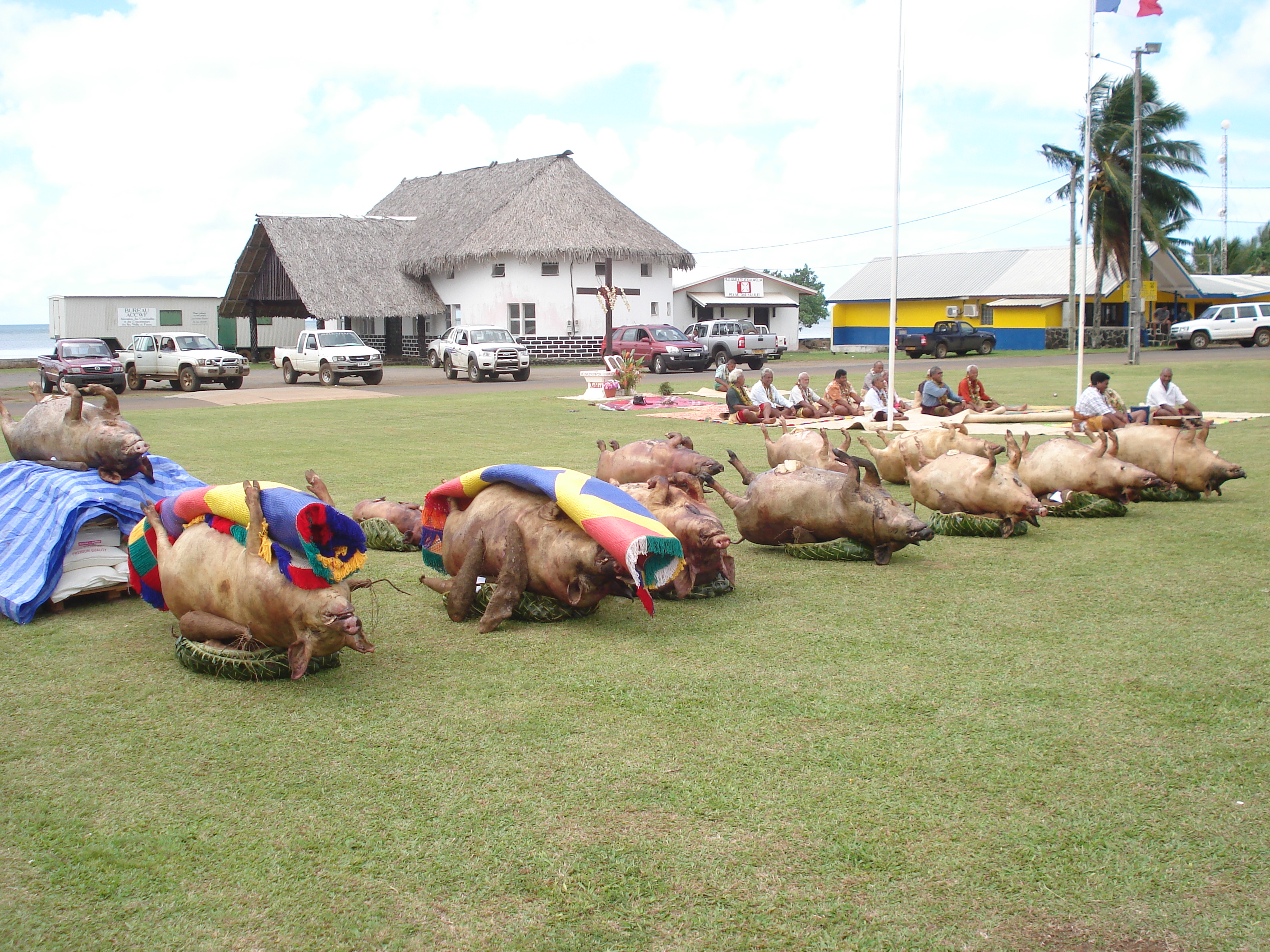
Pigs and mats laid out on the ground in front of the Uvea royal palace during a katoaga, a customary festival, in 2008.

The Katoaga is one of the primary customary festivals observed by the occurrences throughout the year. During these ceremonies, pigs, vegetables (yam, taro), mats, and other goods are presented as offerings to the king and the entire chieftaincy by the people. Additionally, dances are performed by various villages during these festivities. The Katoaga also encompasses a kava ceremony, conducted in strict accordance with protocol, where the king holds the highest rank in the hierarchy.

The Katoaga system serves to reinforce the existing social hierarchy, with the king occupying a position of paramount authority. "The king, as the encompassing principle of all, is the supreme guarantor of both social order and the fertility of nature." The kava and the katoaga ceremonies exemplify the "cosmological" essence of royalty, as postulated by Marshall Sahlins. In Polynesian culture, the well-being of the populace, the longevity of the monarch, and the harmonious interplay of cosmic forces are inextricably linked. Consequently, in the absence of a reigning monarch, or in the event of their inability to attend, this ceremony cannot be conducted.

===== Fai Ofa =====
The Fai Ofa, held annually at the end of the year, is one of the most significant ceremonies. This ceremony, observed particularly in Uvea, requires those who support the king to present him with gifts as a gesture of gratitude and apology for the past year. This ceremony, which is deeply rooted in tradition, provides an opportunity for reflection on the past year. It is attended by high-ranking chiefs and district leaders and serves as a significant event in the local tradition. Additionally, it provides a forum for residents to convey their aspirations to the monarch for the forthcoming year. Each member of the chieftaincy, under the guidance of the monarch, articulates their aspirations before the populace.

== The three kingdoms and the list of monarchs ==
=== Subdivisions of the kingdoms ===
The kingdoms, referred to as pule'aga sau in Futunan and translating to "domain of the king", are distributed across the same territory in a configuration that is distinctive both within the context of Oceania and in comparison to the French system, where territories are typically divided into communes rather than kingdoms.

The Wallis and Futuna Islands are a single kingdom, Uvea, which encompasses the entire island of Uvea. However, for the purpose of maintaining proximity to the populace, the kingdom is divided into three districts. The smaller island of Futuna is divided into two kingdoms, Alo and Sigave. When combined, the three islands—Wallis, Futuna, and Alofi—cover an area of 149 km^{2}.

Map of the island of Wallis, which includes the kingdom of Uvea, divided into three districts.

==== Uvea ====
The Kingdom of Uvea encompasses the entire Wallis Island, which has a total area of 96 square kilometers. The kingdom has been under the leadership of customary king Patalione Kanimoa since April 14, 2016. The Royal Palace of Uvea is situated in Mata Utu, the most populous town in Wallis and Futuna, with a population of 1,029. The title held by the monarch of this kingdom is Lavelua. The Prime Minister, Mikaele Halagahu, has held the title of Kalae Kivalu since 2017. The kingdom comprises 21 villages and three districts: Hihifo, Hahake, and Mu'a. In 2018, the kingdom of Uvea had a population of 8,833, making it the most populated kingdom in Wallis and Futuna.

Map of Futuna and Alofi islands, including Sigave and Alo.

==== Alo ====
The Kingdom of Alo is situated in the southeastern region of Futuna Island and encompasses the island of Alofi, situated approximately 230 kilometers from Wallis and Futuna. The territory encompasses an area of 53 square kilometers and has been under the leadership of customary king Lino Leleivai since November 30, 2018. The royal palace of Alo is located in Ono, the capital city. The title held by the sovereign of this kingdom is Tu'i Agaifo. The Prime Minister, appointed in 2019, is Petelo Ekeni Vaitanaki. The kingdom comprises nine villages. In 2018, the kingdom of Alo had approximately 1,950 inhabitants. The villages of Alofitai and Tuatafa have populations of one and two residents, respectively, and are therefore the least populated villages in Wallis and Futuna.

==== Sigave ====
The kingdom of Sigave is situated in the northwest of Futuna Island. The territory encompasses an area of 21 km^{2} and has been under the leadership of customary king Eufenio Takala since March 1, 2016. The royal palace of Sigave is situated in Leava, the capital. The title held by the sovereign of this kingdom is Tu'i Sigave. The Prime Minister, appointed in 2019, is Emiliano Keletaona. The kingdom comprises six villages. In 2018, the kingdom of Sigave had a total population of 1,275, making it the smallest kingdom in terms of population.

=== List of kings by kingdom ===
Lavelua since 1767
Name	Reign start	Reign end	Notes
Manuka	1767	1810	
Tufele I	1810	1818	
Kulitea	1818	1819	
Lavekava	1819	1819	
Hiva	1820	1820	
Muliakaaka	1820	1825	
Uhilamoafa	1825	1825	
Toifale	1825	1829	She was the first woman to become Queen of Wallis. During her reign, she welcomed the first Europeans who landed on Wallis in 1825.
Mulitoto	1829	1829	
Takala	1829	1830	He takes advantage of the arrival of a Hawaiian merchant, George Marina (Siaosi Manini), to challenge royal authority and become king.
Soane-Patita Vaimua Lavelua	1830	1858	First sovereign to be baptized Catholic, following the evangelization of the population by Marist missionaries in 1837.
Falakika Seilala	1858	February 19, 1869	The second woman to become Lavelua, she introduced this customary title to designate the king or queen of Uvea.
Amelia Tokagahahau Aliki	February 1869	March 10, 1895	In particular, the Queen negotiated the protectorate of Wallis and Futuna and introduced the Code Bataillon.
Isaake (Note: Roux 1995, pp. 121–122)	March 11, 1895	March 12, 1895	In rebellion, his reign lasted just one day; in fact, he was the Lavelua with the shortest reign.
Vito Lavelua II	March 11, 1895	January 16, 1904	After his death, the succession provoked a political crisis known as the customary crisis.
Lusiano Aisake	August 1904	September 7, 1906	The king was hardly appreciated by the French residents who had succeeded him on the island. He was deemed "not very favorable to the island's whites."
Sosefo Mautāmakia I	1906	April 1, 1910	His arrival in power marked the end of a period (1829–1906) during which "Wallis had known only five kings or queens, all of whom reigned until their death."
Soane-Patita Lavuia	May 1910	November 30, 1916	The reign is disrupted by a dispute between Father Barzin, the French resident and the customary king.
Sosefo Mautāmakia II	1916	1918	He was deposed by his customary ministers after two years of reign.
Vitolo Kulihaapai	1918	November 2, 1924	
Tomasi Kulimoetoke I	November 3, 1924	December 9, 1928	
Mikaele Tufele II	December 21, 1928	July 26, 1931	First reign.
Sosefo Mautāmakia I	July 27, 1931	March 10, 1933	During his reign, Wallisian coconut plantations were ravaged by the oryctes rhinoceros parasite. (Note: Poncet 2013, pp. 103–114)
Petelo Kahofuna	March 13, 1933	May 23, 1933	
Mikaele Tufele II	May 25, 1933	November 30, 1933	Second reign.
Vacant from November 1933 to March 1941
Leone Manikitoga	March 16, 1941	March 20, 1947	King during World War II and the occupation of Wallis by American troops (1942–1944).
Pelenato Fuluhea	May 9, 1947	April 10, 1950	New, more equitable distribution of the six customary ministers of Lavelua among the three districts of Wallis.
Kapeliele Tufele III	April 25, 1950	November 17, 1953	A reign marked in particular by a bad understanding with the island's senior administrator, who tried to have him deposed.
Aloisia Brial	December 22, 1953	September 12, 1958	The queen was judged too authoritarian and challenged by Tomasi Kulimoetoke, Pelenato Fuluhea and the French resident. She eventually abdicated.
Vacant September 12, 1958 to March 12, 1959.
Tomasi Kulimoetoke II	March 12, 1959	May 7, 2007	Longest reign as King of Uvea (48 years). His succession triggered a Wallisian customary crisis in 2005.
Vacant from May 8, 2007 to June 25, 2008.
Kapeliele Faupala	July 25, 2008	September 4, 2014	Mini-Pacific Games held for the first time in Wallis.
Vacant from September 2, 2014 to April 14, 2016.
Tominiko Halagahu	April 15, 2016	Incumbent	Not recognized by the French state.
Patalione Kanimoa	April 17, 2016	Incumbent	Recognized by the State on June 3, 2016 following the enthronement of two kings Patalione Kanimoa and Tominiko Halagahu, a first for Wallis.

Tu'i Agaifo since 1958
Name	Reign start	Reign end	Notes
Petelo Maituku	?	December 27, 1958	
Setefano Tuikalepa	December 29, 1958	February 8, 1960	
Kamaliele Moefana	February 9, 1960	December 9, 1961	
Pio Tagatamanogi	December 28, 1961	September 8, 1962	
Mikaele Fanene	September 15, 1962	October 1968	
Seteone Pipisega	November 1968	May 30, 1970	
Petelo Maituku	June 1, 1970	May 1, 1973	
Mikaele Katea	May 10, 1973	April 17, 1974	
Patita Savea	April 20, 1974	December 28, 1976	
Kalepo Nau	January 11, 1977	July 17, 1978	
Nopeleto Tuikalepa	March 15, 1979	October 29, 1984	
Petelo Lemo	November 20, 1984	February 24, 1990	
Lomano Musulamu	February 24, 1990	February 1, 1995	
Esipio Takasi	April 6, 1995	July 9, 1997	
Sagato Alofi	July 10, 1997	October 2002	Death in service.
Soane Patita Maituku	November 21, 2002	February 19, 2008	He was deposed in February 2008 following a unanimous discussion among the kingdom's four clans.
Petelo Vikena	November 6, 2008	January 22, 2010	He was deposed because his coronation was not the result of a consensus among the chiefdoms and royal clans, but a unilateral decision by the council of chiefs.
Vacant from January 22, 2010 to January 17, 2014.
Petelo Sea	January 17, 2014	May 14, 2016	He is the only king to have been made a chevalier of the Ordre national du Mérite. He received this honor in February 2016 from François Hollande.
Filipo Katoa	June 7, 2016	October 3, 2018	The king decides to abdicate for health reasons.
Lino Leleivai	November 29, 2018	Incumbent	

Tu'i Sigave since 1955
Name	Reign start	Reign end	Notes
Sam Keletaona	1942	1951	Following the Vai War, Sam Keletaona became king of the entire island of Futuna (both Sigave and Alo). Later, with the loss of power, he became king of Sigave.
Sakopo Tamole	July 11, 1955	January 18, 1957	
Setefano Lavelua	January 27, 1957	August 4, 1959	
Sileno Tamole	September 29, 1959	April 7, 1969	
Alefosio Keletaona	July 31, 1969	May 24, 1971	
Ilalio Amosala	June 1, 1971	September 30, 1972	
Nasalio Keletaona	December 1, 1972	August 1982	He belonged to both the Keletaona and Safoka clans. This alliance enabled him to accede to the throne.
Sagato Keletaona	August 4, 1982	April 1, 1987	He was a member of the Keletaona clan. His opponent and successor, Sosefo Vanai, succeeded in having him deposed for mismanagement of funds sent by the State following Cyclone Raja in December 1986.
Sosefo Vanai	April 1, 1987	April 5, 1989	He was a member of the Tamole clan, which groups together all the descendants of Vanai, King of Sigave killed during the Vai War.
Lafaele Mala	May 1989	October 26, 1992	Safoka clan.
Soane Patia Sokautaua	October 26, 1992	September 26, 1998	Tiaina clan.
Pasilio Keletaona	September 10, 1998	September 2003	Keletaona clan.
Visesio Moeliku	March 3, 2004	August 3, 2009	Visesio Moeliku abdicated on August 3, 2009, and the Sigave throne remained vacant for over a year following disagreements among the chieftains to elect a new ruler.
Vacant from August 2009 to July 2010.
Polikalepo Kolivai	July 24, 2010	October 5, 2014	
Vacant from October 2014 to March 2016.
Eufenio Takala	March 5, 2016	Incumbent	Keletaona clan.

== Gallery ==
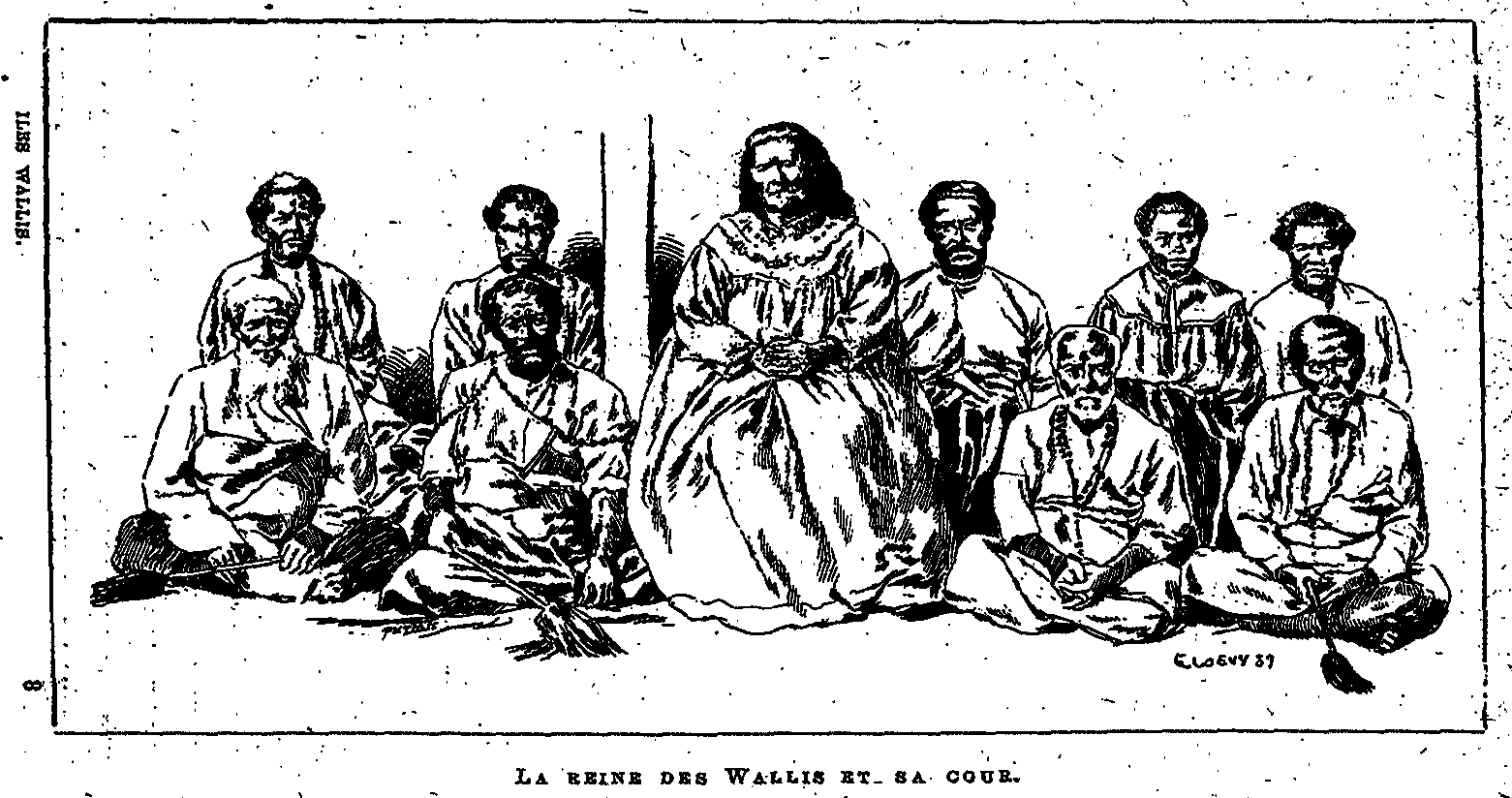
Engraving showing Amelia Tokagahahau Aliki (middle) and her court (1839).

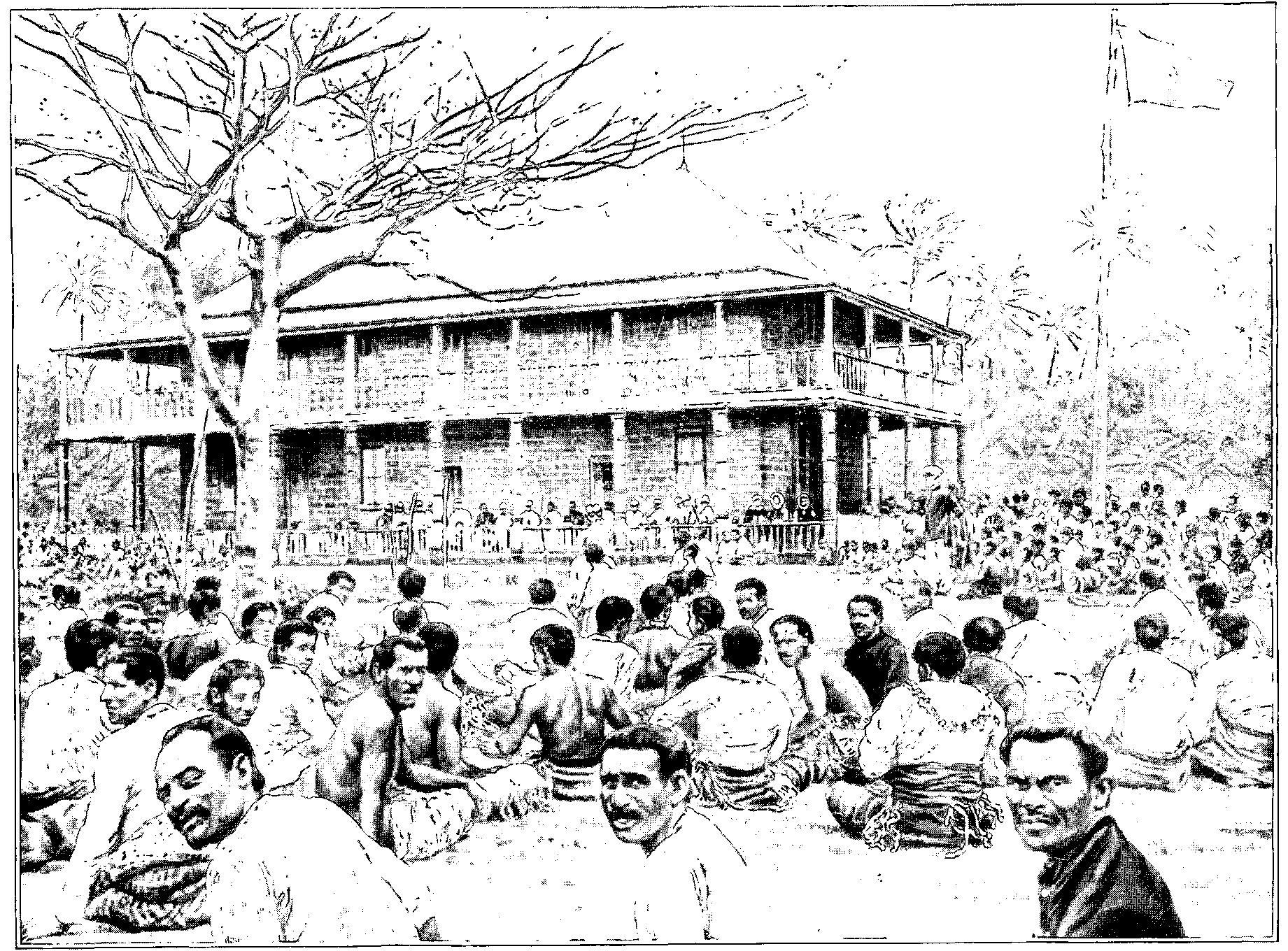
Engraving showing the Royal Palace of Uvea (in 1900).

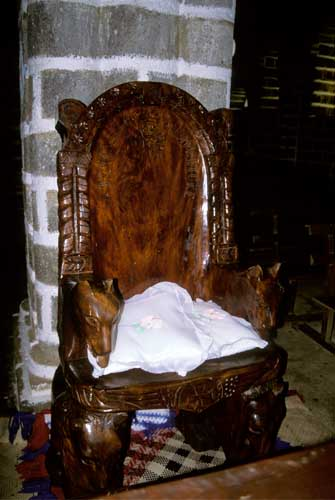
The Uvea royal throne in the palace.

== See also ==
- Monarchies in Oceania
- Royal Palace of Uvea
- Customary kingdoms of Wallis and Futuna
- Justice in Wallis and Futuna

== Bibliography ==
- Chave-Dartoen, Sophie (2017). Royauté, chefferie et monde socio-cosmique à Wallis ('Uvea) : Dynamiques sociales et pérennité des institutions [Royalty, chieftaincy and the socio-cosmic world of Wallis ('Uvea): Social dynamics and institutional durability] (in French). Marseille: Pacific-credo Publications. ISBN 978-2-9537485-6-7. Archived from the original on February 27, 2023.
- Chave‑Dartoen, Sophie (2017). "Le sang et le travail : aux sources de l'autorité dans le royaume de Wallis" [Blood and work: the sources of authority in the kingdom of Wallis]. Autorité et Pouvoir en perspective comparative [Authority and Power in Comparative Perspective]. TransAireS (in French). Presses de l’Inalco. ISBN 978-2-85831-249-8. Archived from the original on November 1, 2023.
- Vienne, Bernard; Frimigacci, Daniel (2006). "Les fondations du royaume de 'Uvea : une histoire à revisiter" [The foundations of the kingdom of 'Uvea: a history worth revisiting]. Journal de la Société des Océanistes (in French) (122–123): 27–60. doi:10.4000/jso.529. Archived from the original on May 28, 2024.
- Roux, Jean-Claude (1995). Wallis et Futuna : Espaces et temps recomposés. Chroniques d'une micro-insularité [Wallis and Futuna: Recomposed spaces and times. Chronicles of a micro-insularity] (PDF) (in French). Talence: Presses universitaires de Bordeaux. ISBN 2-905081-29-5. Archived from the original (PDF) on December 7, 2022.
- Huffer, Élise; Leleivai, Petelo (2001). Aux deux royaumes [To the two kingdoms] (in French). Futuna: Institut des Affaires Culturelles de Futuna. ISBN 978-982-02-0316-7. Archived from the original on November 6, 2024.
- Angleviel, Frédéric (2006). "Wallis-et-Futuna (1942–1961) ou comment le fait migratoire transforma le protectorat en TOM" [Wallis and Futuna (1942–1961) or how migration transformed the protectorate into a French overseas territory]. Journal de la Société des Océanistes (in French) (122–123): 61–76. doi:10.4000/jso.541. Archived from the original on February 23, 2024.
- Douaire‑Marsaudon, Françoise (2018). "Droit coutumier et loi républicaine dans une collectivité d'outre‑mer française (Wallis‑et‑Futuna)" [Customary law and republican law in a French overseas collectivity (Wallis and Futuna)]. Ethnologie française (in French). 169 (1): 81–92. doi:10.3917/ethn.181.0081. ISSN 0046-2616. Archived from the original on September 5, 2024.
- Frimigacci; Siorat; Vienne (1988). Généalogies du royaume d'Alo et de Sigave [Genealogies of the kingdom of Alo and Sigave] (PDF) (in French). Archived from the original (PDF) on November 1, 2023.
- Frimigacci, Daniel (2000). "La préhistoire d'Uvea (Wallis). Chronologie et périodisation" [The prehistory of Uvea (Wallis). Chronology and periodization]. Journal de la Société des Océanistes (in French). 111 (2): 135–163. doi:10.3406/jso.2000.2131. Archived from the original on November 1, 2023.
- Favole, Adriano (2000). "La royauté oscillante. Ethnographie et histoire de la cérémonie d'investiture du Tu'i Agaifo d'Alo (Futuna)" [Oscillating royalty. Ethnography and history of the investiture ceremony of the Tu'i Agaifo of Alo (Futuna)]. Journal de la Société des Océanistes (in French). 111 (2). Marseille: 195–218. doi:10.3406/jso.2000.2134. Archived from the original on June 15, 2024.
