= Mautāmakia =

Mautāmakia is a surname. Notable people with the surname include:

- Sosefo Mautāmakia I (died 1933), king of Uvea
- Sosefo Mautāmakia II (r. 1916–1918), king of Uvea
