= Isaake =

Isaake was a king of Uvea, ruling in rebellion for one day in 1895. His father, Pooi, was a cousin of Soane-Patita Vaimua Lavelua. Following the death of Amelia Tokagahahau Aliki the fono elected Vito Lavelua II by six votes out of seven, but Isaake refused to accept the decision and gathered a group of armed followers. The next day, following a brief standoff, Vito declared that he had no desire to reign, after which Isaake ordered his men to lay down their arms and gifted his land and the kingship to Vito.
