= Tufele =

Tufele is a surname. Notable people with the surname include:

- Tufele Liamatua, American Samoan politician
- Kapeliele Tufele III, King of Uvea 1950-1953
- Mikaele Tufele II, King of Uvea 1928-1931
- Jay Tufele (born 1999), American football player
