= Pelenato Fuluhea =

King of Uvea from 1947 to 1950

Member of the Territorial Assembly of Wallis and Futuna
- In office 4 March 1962 – 8 July 1970
- Succeeded by: Alikisio Liufau
- Constituency: Mu'a

Faipule of Mu'a
- In office 1962–1964
- Preceded by: Automalo Manuka

Faipule of Mu'a
- In office 1 January 1953 – 8 June 1961
- Preceded by: Apalahamo Vakalepu
- Succeeded by: Automalo Manuka

Faipule of Mu'a
- In office 1942–1947
- Succeeded by: Apalahamo Vakalepu

King of Uvea
- In office 9 June 1947 – 11 April 1950
- Preceded by: Leone Manikitoga
- Succeeded by: Kapeliele Tufele III

Siuafu of Halalo
- In office 1939–1942

Personal details
- Born: 1903 Halalo, Uvea
- Died: 8 July 1970 (aged 66–67)

Pelenato Fuluhea, known as Pulufegu, born in 1903 and died on 8 July 1970, was a customary ruler (King) of Uvea who reigned from 9 June 1947 to 11 April 1950, a period marked by profound social and economic change following the American presence during the Second World War. Customary conflicts reflecting the island's social divisions led to his removal. After his reign, he served as district chief (faipule) of Mu'a from 1953 to 1961 and again from 1962 to 1964. Between 1957 and 1959, he supported the future Lavelua Tomasi Kulimoetoke II against Queen Aloisia Brial.

== Early life ==
Pelenato Fuluhea was born in Halalo, in the district of Mu'a. He was the Siafu (village chief) of his native village from 1939 to 1942. In 1943, during the Second World War, he was placed in charge of the first contingent of 178 Wallisians and Futunans sent to New Caledonia to replace workers who had gone to the front. These workers requested repatriation after a few months, judging that their working and pay conditions did not match what had been promised to them.

== Reign (1947–1950) ==
Pelenato Fuluhea became King of Uvea during a period of political instability, following a brief but strong period of economic prosperity brought about by the American presence in Wallis during the Second World War and the weakening of both the French administration (Protectorate of Wallis and Futuna) and the Catholic mission. According to Jean-Claude Roux, the Wallisian monarchy entered a period of "chronic instability" beginning with his reign.

On 25 March 1946, a lieutenant of the United States Army, Zincheck, together with deposed customary ministers, submitted a request for the annexation of Wallis and Futuna by the United States. The French resident, Charbonnier, secured the withdrawal of the request and the departure of the lieutenant. The supporters of American annexation having been defeated, their leaders were exiled to New Caledonia, and the Lavelua Leone Manikitoga abdicated the following year, in April 1947. On 9 June 1947, Pelenato Fuluhea succeeded him and became King of Uvea. The resident, Marcel Alexandre Chomet, approved his appointment, describing him as "energetic and pro-French".

During his reign, the emigration of Wallisian and Futunan workers to New Caledonia became established. He regulated departures, setting wage requirements, demanding a bonus for kings and customary chiefs, and limiting work contracts to a maximum of three years.

He also introduced an equal distribution of the Lavelua's six customary ministers among the three districts of Wallis: "Kivalu, Fotuatamai and Pulu'i'Uvea were chosen in Hahake; Mahe and Mukoi fenua in Mu'a; Kulitea and ’Ulu’i Monua in Hihifo". This measure aimed to limit the influence of the district of Hahake, which up to that point had been the dominant district, from which the majority of Wallisian kings originated and over which it exerted authority over the rest of the island.

New customary disputes arose in April 1950, reflecting the social tensions of the period: the authoritarianism of certain officials, the generational divide within the local clergy, and the return of Wallisians influenced by "trade union" ideas. The Lavelua faced opposition mainly from the district of Hihifo, whose residents complained that mandatory collective labour (fatogia) went unpaid. These conflicts led to Pelenato Fuluhea's abdication on 11 April, and the election of Victor-Emmanuel Brial two days later. However, as Brial was a French citizen and the island's leading merchant, he did not receive the approval of either the Catholic mission or the administration, and it was Kapeliele Tufele III who was ultimately chosen as the next sovereign, on 17 April 1950.

== Political career after his reign ==
Pelenato Fuluhea became district chief of Mu'a on 1 January 1953, against the wishes of the Lavelua Kapeliele Tufele. He held this role until 1961, and again from 1962 to 1964.

In 1957, Pelenato Fuluhea supported Tomasi Kulimoetoke II in his conflict with Queen Aloisia Brial. The queen, elderly and considered authoritarian, faced growing opposition from the royal families. Pelenato Fuluhea led the opposition, alongside two other kings, Kapeliele Tufele III and Leone Manikitoga. Tomasi Kulimoetoke decided to depose the queen, but the French resident refused to accept her removal. The crisis intensified, and Fuluhea joined Kulimoetoke in working to bring down the queen.

A new resident, Pierre Fauché, arrived in Wallis on 3 August 1958. This was a period of intense social and economic change for the territory; the protectorate of Wallis and Futuna was drawing to a close and negotiations were underway for the drafting of a new statute. However, Queen Aloisia Brial categorically refused the change of status and would not agree to cede the Hihifo airfield for the construction of an airport. The resident decided to ally with Tomasi Kulimoetoke and Pelenato Fuluhea to secure the queen's abdication. The two men gathered growing support; Pelenato Fuluhea in particular rallied all the villages of his district of Mu'a. Several of the queen's ministers stopped receiving their allowance, while Kulimoetoke and Fuluhea were paid by the French administration. Discussions followed among the royal families for six months, and on 12 March 1959, Tomasi Kulimoetoke became Lavelua.

In 1959, Pelenato Fuluhea led negotiations on the change of status of Wallis and Futuna with customary authorities and members of the community in Nouméa, including Sosefo Makape Papilio. At the celebrations of 14 July 1959, he formally presented President Charles de Gaulle with a letter from the three customary kings requesting the formation, with France, of "a spiritual, political and economic community, as well as a community of interests", while preserving the Catholic religion and the prerogatives of customary institutions. In December of that year, a referendum was held on the change of status, approved by 94%, and Wallis and Futuna became a French overseas territory.

Pelenato Fuluhea sat in the new territorial assembly of Wallis and Futuna in 1962 and again in 1967, for the district of Mu'a.

He died on 8 July 1970. He was succeeded at the territorial assembly by Alikisio Liufau.

== Legacy ==
In 2013, a statue honouring him was erected in Halalo, in the south of the island of Uvea.

== See also ==
- Customary kings of Wallis and Futuna
- Uvea
- Lavelua
- History of Wallis and Futuna
- Protectorate of Wallis and Futuna
- 1959 Wallis and Futuna status referendum
