= Soan =

Soan or Soans may refer to:

- Soan (singer), French singer, winner of Nouvelle Star
- Soan River, a river in Punjab, Pakistan
- Soan Sakaser Valley, a valley in northern Punjab, Pakistan
- Soan industry, a crude pebble industry of the Paleolithic.

== Given name / family name ==
- Ash Soan, a British drummer

== See also ==
- Soane (disambiguation)
