= Falakika Seilala =

Falakika Seilala (died 20 February 1869), was a Queen of Uvea, ruling from 1858 until 1869. She introduced the title Lavelua for all the kings and queens of Uvea. She succeeded her brother Soane-Patita Vaimua Lavelua, and was succeeded by her paternal niece Amelia Tokagahahau Aliki.

== Biography ==
A member of the Takumasiva dynasty, she acceded to the throne on 5 December 1858, a few weeks after the death of her brother Soane-Patita Vaimua Lavelua, who chose her to succeed him. The Catholic mission played an important role in her nomination, with Jean-Claude Roux saying they "pushed [her] to the throne".

In 1859, she encountered difficulties with a French merchant, who had to leave Wallis.

Her coming to power revived conflicts between Catholics and Protestants, converted by Wesleyan missionaries (Methodists) from Tonga. Thus, in 1866, she refused to grant the islanders religious freedom, as requested by the captain of a Royal Navy ship who had come to support the Protestants, and also refused the request of a Wesleyan pastor the following year.

Her niece Amelia Tokagahahau Aliki succeeded her on February 19, 1869 and she died the next day.

== Comparison with other sovereigns of Oceania ==
Falakika Seilala was the first Wallisian sovereign to introduce the name Lavelua as a royal title. She is one of four women to have held royal office in Uvea, along with Toifale, Amelia Tokagahahau Aliki and Aloisia Brial. She also fits among other queens of Polynesia, such as Salote Tupou III in Tonga (1918-1965), Liliʻuokalani in Hawaii (1891-1893) or Pōmare IV in Tahiti (1827-1877).
