= Soane =

Soane is the name of:

== Surname ==
- Bryan Soane (born 1988), Australian footballer
- George Soane (1790–1860), English writer and dramatist
- Henry Soane (1622–1661), Virginia politician and landowner
- John Soane (1753–1837), English architect and collector
- Stuart Soane (born 1987), Scottish footballer
- Soane (1790s cricketer) (born c. 1770), an English cricketer active in the 1790s

== Given name ==
Soane is a Tongan given name, equivalent to the English given name John

- Soane Asi (born 1963), Tongan former rugby union player
- Soane Havea (born 1981), Tongan rugby union player
- Soane Lilo Foliaki (1933–2013), Roman Catholic bishop of Tonga
- Soane-Patita Lavuia, king of Wallis Island from 1910 until 1916
- Soane Patita Maituku (born 1947), Tu'i Agaifo of Alo, Tonga
- Soane Patita Paini Mafi (born 1961), Roman Catholic Bishop of Tonga
- Soane Toke, king of Wallis Island for one day in 1953
- Soane Tongaʻuiha (born 1982), Tongan rugby union player

== See also ==
- Sir John Soane's Museum, London
- Zeb Soanes (born 1976)
- Soane Monument
