= Vitolo =

Vitolo may refer to:

- Vitolo (footballer, born 1983) (Víctor José Añino Bermúdez), Spanish footballer
- Vitolo (footballer, born 1989) (Víctor Machín Pérez), Spanish footballer
- Dennis Vitolo (born 1956), American racing driver
- Tommy Vitolo (born 1978), American politician
- Vitolo Kulihaapai, King of Uvea from 1918 to 1924
