= Muliakaaka =

Muliakaaka was a king of Uvea, ruling from 1820 to 1825. He was the first king of the Second Takumasiva Dynasty. He was preceded by Hiva from the Kulitea Dynasty, and succeeded by Uhilamoafa.
