= Polikalepo Kolivai =

King of Sigave

Polikalepo Kolivai (born 31 August 1939) was crowned as sau (translated by the French as "king") of Sigavé in July 2010. His appointment was not recognised by other clans, and he was recognised by only a few villages before retiring. When Eufenio Takala was crowned in 2016 the throne was said to have been vacant for seven years.

== See also ==
- List of kings of Sigave
- Monarchies in Oceania
