= Soane Toke =

Former king of Uvea

Soane Toke was a king of Uvea (Wallis island, South Pacific), ruling for one day on 11 December 1953. He was preceded by Kapeliele Tufele III, and succeeded by Aloisia Brial.

After the resignation of Kapeliele Tufele III on 13 November 1953, negotiations were difficult to choose the new king of Wallis. After Emmanuel Brial refused to be chosen, the royal family revoked the customary ministers and nominated new ones who elected Soane Toke, chief of the Hihifo district, as the new lavelua on 11 December. The very same day, a simple kava ceremony was held in Mata-Utu to officially install Soane Toke's nomination. However, the ceremony was interrupted by angry villagers from Ha'afusia and Falaleu who forced Soane Toke to resign immediately.

Aloisia Brial was eventually elected queen of Uvea on 22 December 1953, ending the succession crisis.
