= Uhilamoafa =

King of Uvea

Uhilamoafa was a king of Uvea who ruled before 1825. He was appointed following the assassination of Muliakaaka, but died of natural causes soon afterwards. He was succeeded by Toifale.
