= Mulitoto =

King of Uvea

King of Uvea
- Reign: 1829
- Predecessor: Toifale
- Successor: Soane-Patita Vaimua Lavelua

Mulitoto was a King of Uvea, who reigned for less than a year in 1829. He was preceded by Toifale. He lived in Ha'afuasia. Very old, he died during the year of his reign and was buried in Tokatafa. He was succeeded by Soane-Patita Vaimua Lavelua.
