= Takala =

Takala (died June 1832) was a Wallisian customary chief of the Mua District who ruled as King of Uvea from 1831 to 1832. A descendant of King Vehi'ika, he took advantage of the arrival of a Hawaiian merchant, Siaosi Manini, to overthrow king Soane-Patita Vaimua Lavelua. After Manini's defeat at the end of January 1832, he lost his title. He died a few months later after another violent altercation with British and American sailors.

== Background ==
Takala was a chief of the Mua District and a son of King Vehi'ika. Firmly established in the south of Wallis, he was a competitor of the Takumasiva lineage, established in Hahake. He lived in Matagaika, located in the current village of Lavegahau. His rival, Soane-Patita Vaimua Lavelua I, was named king around 1828.

== Accession to power ==
In 1829, a mixed-Spanish Hawaiian trader, Siaosi Manini, landed in the south of Wallis to fish for sea cucumbers. Manini had previously played a role in chieftaincy wars in Fiji and Samoa by selling guns to rival chieftains and was described as having "Napoleonic" ambitions. He married Takala's daughter.

In 1830, Takala and several Wallisians traveled with Manini to Hawaii, where the merchant recruited a crew to fish for beche-de-mer. According to Hawaiian historian Samuel Kamakau, this was the first time Wallisians were seen in Hawaii. Takala returned to Wallis at the beginning of 1831, to the Nukuatea islet which he sold to Manini in exchange for a variety of trade goods (knives, axes, fabrics and other miscellaneous objects). Manini and his Hawaiian crew set up a large house on the islet, a workshop for preparing sea cucumbers and around thirty huts to house the workers. A fort with nine guns was also erected. "From then on, the Europeans considered themselves owners of the island in Western fashion and tried to reserve its use to themselves. However, this mode of exclusive possession does not exist in traditional Wallisian society and altercations begin". The situation quickly degenerated into an armed conflict. This episode is known in Uvean history as Te tau vaihi (the Hawaiian War).

Marina and his men, supported by Takala, attacked the royal residence of Soane-Patita Vaimua Lavelua I, causing several deaths. Takala's goal was to restore his lineage to supremacy over the nobles of Hahake. Takala won, and Vaimu'a was captured and held prisoner in Mu'a. Takala was named Lavelua and "the aristocrats of Hahake [ were ] humiliated and reduced to servitude" . The reign (qualified by Sophia Chave-Dartoen as a "usurpation" ) came at an unstable period when the nobles of Hahake were consolidating their hegemony.

== Fall and death ==
Siaosi Manini imposed forced labor and the Wallisian population did not accept his authority. Vaimua Takumasiva becomes King of Wallis again. At the end of January 1832, Manini was assassinated and a large part of the Hawaiians were massacred. Takala was exiled to the north of Wallis.

A few months later, a new massacre took place. On March 26, 1832, the British whaler Holdham anchored in Wallis. In response to the theft of sailors' clothes by the Wallisians, the crewmen looted the village of Fagatoto and violently attacked the inhabitants. Moreover, the captain, under the influence of alcohol, announced that he wanted to kill the king. These assaults lead to revenge from Takala and his men, who attacked the ship on April 12: armed with axes and firearms, they killed almost all of Holdham 's sailors. The next day, an American ship discovered the killing and warned a British warship, HMS Zebra. This sloop arrived at 'Uvea in June 1832 and soon an exchange of fire took place. Takala died in the ensuing battle.
