= Lusiano Aisake =

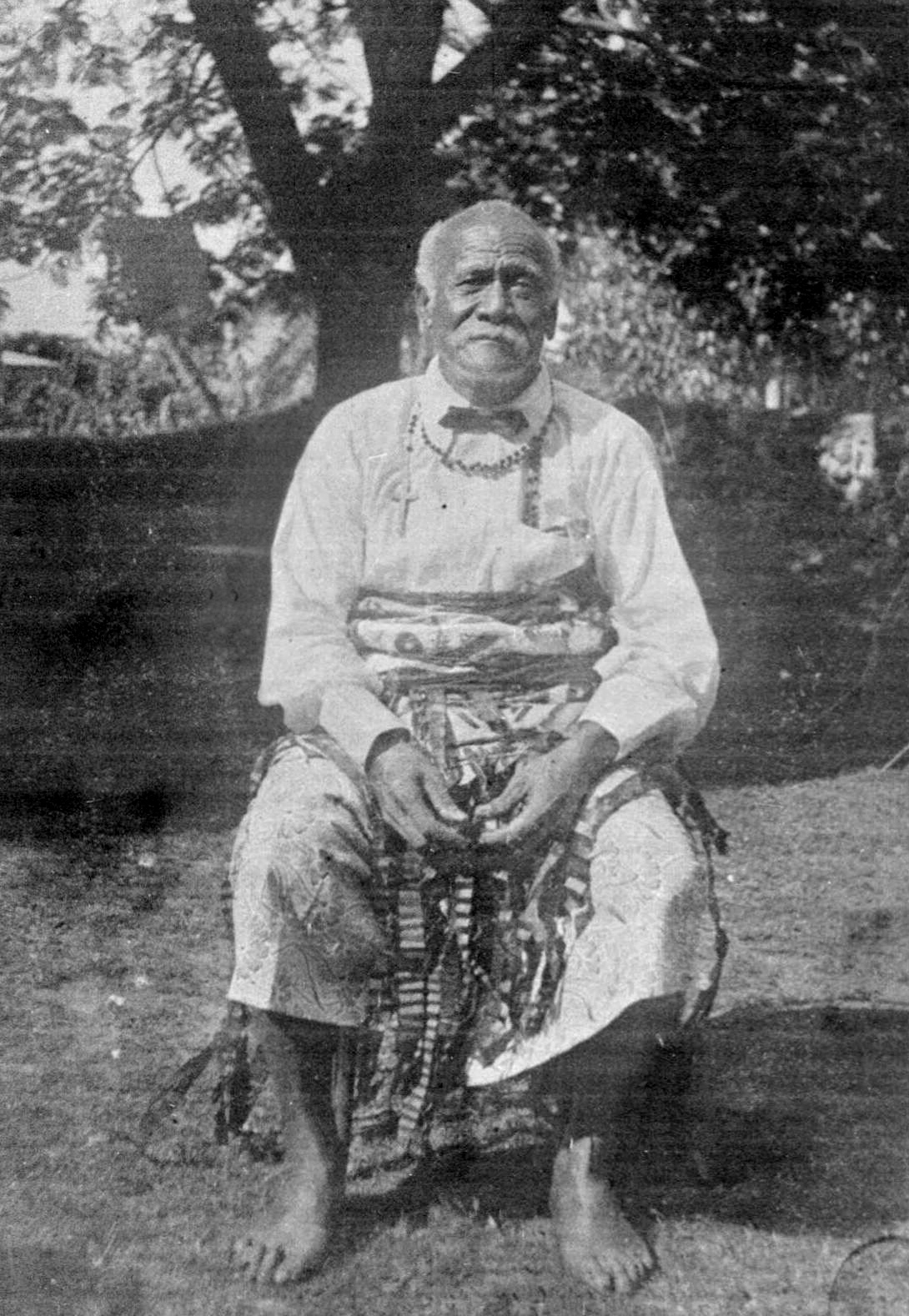
Lusiano Aisake in 1904 (photo by Victor Segalen)

Lusiano Aisake (died 7 September 1906) was a king of Uvea, who ruled from 1904 until 1906. He came to power after Vito Lavelua II in August 1904 when he was around 65 years old.

According to Jean-Claude Roux, Lusiano Aisake was the “favorite of the resident Chauvot, but elected against the advice of the resident De Keroman”. The French captain Adigart, commanding the aviso Protet which passed through Wallis in October 1904, judged him "unfavorable to the whites of the island". The resident Viala judged him very negatively, "with a suspicious and authoritarian behavior".

Aisake rules for two years; he died on 7 September 1906. One of his fourth cousins, Sosefo Mautāmakia I, succeeded him.
