= Petelo Kahofuna =

Petelo Kahofuna was a king of Uvea, ruling briefly in 1933. He was preceded by Sosefo Mautāmakia I, and succeeded by Mikaele Tufele II.

Following the death of Sosefo Mautāmakia I he was elected king on March 13 1933. However, the French colonial administration refused to recognise his election. On 23 May a French warship arrived carrying the remains of Sosefo, as well as Mukoi, one of Sosefo's ministers. Kahofuna was informed that he was dismissed as king. On 25 May, following Sosefo's funeral, Mikaele Tufele II was again elected as king.
