= List of kings of Uvea =

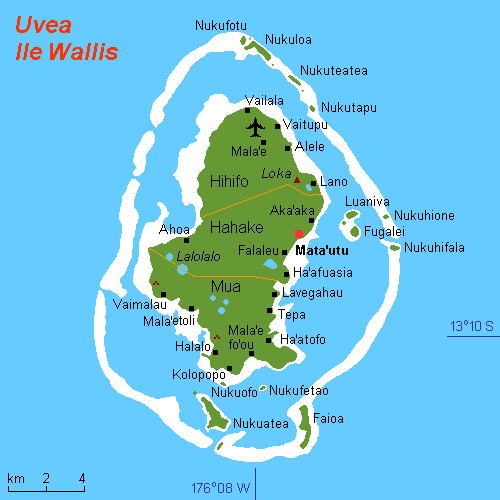
Map of Wallis Island, also called Uvea. The traditional kingdom comprises the entire island.

Flag of Uvea.

Seal of Uvea.

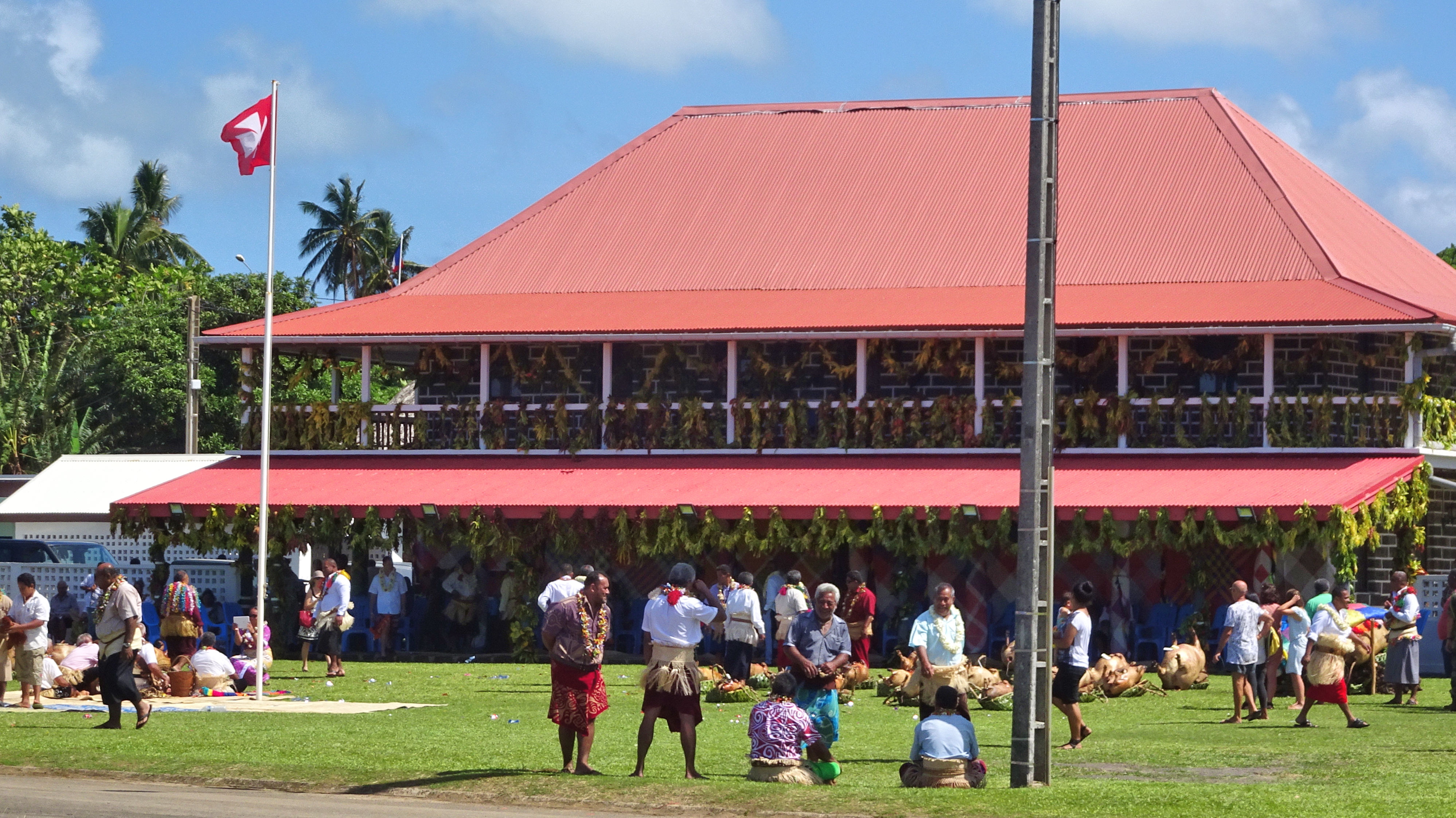
The Royal Palace of Uvea

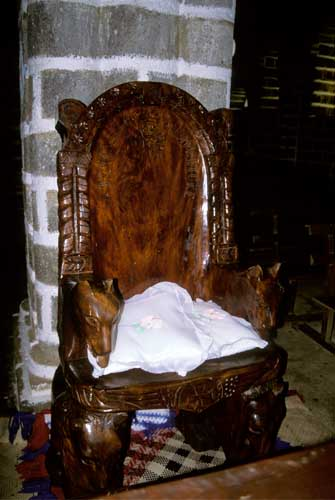
Royal throne of Uvea, in the Cathedral of Our Lady of the Assumption, Mata-Utu

The King of Uvea (titled as Lavelua) is the ruler of the polity of Uvea, the chiefdom (Royaume coutumier, lit. 'customary kingdom') located on Wallis Island. Uvea encompasses the whole island and the surrounding islets.

Wallis Island is part of the French overseas collectivity of Wallis and Futuna (Note: Officially the Territory of the Wallis and Futuna Islands.), in Oceania in the South Pacific Ocean.

== First dynasty from Tu'i Tonga ==
This dynasty ruled approximately 1400–1600.

- Tauloko, 1st Hau of 'Uvea 1400–1426
- Ga'asialili, 2nd Hau of 'Uvea c. 1426 – c. 1456
- Havea Fakahau, 3rd Hau of 'Uvea c. 1456 – c. 1516
- Talapili, joint 4th Hau of 'Uvea, from c. 1516
- Talamohe, joint 5th Hau of 'Uvea, to c. 1565
- Fakahega, 6th Hau of 'Uvea c. 1565–1588
- Siulano, 7th Hau of 'Uvea 1588–1600, died 1600.

== First Takumasiva dynasty ==
This dynasty ruled approximately 1600–1660.

- Takumasiva
- Pou
- Fatualoamanogi
- Emmunimaufenua
- Fakataulavelua
- Filikekai

== Vehi'ika dynasty ==
This dynasty ruled approximately 1660–1780.

- Vehi'ika, 14th Hau of 'Uvea
- Filisika, 15th Hau of 'Uvea
- Kafoa Logologofolau, 16th Hau of 'Uvea
- Munigoto, 17th Hau of 'Uvea
- Galu Atuvaha, 18th Hau of 'Uvea, to 1726
- Galu Fanalua, 19th Hau of 'Uvea 1726–1756
- Galu Vaivaikava, joint 20th Hau of 'Uvea 1756–1768 or 1756–1780
- Kafoka Finekata, joint 21st Hau of 'Uvea 1768–1780 or 1756–1780

== Second Takumasiva dynasty ==
This dynasty ruled approximately 1780–1810.

- Manuka (1780–1810)
- Tufele I (1810–1810) assassinated in 1810

== Kulitea dynasty ==
This dynasty ruled approximately 1810–1820.

- Kulitea (1810–1819)
- Lavekava (joint 1819–1820)
- Hiva (joint 1819–1820) assassinated in 1820

== Third Takumasiva dynasty ==
The present dynasty gained the throne in 1820.

- Muliakaaka (1820–1825)
- Uhila "Moafa" (1825)
- Toifale (fem.) (1825-1829)
- Mulitoto (1829)
- Soane-Patita Vaimua Lavelua (1829–1831) (1st time)
- Takala (1831–1832)
- Soane-Patita Vaimua Lavelua (1832–1858) (2nd time)
- Falakika Seilala (fem.) (1858–1869)
- Amelia Tokagahahau Aliki (fem.) (1869–1895)
- Vito Lavelua II (1895–1904)
- Isaake (11 March 1895 – 12 March 1895) (in rebellion)
- Lusiano Aisake (1904–1906)
- Sosefo Mautāmakia I "Tokila" (1906 – 1 April 1910) (1st time)
- Soane-Patita Lavuia (1910–1916)
- Sosefo Mautāmakia II (1916–1918)
- Vitolo Kulihaapai (1918–1924)
- Tomasi Kulimoetoke I (1924–1928)
- Mikaele Tufele II (1928–1931) (1st time)
- Sosefo Mautāmakia I "Tokila" (1931–1933) (2nd time)
- Petelo Kahofuna (13 March 1933 – 25 May 1933)
- Mikaele Tufele II (2nd time) (25 May 1933 – 30 November 1933) (2nd time)
- Council of Ministers (30 November 1933 – 16 March 1941)
- Leone Mahikitoga (16 March 1941 – 29 March 1947)
- Pelenato Fuluhea "Pulufegu" (1947–1950)
- Kapeliele Tufele III "Setu" (1950–1953)
- Council of Ministers (17 November 1953 – 18 December 1953)
- Soane Toke (18 December 1953 – 19 December 1953)
- Aloisia Brial (née Tautuu) (fem.) (22 December 1953 – 12 September 1958)
- Council of Ministers (12 September 1958 – 12 March 1959)
- Tomasi Kulimoetoke II (12 March 1959 – 7 May 2007)
- Council of Ministers (8 May 2007 – 25 July 2008)
- Kapeliele Faupala (25 July 2008 – 2 September 2014)
- Council of Ministers (2 September 2014 – 16 April 2016)
- Felice Tominiko Halagahu (co-claimant, 16 April 2016 – 3 June 2016)
- Patalione Kanimoa (co-claimant, 17 April/3 June 2016 – present)

== See also ==
- List of kings of Alo
- List of kings of Sigave
- Royal Palace of Uvea

== Sources ==
- 'Uvea mo Futuna: http://www.uvea-mo-futuna.com/article.php3?id_article=87
