= Visesio Moeliku =

King of Sigave

Visesio Moeliku was Tu`i Sigave (King of Sigave), in Wallis and Futuna, from 2004 to 2009.
