= List of kings of Sigave =

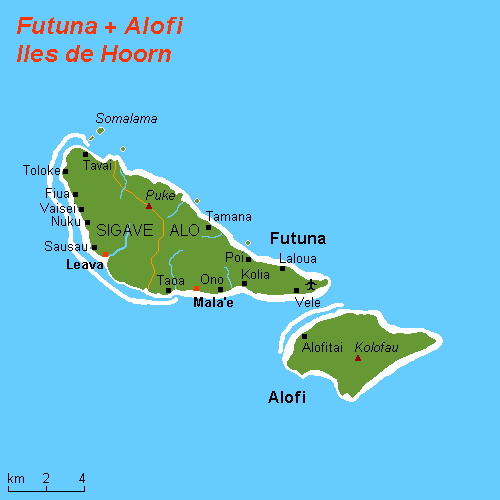
Map of the Hoorn Islands, also called Futuna Islands.

Flag of Sigave.

The King of Sigave (titled as Tu`i Sigave) is the ruler of the polity of Sigave, one of the two chiefdoms (Royaume coutumier, lit. 'customary kingdom') located on Futuna. Sigave encompasses the western part of the island.

Futuna is one of the Hoorn Islands in the French overseas collectivity of Wallis and Futuna (Note: Officially the Territory of the Wallis and Futuna Islands.), in Oceania in the South Pacific Ocean.

== List of rulers of Sigave ==
- Tuikamea (1784– ..)
- Inosiopogoi
- Latuka (.. –1800)
- Vanae (1800 – 10 August 1839)
- Occupation by Alo (10 August 1839 – 1841)
- Petelo Keletaona (1842–1851)
- Alefosio Tamole (1851–18??)
- Anise Tamole (1887?)
- Lutotio (1889?)
- Savelio Keletaona
- Mateo Tamole
- Toviko Keletaona (1st time)
- Tamasi Tamole
- Toviko Keletaona (2nd time)
- Sui Tamole (1st time)
- Ligareto Falemaa (.. –1929)
- Keletaona Keletaona (1929–1932)
- Fololiano Sui Tamole (1932–19??)
- Sui Tamole (19??–19??) (2nd time)
- Amole Keletaona (March 1941 – 29 September 1949)
- Soane Vanai (19??–19??)
- Pio Keletaona (19?? – 27 June 1955)
- Sakopo Tamole "Pausu" (11 July 1955 – 18 January 1957)
- Setefano Lavelua (27 January 1957 – 4 August 1959)
- Sileno Tamole "Veu" (29 September 1959 – 7 April 1969)
- Alefosio Keletaona "Vasa" (31 July 1969 – 24 May 1971)
- Ilalio Amosala (1 June 1971 – 30 September 1972)
- Nasalio Keletaona (1 December 1972 – 1982)
- Sagato Keletaona (4 August 1982 – 1 April 1987)
- Sosefo Vanai (1 April 1987 – 5 April 1990)
- Lafaele Malau (10 May 1990 – 26 October 1994)
- Soane Patita Sokotaua (26 October 1994 – 1997)
- Pasilio Keletaona (26 September 1997 – 26 September 2003)
- Visesio Moeliku (10 March 2004 – August 2009)
- Vacant (August 2009 – 3 July 2010)
- Polikalepo Kolivai (3 July 2010 – October 2014) (disputed)
- Vacant (24 October 2014 – 5 March 2016)
- Eufenio Takala (5 March 2016 – present)

== See also ==
- List of kings of Alo
- List of kings of Uvea
