= Leone Manikitoga =

Leone Mulikiha'amea Matekitoga or Manikitoga was a king of Uvea, ruling from 16 March 1941 until 16 March 1947. He was preceded by Mikaele Tufele II, and succeeded by Pelenato Fuluhea.

He was king during the Second World War and the occupation of Uvea by American troops (1942-1944), a period of strong economic, social and political transformations for Wallis and Futuna. He was chosen by the royal families after 8 years without a sovereign. Resident of France Léon Vrignaud and Bishop Alexandre Poncet supported his appointment by the royal families, which took place on March 16, 1941. Nevertheless, the new Lavelua refused to take the oath of Marshal Pétain, to whom the residence and the mission remained loyal.
