= Sosefo Mautāmakia II =

Sosefo Mautāmakia II was a king of Uvea, ruling from 1916 until 1918. He was preceded by Soane-Patita Lavuia, and succeeded by Vitolo Kulihaapai.
