= Amelia Tokagahahau Aliki =

19th-century queen of Pacific island of Uvea

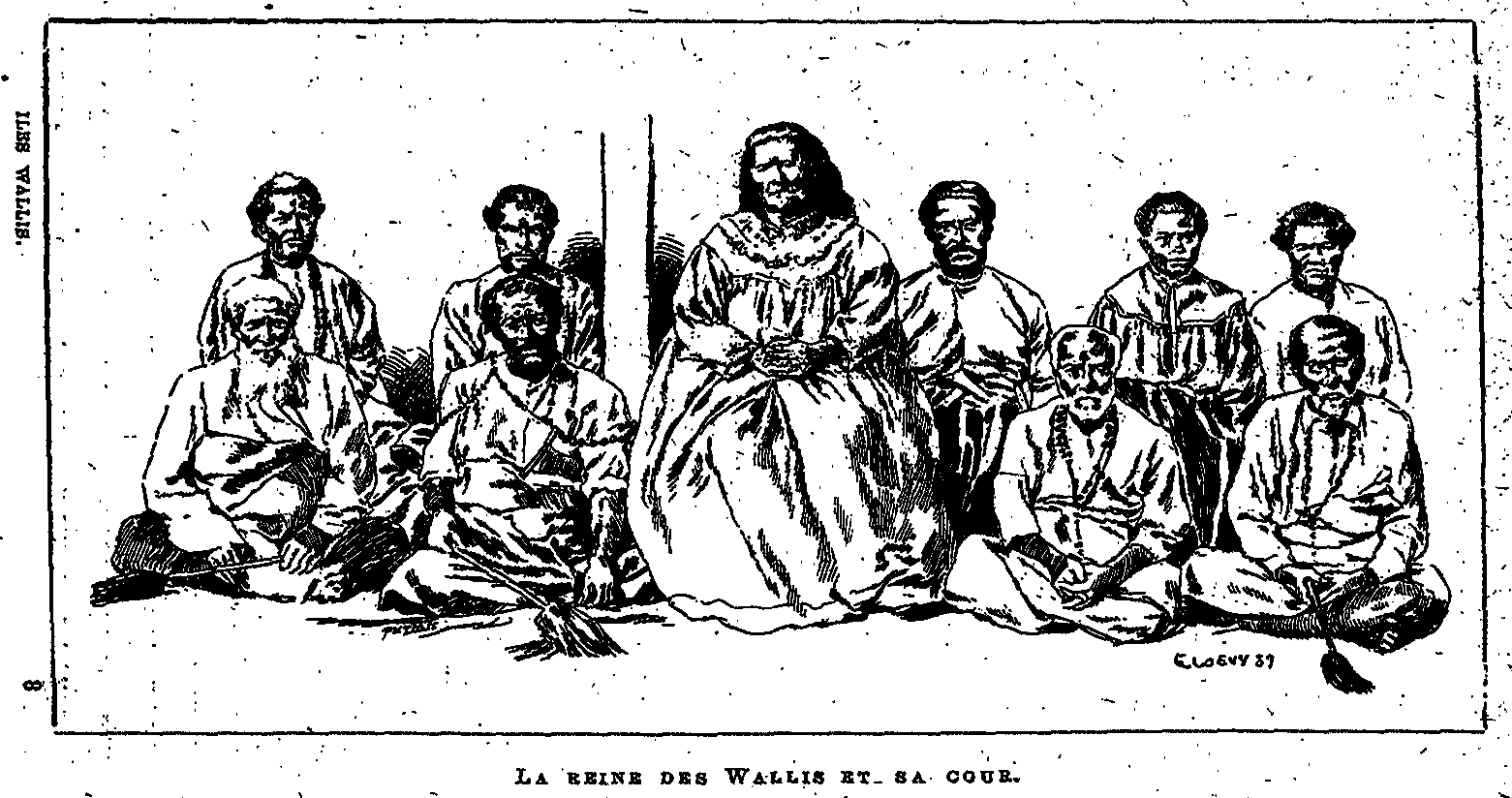
La reine des Wallis (Amelia) et sa cour (vers 1889)

Amelia Tokagahahau Aliki (c. 1845 - 10 March 1895) was a queen of Uvea, ruling from 1869 until 1895. She was preceded by her aunt Falakika Seilala, and succeeded by her son Vito Lavelua II and Isaake.

During her reign, the pacific islands was under severe pressure from the colonial powers, which she was forced to address. In 1887, she signed a treaty making the kingdom a French protectorate in exchange for inner self governance and preservation of the monarchy. She converted to Catholicism and had the royal palace and the cathedral erected in the capital.
