= Sosefo Mautāmakia I =

Sosefo Mautāmakia I, nicknamed Tokila, was a king of Uvea, ruling from 1906 until 1910 and again from 1931 until 1933. He was preceded the first time by Lusiano Aisake, and succeeded by Soane-Patita Lavuia; the second time he succeeded Mikaele Tufele II, and was followed by Petelo Kahofuna. In 1910 he was overthrown after attempting to expel a parish priest.

He died on 11 March 1933.
