= Soane-Patita Lavuia =

Soane-Patita Lavuia (died 30 November 1916) was a king of Uvea, ruling from 1910 until 1916. He succeeded Sosefo Mautāmakia I following a dispute between the king, the resident of France and the Catholic mission.

== Rise to power ==
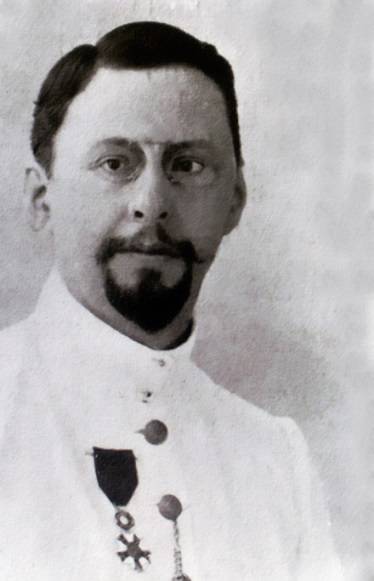
Adrien Bonhoure, Governor of New Caledonia in 1910, helped resolve the political crisis that led to the recognition of Soane Patita Lavuia as King of Uvea.

In 1910, the new resident, Victor Jean Brochard, wanted to expel the Father Superior of the Catholic mission, Father Bazin, and convinced King Sosefo Mautamakia I to side with him. In February 1910, Bazin left Mata-Utu for the Mua District. On 19 March, a royal decree ordered him to leave Wallis. Faced with protests from the Marist fathers, the lavelua maintained its position. A hundred Wallisians favorable to the Marists took up arms and marched on Mata Utu on 1 April; the king, abandoned by his family, was then forced to abdicate. Soane Patita Lavuia was chosen to be the next ruler, but Brochard refused to accept his election. The crisis was resolved on 18 May with the arrival by ship of the governor of New Caledonia, Adrien Bonhoure, who asked the resident to make an official apology to Father Bazin. A new deliberation of the customary chiefs was held on board the warship Kersaint on 19 May 1910, and Soane Patita Lavuia was confirmed as the new Lavelua.

== Death ==
He died on 30 November, 1916 and was buried in the royal vault of the Cathedral of Our Lady of the Assumption, Mata-Utu. After his death Sosefo Mautāmakia II was chosen as king to succeed him.
