= Mikaele Tufele II =

Mikaele Tufele II (died 30 November 1933) was a king of Uvea, ruling from 1928 until 1931, and again for a brief time in 1933. He was preceded by Tomasi Kulimoetoke I, and succeeded by Sosefo Mautāmakia I.

In May 1933 he was re-elected as king following the French colonial administrations overthrow of Petelo Kahofuna. He reigned for only a few months, before dying on 30 November 1933. Following his death ministers could not agree on a replacement, and instead agreed to rule as a council under the Resident of Wallis and Futuna. This arrangement lasted until March 1941, when Leone Manikitoga was elected as king.
