= Soane-Patita Vaimua Lavelua =

Soane-Patita Vaimua Lavelua (1799 — 21 November 1858) was a king of Uvea in the 19th century. He was named king in 1829 at the age of thirty) and reigned until his death in 1858. During his reign, Marist missionaries landed in Wallis in 1837 and converted the population. He then became the first Lavelua baptized Catholic and took the name Jean-Baptiste, in Wallisian "Soane Patita". He died at almost sixty years of age of pneumonia on 21 November 1858. His sister Falakika Seilala succeeded him only a few weeks later, on 5 December 1858.

He was the father of Amelia Tokagahahau Aliki, who become queen of Uvea in 1869, and of Vito Lavelua II, who became king in 1895.
