= Vitolo Kulihaapai =

Vitolo Kulihaapai was a king of Uvea, ruling from 1918 until 1924. He was preceded by Sosefo Mautāmakia II, and succeeded by Tomasi Kulimoetoke I.
