= Kapeliele Tufele III =

Kapeliele Tufele III was a king of Uvea, who ruled from 17 April 1950 until 17 November 1953. He was preceded by Pelenato Fuluhea, and succeeded by Aloisia Brial.

== Rise to power ==
In April 1950, dissension appeared within the Wallisian leadership, “relaying the social problems of the time: authoritarianism of certain civil servants; generational divide in the local clergy; return of Wallisians sensitized to “union” ideas”. Faced with opposition, particularly from the Hihifo District, King Pelenato Fuluhea resigned on 11 April. On 13 April, the chiefs elected Emmanuel Brial, a French merchant and son of Aloisia Brial (thus attached to a royal line). However, the appointment was opposed by the French resident as he did not want a Frenchman to become king of Wallis. Kapeliele Tufele, aged 70, was then elected on 17 April as a “transition king”.

== Reign and resignation ==
According to Gildas Pressensé, “Kapeliele Tufele, known as Setu – much older [than his predecessor], was very conservative and very attached to his customary prerogatives, often ignoring the presence of the Resident of France”. Relations become very tense with the resident, the latter attempting three times to have him dismissed.

Bishop Alexandre Poncet successfully opposed his dismissal for the first time, but the customary chiefs decided to ignore the second time, which for Frédéric Angleviel represented the mark of "political maturity" in the face of the influence of the clergy in Wallis.

Kapeliele Tufele abdicated on 17 November 1953. After negotiations between the royal families and with the approval of France's High Commissioner to the Pacific Ocean, Aloisia Brial was elected Queen of Uvea on 22 December 1953.
