= Toifale =

Toifale (died 1829), was a ruling Queen of Uvea between 1825 and 1829.

She was preceded by Uhila, and succeeded by Mulitoto.
