= Vito Lavelua II =

King of Uvea

Vito Lavelua II was a king of Uvea, ruling from 1895 until 1904. He succeeded Queen Amelia Tokagahahau Aliki after her death (the succession causing a political crisis, before his appointment was finalized). He was succeeded by Lusiano Aisake.
