= Aloisia Brial =

Queen of Uvea

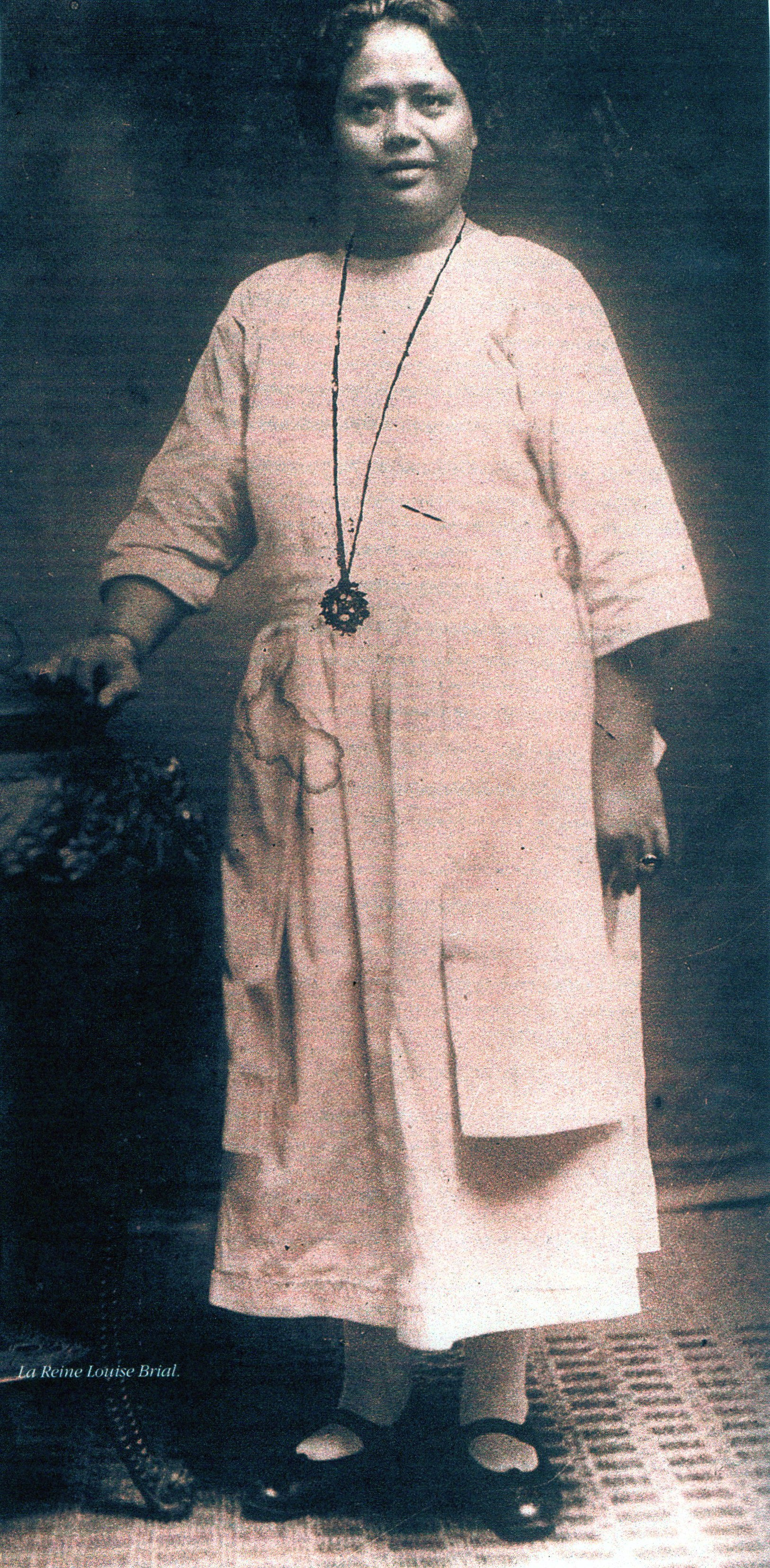
Aloisia I regina di wallis

Aloisia Brial (died 1972) was a queen of Uvea, ruling from 1953 until 1958. She was preceded by Soane Toke, and succeeded by Tomasi Kulimoetoke II.

Uvea is also known as Wallis Island of the Territory of Wallis and Futuna Islands.

Her grandsons Sylvain Brial and Gil Brial are Member of the French Parliament and the Congress of New Caledonia respectively.
