= List of governors of dependent territories in the 20th century =

This is a list of territorial governors in the 20th century (1901–2000) AD, such as the administrators of colonies, protectorates, or other dependencies. Where applicable, native rulers are also listed.

For the purposes of this list, a current dependency is any entity listed on these lists of dependent territories and other entities. A dependent territory is normally a territory that does not possess full political independence or sovereignty as a sovereign state yet remains politically outside of the controlling state's integral area. This latter condition distinguishes a dependent territory from an autonomous region or administrative division, which forms an integral part of the 'parent' state. The administrators of uninhabited territories are excluded.

== Australia ==
Australia

  - Monarchs
  - Prime ministers
- Administrators of the Australian Indian Ocean Territories:
- Note: administrates Christmas Island (since 1998) and Cocos (Keeling) Islands (since 1996)
  - Danny Ambrose Gillespie, administrator (1994–1996)
  - Ron Harvey, administrator (1997–1998)
  - Bill Taylor, administrator (1999–2003)
- Christmas Island, territory
  - Administrators, until 1998
    - Donald Evan Nickels, Official representative (1958–1960)
    - John William Stokes, Official representative (1960–1966)
    - Charles Ivens Buffett, Official representative (1966–1968)
    - Leslie Dudley King, administrator (1968–1970)
    - John Sampson White, administrator (1970–1973)
    - Frank Evatt, administrator (1973–1974)
    - Harry Webb, administrator (1974–1975)
    - William Worth, administrator (1975–1977)
    - Francis Charles Boyle, administrator (1977–1980)
    - Mac Holten, administrator (1980–1982)
    - William Yates, administrator (1982–1983)
    - Thomas Ferguson Paterson, administrator (1983–1986)
    - C. Stephens, acting administrator (1986)
    - Alexander Taylor, administrator (1986–1990)
    - William Albany McKenzie, administrator (1990–1991)
    - A. Mitchell, acting administrator (1991)
    - P. Gifford, acting administrator (1991–1992)
    - Michael John Grimes, administrator (1992–1994)
    - Peter Woods, acting administrator (1994)
    - Danny Ambrose Gillespie, administrator (1994–1996)
    - Merrilyn Ann Chilvers, acting administrator (1996–1997)
    - Graham Nicholls, acting administrator (1997)
    - Ronald Harvey, administrator (1997–1998)
  - President of the Christmas Island Shire Council
    - Lillian Oh, President (1992–1995)
    - Jeffery Tan, Acting President (1995–1997)
    - Andrew Smolders, President (1998–1999)
    - Dave McLane, President (1999–2001)
- Cocos (Keeling) Islands, territory
  - Administrators, until 1996
    - Charles Ivens Buffett, administrator (1977–1980)
  - President of the Shire of Cocos
    - Parson bin Yapat, Chairmen (1979–1981)
    - Wahin bin Bynie, Chairmen (1981–1983)
    - Parson bin Yapat, Chairmen (1983–1993)
    - Ron Grant, President (1993–1995)
    - Radal bin Feyrel, President (1995–1999)
    - Mohammad Said Chongkin, President (1999–2001)
- Norfolk Island, territory
  - Administrators
    - Robert Nixon Dalkin, administrator (1968–1972)
    - Desmond Vincent O'Leary, administrator (1976–1979)
    - Peter Coleman, administrator (1979–1981)
    - Ian Hutchinson, acting administrator (1981)
    - Thomas Ferguson Paterson, acting administrator (1981–1982)
    - Tony Messner, administrator (1997–2003)
  - Heads of government
    - William M. Randall, President of the Island council (1967–1974)
    - William Arthur Blucher, President of the Island council (1976–1978)
    - David Buffett, Chief minister (1979–1986)
    - George Charles Smith, Chief Minister (1997–2000)
    - Ronald Coane Nobbs, Chief Minister (2000–2001)
- Territory of New Guinea
  - Administrators
- Territory of Papua
  - Administrators
- Territory of Papua and New Guinea
  - Administrators (Papua and New Guinea)
    - Jack Keith Murray, administrator (1945–1952)
    - Donald Cleland, administrator (1952–1966)
    - David Hay, administrator (1966–1970)
    - Leslie Johnson, administrator (1970–1973), High commissioner (1973–1974)
  - High commissioners (Papua New Guinea)
    - Leslie Johnson, administrator (1970–1973), High commissioner (1973–1974)
    - Tom Critchley, High commissioner (1974–1975)

== Belgium ==
Belgium
Belgian colonial empire

  - Monarchs
  - Prime ministers
- Belgian Congo
  - Governors general
    - Théophile Wahis, Governor general (1908–1912)
    - Félix Fuchs, Governor general (1912–1916)
    - Eugène Henry, Governor general (1916–1921)
    - Maurice Lippens, Governor general (1921–1923)
    - Martin Rutten, Governor general (1923–1927)
    - Auguste Tilkens, Governor general (1927–1934)
    - Auguste Tilkens, Governor general (1927–1934)
    - Pierre Ryckmans, Governor general (1934–1946)
    - Eugène Jungers, Governor general (1947–1951)
    - Léon Pétillon, Governor general (1952–1958)
    - Henri Cornelis, Governor general (1958–1960)

== China ==
People's Republic of China

  - Party chairmen
  - Presidents
  - Premiers
- Hong Kong, special administrative region
  - Chief executives
    - Tung Chee-hwa, Chief executive (1997–2005)
- Macau, special administrative region
  - Chief executives
    - Edmund Ho Hau Wah, Chief executive (1999–2009)

== Denmark ==
Denmark

  - Monarchs
  - Prime ministers
- Faroe Islands, autonomous territory
  - High commissioners
    - Cai A. Vagn-Hansen, High commissioner (1948–1954)
    - Niels Elkær-Hansen, High commissioner (1954–1961)
    - Mogens Wahl, High commissioner (1961–1972)
    - Leif Groth, High commissioner (1972–1981)
    - Niels Bentsen, High commissioner (1981–1988)
    - Bent Klinte, High commissioner (1988–1995)
    - Vibeke Larsen, High commissioner (1995–2001)
  - Prime ministers
    - Andrass Samuelsen, Prime minister (1948–1950)
    - Kristian Djurhuus, Prime minister (1950–1959)
    - Peter Mohr Dam, Prime minister (1959–1963)
    - Hákun Djurhuus, Prime minister (1963–1967)
    - Peter Mohr Dam, Prime minister (1967–1968)
    - Kristian Djurhuus, Prime minister (1968–1970)
    - Atli Dam, Prime minister (1970–1981)
    - Pauli Ellefsen, Prime minister (1981–1985)
    - Atli Dam, Prime minister (1985–1989)
    - Jógvan Sundstein, Prime minister (1989–1991)
    - Atli Dam, Prime minister (1991–1993)
    - Marita Petersen, Prime minister (1993–1994)
    - Edmund Joensen, Prime minister (1994–1998)
    - Anfinn Kallsberg, Prime minister (1998–2004)
- Greenland, autonomous territory
  - Governors
    - Hans Lassen, Governor (1973–1979)
  - High commissioners
    - Torben Hede Pedersen, High commissioner (1979–1992)
    - Steen Spore, High commissioner (1992–1995)
    - Gunnar Martens, High commissioner (1995–2002)
  - Prime ministers
    - Jonathan Motzfeldt, Prime minister (1979–1991)
    - Lars Emil Johansen, Prime minister (1991–1997)
    - Jonathan Motzfeldt, Prime minister (1997–2002)

== Finland ==
Finland

  - Presidents
  - Prime ministers
- Åland, autonomous region
  - Governors
    - Hjalmar von Bonsdorff, Governor (1918)
    - William Isaksson, Governor (1918–1922)
    - Lars Wilhelm Fagerlund, Governor (1922–1937)
    - Torsten Rothberg, Governor (1938)
    - Ruben Österberg, Governor (1939–1945)
    - Herman Koroleff, Governor (1945–1953)
    - Tor Brenning, Governor (1954–1972)
    - Martin Isaksson, Governor (1972–1982)
    - Henrik Gustafsson, Governor (1982–1999)
    - Peter Lindbäck, Governor (1999–2009)
  - Premiers of Åland
    - Carl Björkman, Premier (1922–1938)
    - Viktor Strandfält, Premier (1938–1955)
    - Hugo Johansson, Premier (1955–1967)
    - Martin Isaksson, Premier (1967–1972)
    - Alarik Häggblom, Premier (1972–1979)
    - Folke Woivalin, Premier (1979–1988)
    - Sune Eriksson, Premier (1988–1991)
    - Ragnar Erlandsson, Premier (1991–1995)
    - Roger Jansson, Premier (1995–1999)
    - Roger Nordlund, Premier (1999–2007)

== France ==
French Third Republic, Vichy France, French Fourth Republic, French Fifth Republic

  - Heads of state
  - Prime ministers

=== Africa ===
- French Dahomey
  - Governors, Lieutenant governors
    - Jean Desanti, acting Lieutenant governor (1934–1935)
    - Maurice Léon Bourgine, Lieutenant governor (1935–1937)
- French Guinea
  - Lieutenant governors, Governors
    - Paul Jean François Cousturier, Lieutenant governor (1900–1904)
    - Antoine Marie Frezouls, Lieutenant governor (1904–1906)
    - Jules Louis Richard, Acting Lieutenant governor (1906–1907)
    - Joost van Vollenhouven, Acting Lieutenant governor (1907)
    - Georges Poulet, Acting Lieutenant governor (1907–1908)
    - Victor Théophile Liotard, Lieutenant governor (1908–1910)
    - Georges Poulet, Acting Lieutenant governor (1910)
    - Camille Guy, Lieutenant governor (1910–1912)
    - Jean Louis Georges Poiret, Acting Lieutenant governor (1912–1913)
    - Jean Jules Émile Peuvergne, Lieutenant governor (1913–1915)
    - Jean Louis Georges Poiret, Lieutenant governor (1915–1919)
    - Fernand Lavit, Acting Lieutenant governor (1919–1920)
    - Jean Louis Georges Poiret, Lieutenant governor (1920–1922)
    - Jules Vidal, Acting Lieutenant governor (1922)
    - Jean Louis Georges Poiret, Lieutenant governor (1922–1925)
    - Robert Simon, Acting Lieutenant governor (1925)
    - Jean Louis Georges Poiret, Lieutenant governor (1925–1927)
    - Antoine Paladi, Lieutenant governor (1927–1928)
    - Jean-Claude Tissier, Acting Lieutenant governor (1928)
    - Jean Louis Georges Poiret, Lieutenant governor (1928–1929)
    - Louis François Antonin, Acting Lieutenant governor (1929–1931)
    - Robert Paul Marie de Guise, Lieutenant governor (1931–1932)
    - Joseph Vadier, Lieutenant governor (1932–1933)
    - Antoine Paladi, Acting Lieutenant governor (1933)
    - Joseph Vadier, Lieutenant governor (1933–1935)
    - Louis Placide Blacher, Acting Lieutenant governor (1935)
    - Joseph Vadier, Lieutenant governor (1935–1936)
    - Joseph Vadier, Lieutenant governor (1935–1936)
    - Louis Placide Blacher, Governor (1936–1937)
    - Louis Placide Blacher, Governor (1936–1937)
    - Pierre Tap, Acting Governor (1937–1938)
    - Louis-Placide Blacher, Governor (1938–1939)
    - Felix Martine, Acting Governor (1939)
    - Louis-Placide Blacher, Governor (1939–1940)
    - Antoine Félix Giacobbi, Governor (1940–1942)
    - Horace Valentin Crocicchia, Governor (1942–1944)
    - Jacques Georges Fourneau, Acting Governor (1944–1946)
    - Édouard Louis Terrac, Governor (1946–1948)
    - Roland Pré, Governor (1948–1951)
    - Roland Pré, Governor (1948–1951)
    - Roland Pré, Governor (1948–1951)
    - Paul Henri Sirieix, Governor (1951–1953)
    - Jean Paul Parisot, Governor (1953–1955)
    - Charles-Henri Bonfils, Governor (1955–1956)
    - Jean Paul Ramadier, Governor (1956–1958)
    - Jean Mauberna, Acting Governor (1958)
- Mayotte
  - Prefects
    - Jean Coussirou, Prefect (1976–1978)
    - Jean Rigotard, Prefect (1978–1980)
    - Philippe Jacques Nicolas Kessler, Prefect (1980–1981)
    - Pierre Sevellec, Prefect (1981–1982)
  - Presidents of the General council
    - Younoussa Bamana, President (1976–1991)
- French Somaliland
  - Governors
    - Louis Ormiéres, Acting Governor (1901–1902)
    - Adrien Jules Jean Bonhoure, Governor (1902–1903)
    - Albert Dubarry, Acting Governor (1903)
    - Adrien Jules Jean Bonhoure, Governor (1903–1904)
    - Albert Dubarry, Acting Governor (1904)
    - Pierre Hubert Auguste Pascal, Governor (1904–1905)
    - Raphaël Antonetti, Acting Governor (1905)
    - Louis Ormiéres, Acting Governor (1905–1906)
    - Patte, Acting Governor (1906)
    - Pierre Hubert Auguste Pascal, Governor (1906–1908)
    - Jean-Baptiste Castaing, Acting Governor (1908–1909)
    - Pierre Hubert Auguste Pascal, Governor (1909–1911)
    - Jean-Baptiste Castaing, Acting Governor (1911)
    - Pierre Hubert Auguste Pascal, Governor (1911–1915)
    - Paul Simoni, Governor (1915–1916)
    - Victor Marie Fillon, Governor (1916–1918)
    - Jules Gérard Auguste Lauret, Governor (1918–1924)
    - Pierre Aimable Chapon-Baissac, Governor (1924–1932)
    - Louis Placide Blacher, Governor (1932–1934)
    - Jules Marcel de Coppet, Governor (1934–1935)
    - Achille Louis Auguste Silvestre, Governor (1935)
    - Armand Léon Annet, Governor (1935–1937)
    - Marie Francois Julien Pierre-Alype, Governor (1937–1938)
    - Hubert Jules Deschamps, Governor (1938–1940)
    - Gaetan Louis Elie Germain, Governor (1940)
    - Pierre Marie Elie Louis Nouailhetas, Governor (1940–1942)
    - Christian Raimond Dupont, Governor (1942)
    - Ange Marie Charles André Bayardelle, Governor (1942–1943)
    - Michel Raphael Antoine Saller, Governor (1943–1944)
    - Jean Victor Louis Joseph Chalvet, Governor (1944–1946)
    - Paul Henri Siriex, Governor (1946–1950)
    - Numa François Henri Sadoul, Governor (1950–1954)
    - Roland Joanes Louis Pré, Governor (1954)
    - René Petitbon, Governor (1954–1957)
    - Maurice Meker, Governor (1957–1958)
    - Jacques Marie Julien Compain, Governor (1958–1962)
    - René Tirant, Governor (1962–1966)
    - Louis Saget, Governor (1966–1967), High commissioner (1967–1969)
- French Territory of the Afars and the Issas
  - High commissioners
    - Louis Saget, Governor (1966–1967), High commissioner (1967–1969)
    - Dominique Ponchardier, High commissioner (1969–1971)
    - Georges Thiercy, High commissioner (1971–1974)
    - Christian Dablanc, High commissioner (1974–1976)
    - Camille d'Ornano, High commissioner (1976–1977)
  - Presidents of the Government council
    - Ali Aref Bourhan, President (1967–1976)
    - Abdallah Mohamed Kamil, President (1976–1977)

=== Asia ===
- French Indochina
  - Governors general
    - Paul Doumer, Governor general (1897–1902)
- French India
  - Governors general
    - Adrien Jules Jean Bonhoure, Governor general (1908–1909)
    - Ernest Fernand Lévecque, Governor general (1909–1910)

=== Caribbean ===
- Saint Barthélemy, overseas collectivity
  - Prefects: the prefect of Guadeloupe has been the representative of Saint Barthélemy since 2007
    - Jacques Billant, Prefect of Guadeloupe (2014–present)
  - Prefects-delegated of Saint Barthélemy and Saint Martin
  - Presidents of the Territorial Council
- Saint Martin, territorial collectivity
  - Prefects: the prefect of Guadeloupe has been the representative of Saint Martin since 2007
    - Jacques Billant, Prefect of Guadeloupe (2014–present)
  - Prefects-delegated of Saint Martin and Saint Martin
  - Presidents of the Territorial Council

=== North America ===
- Saint Pierre and Miquelon, overseas collectivity
  - Governors, Prefects
    - Jean-Jacques Buggia, Governor (1967–1971)
    - Pierre Eydoux, Prefect (1977–1979)
    - Clément Bouhin, Prefect (1979–1981)
    - Claude Guyon, Prefect (1981–1982)
  - Presidents of the General council
    - Albert Pen, President (1968–1984)

=== Oceania ===
- French Comoros
  - High commissioners
    - Jacques Mouradian, High commissioner (1969–1975)
  - President of the Government council
    - Said Mohamed Cheikh, President (1962–1970)
    - Said Ibrahim Ben Ali, President (1970–1972)
- French Polynesia, overseas collectivity
  - High commissioners
    - Michel Lucien Montagné, Governor (1933–1935)
    - Henri Sautot, Acting Governor (1935–1937)
    - Pierre Louis Angeli, High commissioner (1969–1973)
    - Paul Cousseran, High commissioner (1977–1981)
    - Paul Noirot-Cosson, High commissioner (1981–1983)
    - Jean Aribaud, High commissioner (1997–2001)
  - Presidents
    - Gaston Flosse, President (1984–1987)
    - Jacques Teuira, President (1987)
    - Alexandre Léontieff, President (1987–1991)
    - Gaston Flosse, President (1991–2004)
- New Caledonia, special collectivity
  - Governors, High commissioners
    - Gabriel Ériau, Governor of New Caledonia (1974–1978)
    - Claude Charbonniaud, Governor (1978–1981)
    - Christian Nucci, High commissioner (1981–1982)
  - Presidents of the Government
    - Jean Lèques, President (1999–2001)
- Wallis and Futuna, overseas collectivity
  - Administrators superior
    - Jean Léon Périé, administrator superior (1961–1962)
    - Jacques Emmanuel Victor Herry, administrator superior (1962–1962)
    - Jean Marie Pierre Bertrand, administrator superior (1962–1964)
    - André Pierre François Duc-Dufayard, administrator superior (1964–1966)
    - Fernand Lamodière, administrator superior (1966–1968)
    - Jacques Frédéric Gabriel Bach, administrator superior (1968–1971)
    - Guy Robert Boileau, administrator superior (1971–1972)
    - Jacques Ferrante de Agostini, administrator superior (1972–1974)
    - Yves Robert Émile Louis Arbellot-Repaire, administrator superior (1975–1976)
    - Henri Charles Beaux, administrator superior (1976–1979)
    - Pierre Jean Marc Isaac, administrator superior (1979–1980)
    - Robert Gilbert Georges Thil, administrator superior (1980–1983)
    - Michel Kuhnmunch, administrator superior (1984–1985)
    - Bernard Lesterlin, administrator superior (1985–1986)
    - Jacques Le Hénaff, administrator superior (1986–1987)
    - Gérard Lambotte, administrator superior (1987–1988)
    - Roger Dumec, administrator superior (1988–1990)
    - Robert Pommies, administrator superior (1990–1993)
    - Philippe Legrix, administrator superior (1993–1994)
    - Léon Alexandre Legrand, administrator superior (1994–1996)
    - Claude Pierret, administrator superior (1996–1998)
    - Christian Dors, administrator superior (1998–2000)
    - Alain Waquet, administrator superior (2000–2002)
  - Presidents of the Territorial assembly
    - Paino Tu'ugahala, President (1962–1967)
    - Sosefe Makapé Papillo, President (1967–1972)
    - Mikaele Folaumahina, President (1972–1975)
    - Soane Patita Lakina, President (1975–1977)
    - Pasilio Tui, President (1977–1978)
    - Manuele Lisahi, President (1978–1984)
    - Pasilio Tui, President (1984–1986)
    - Petelo Takatai, President (1986–1987)
    - Keleto Lakalala, President (1987)
    - Falakiko Gata, President (1987–1988)
    - Manuele Lisiahi, President (1988–1989)
    - Pasilio Tui, President (1989–1990)
    - Clovis Logologofolau, President (1990–1992)
    - Soane Mani Uhila, President (1992–1994)
    - Mikaele Tauhavili, President (1994–1996)
    - Keleto Lakalaka, President (1996–1997)
    - Victor Brial, President (1997–1999)
    - Soane Mani Uhila, President (1999–2001)
  - Kings of Uvea (Wallis)
    - Vito Lavelua II, King (1895–1904)
    - Lusiano Aisake, King (1904–1906)
    - Sosefo Mautāmakia I, King "Tokila" (1906–1910)
    - Soane-Patita Lavuia, King (1910–1916)
    - Sosefo Mautāmakia II, King (1916–1918)
    - Vitolo Kulihaapai, King (1918–1924)
    - Tomasi Kulimoetoke I, King (1924–1928)
    - Mikaele Tufele II, King (1928–1931)
    - Sosefo Mautāmakia I, King (1931–1933)
    - Petelo Kahofuna, King (1933)
    - Mikaele Tufele II, King (1933)
    - Council of Ministers (1933–1941)
    - Leone Mahikitoga, King (1941–1947)
    - Pelenato Fuluhea, King (1947–1950)
    - Kapeliele Tufele III, King (1950–1953)
    - Council of Ministers (1953)
    - Soane Toke, King (1953)
    - Aloisia Brial (née Tautuu), Queen (1953–1958)
    - Council of Ministers (1958–1959)
    - Tomasi Kulimoetoke II, King (1959–2007)
  - Kings of Alo
    - Soane Malia Musulamu, King (c.1887–1929)
    - Soane Moefana, King (1929–1932)
    - Tuiseka, King
    - Usanio Pipisega, King
    - Paloto Aika, King
    - Savelio Meitala, King
    - Kamilo Katea, King
    - Maleselino Maituku, King
    - Kolio Maituku, King
    - Papilio Tala'e, King
    - Lelipo Pipisega, King
    - Alesio Feta'u, King
    - Petelo Savo Meitala, King
    - Soane Va Pipisega, King
    - Silisio Katea, King
    - Petelo Tala'e, King
    - Vito Tuiseka, King
    - Petelo Maituku, King (?–1958)
    - Setefano Tuikalepa, King (1958–1960)
    - Kamaliele Moefana, King (1960–1961)
    - Pio Tagatamanogi, King (1961–1962)
    - Mikaele Fanene, King (1962–?)
    - Seteone Pipisega, King (?–1970)
    - Petelo Maituku, King (1970–1973)
    - Mikaele Katea, King (1973–1974)
    - Patita Savea, King (1974–1976)
    - Kalepo Nau, King (1977–1978)
    - Nopeleto Tuikalepa, King (1979–1984)
    - Petelo Lemo, King (1984–1990)
    - Lomano Musulamu, King (1990–1995)
    - Esipio Takasi, King (1995–1997)
    - Sagato Alofi, King (1997–2002)
  - Kings of Sigave
    - Mateo Tamole, King (19th/20th century)
    - Toviko Keletaona, King (19th/20th century)
    - Tamasi Tamole, King (early 20th century)
    - Toviko Keletaona, King (early 20th century)
    - Sui Tamole, King (early 20th century)
    - Ligareto Falemaa, King (?–1929)
    - Keletaona Keletaona, King (1929–1932)
    - Fololiano Sui Tamole, King (1932–1930s)
    - Sui Tamole, King (1930s)
    - Amole Keletaona, King (1941–1949)
    - Soane Vanai, King (1950s)
    - Pio Keletaona, King (?–1955)
    - Sakopo Tamole, Pausu (1955–1957)
    - Setefano Lavelua, King (1957–1959)
    - Sileno Tamole, Veu (1959–1969)
    - Alefosio Keletaona, Vasa (1969–1971)
    - Ilalio Amosala, King (1971–1972)
    - Nasalio Keletaona, King (1972–1982)
    - Sagato Keletaona, King (1982–1987)
    - Sosefo Vanai, King (1987–1990)
    - Lafaele Malau, King (1990–1994)
    - Soane Patita Sokotaua, King (1994–1997)
    - Pasilio Keletaona, King (1997–2003)

== Japan ==
Empire of Japan
Japanese colonial empire

  - Monarchs
  - Prime ministers
- Karafuto Prefecture
  - Governors general
    - Suzuki Yonosuke, Proconsul (1905)
    - Kiichirō Kumagai, Governor general (1905–1907)
    - Kusunose Yukihiko, Governor general (1907–1908)
    - Tokonami Takejirō, Governor general (1908–1908)
    - Sadatarō Hiraoka, Governor general (1908–1914)
    - Bunji Okada, Governor general (1914–1916)
    - Akira Sakaya, Governor general (1916–1919)
    - Kinjirō Nagai, Governor general (1919–1924)
    - Akira Sakaya, Governor general (1924–1926)
    - Katsuzō Toyota, Governor general (1926–1927)
    - Kōji Kita, Governor general (1927–1929)
    - Shinobu Agata, Governor general (1929–1931)
    - Masao Kishimoto, Governor general (1931–1932)
    - Takeshi Imamura, Governor general (1932–1938)
    - Toshikazu Munei, Governor general (1938–1940)
    - Masayoshi Ogawa, Governor general (1940–1943)
    - Toshio Ōtsu, Governor general (1943–1947)
- Japanese Korea
  - Governors general
    - Itō Hirobumi, Resident general (1905–1909)
    - Sone Arasuke, Resident general (1909)
    - Terauchi Masatake, Resident general (1909–1910), Governor general (1910–1916)
    - Hasegawa Yoshimichi, Governor general (1916–1919)
    - Saitō Makoto, Governor general (1919–1927)
    - Kazushige Ugaki, Governor general (1927)
    - Yamanashi Hanzō, Governor general (1927–1929)
    - Saitō Makoto, Governor general (1929–1931)
    - Kazushige Ugaki, Governor general (1931–1936)
    - Jirō Minami, Governor general (1936–1942)
    - Kuniaki Koiso, Governor general (1942–1944)
    - Nobuyuki Abe, Governor general (1944–1945)
- Japanese Taiwan
  - Governors general
    - Kodama Gentarō Governor general (1898–1906)
    - Sakuma Samata Governor general (1906–1915)
    - Andō Sadami Governor general (1915–1916)
    - Akashi Motojirō Governor general (1916–1917)
    - Den Kenjirō Governor general (1919–1923)
    - Uchida Kakichi Governor general (1923–1924)
    - Takio Izawa, Governor general (1924–1926)
    - Kamiyama Mitsunoshin, Governor general (1926–1928)
    - Kawamura Takeji, Governor general (1928–1929)
    - Ishizuka Eizō, Governor general (1929–1931)
    - Ōta Masahiro, Governor general (1931–1932)
    - Hiroshi Minami, Governor general (1932)
    - Nakagawa Kenzō Governor general (1932–1936)
    - Seizō Kobayashi Governor general (1936–1940)
    - Kiyoshi Hasegawa Governor general (1940–1944)
    - Rikichi Ando Governor general (1944–1945)

== Netherlands ==
Kingdom of the Netherlands
Dutch colonial empire

  - Monarchs
  - Prime ministers

Asia

- Dutch East Indies
  - Governors general, High commissioners
    - Willem Rooseboom, Governors general (1899–1904)
    - J. B. van Heutsz, Governors general (1904–1909)
    - Alexander Willem Frederik Idenburg, Governors general (1909–1916)
    - Johan Paul van Limburg Stirum, Governors general (1916–1921)
    - Dirk Fock, Governors general (1921–1926)
    - Andries Cornelis Dirk de Graeff, Governors general (1926–1931)
    - Bonifacius Cornelis de Jonge, Governors general (1931–1936)
    - Tjarda van Starkenborgh Stachouwer, Governors general (1936–1942)
    - Hubertus van Mook, Governors general (1942–1948)
    - Louis Beel, High commissioner (1948–1949)
    - Tony Lovink, High commissioner (1949)

Caribbean

- Aruba, autonomous territory
  - Governors
    - Felipe Tromp, Governor (1986–1992)
    - Olindo Koolman, Governor (1992–2004)
  - Prime ministers
    - Henny Eman, Prime minister (1986–1989)
    - Nelson Oduber, Prime minister (1989–1994)
    - Henny Eman, Prime minister (1994–2001)

== New Zealand ==
New Zealand

  - Monarchs
  - Prime ministers
- Cook Islands, state in free association
  - High commissioners
    - Leslie James Davis, High commissioner (1965–1972)
  - Queen's Representatives
    - Gaven Donne, Queen's representative (1982–1984)
    - Graham Speight, Acting Queen's representative (1984)
    - Tangaroa Tangaroa, Queen's representative (1984–1990)
    - Apenera Short, Queen's representative (1990–2000)
    - Lawrence Murray Greig, Acting Queen's representative (2000–2001)
  - Prime ministers
    - Albert Henry, Prime minister (1965–1978)
    - Tom Davis, Prime minister (1978–1983)
    - Geoffrey Henry, Prime minister (1983)
    - Tom Davis, Prime minister (1983–1987)
    - Pupuke Robati, Prime minister (1987–1989)
    - Geoffrey Henry, Prime minister (1989–1999)
    - Joe Williams, Prime minister (1999)
    - Terepai Maoate, Prime minister (1999–2002)
- Niue, associated state
  - Commissioners
    - Selwyn Digby Wilson, Resident commissioner (1968–197?)
  - Representatives
    - Terry Baker, New Zealand Representative (1979–1982)
  - Premiers
    - Robert Rex, Premier (1974–1992)
    - Young Vivian, Premier (1992–1993)
    - Frank Lui, Premier (1993–1999)
    - Sani Lakatani, Premier (1999–2002)
- Tokelau, territory
  - Administrators
    - George Spafford Richardson, administrator (1926–1928)
    - Stephen Allen, administrator (1928–1931)
    - Herbert Ernest Hart, administrator (1931–1935)
    - Alfred Turnbull, administrator (1935–1946)
    - Francis Voelcker, administrator (1946–1949)
    - Guy Powles, administrator (1949–1960)
    - John Wright, administrator (1960–1965)
    - Paul Gabites, administrator (1965–1968)
    - Richard Taylor, administrator (1968–1971)
    - Duncan MacIntyre, administrator (1971–1972)
    - Matiu Rata, administrator (1972–1973)
    - Gray Thorp, administrator (1973–1975)
    - Frank Henry Corner, administrator (1975–1984)
    - Harold Huyton Francis, administrator (1984–1988)
    - Neil Walter, administrator (1988–1990)
    - Graham Keith Ansell, administrator (1990–1992)
    - Brian Absolum, administrator (1992–1993)
    - Lindsay Johnstone Watt, administrator (1993–2003)
  - Heads of government
    - Lepaio Simi, Head of government (1992–1993)
    - Salesio Lui, Head of government (1993–1994)
    - Kerisiano Neemia, Head of government (1994–1995)
    - Kuresa Nasau, Head of government (1995–1996)
    - Pio Tuia, Head of government (1996–1997)
    - Falima Teao, Head of government (1997–1998)
    - Kuresa Nasau, Head of government (1998–1999)
    - Pio Tuia, Head of government (1999–2000)
    - Kolouei O'Brien, Head of government (2000–2001)

== Norway ==
Norway

  - Monarchs
  - Prime ministers
- Svalbard, territory
  - Governors
    - Johannes Gerckens Bassøe, Governor (1925–1933)
    - Helge Ingstad, Acting Governor (1933–1935)
    - Wolmar Tycho Marlow, Governor (1935–1941)
    - Håkon Balstad, Governor (1945–1956)
    - Odd Birketvedt, Governor (1956–1960)
    - Finn Backer Midtbøe, Governor (1960–1963)
    - Tollef Landsverk, Governor (1963–1967)
    - Stephen Stephensen, Governor (1967–1970)
    - Fredrik Beichmann, Governor (1970–1974)
    - Leif Eldring, Governor (1974–1978)
    - Jan Grøndahl, Governor (1978–1982)
    - Carl Alexander Wendt, Governor (1982–1985)
    - Leif Eldring, Governor (1985–1991)
    - Odd Blomdal, Governor (1991–1995)
    - Ann-Kristin Olsen, Governor (1995–1998)
    - Morten Ruud, Governor (1998–2001)

== Portugal ==
Kingdom of Portugal, First Portuguese Republic, Ditadura Nacional, Second Portuguese Republic, Third Portuguese Republic
Portuguese colonial empire

  - Monarchs
  - Presidents
  - Prime ministers

Africa

- Portuguese Angola
  - Governors general, High commissioners
    - Francisco Xavier Cabral de Oliveira Moncada, Governor general (1900–1903)
    - Eduardo Augusto Ferreira da Costa, Governor general (1903–1904)
    - Custódio Miguel de Borja, Governor general (1904)
    - António Duarte Ramada Curto, Governor general (1904–1905)
    - Caminho de Ferro de Mossámedes, Governor general (1905–1906)
    - Eduardo Augusto Ferreira da Costa, Governor general (1906–1907)
    - Henrique Mitchell de Paiva, Governor general (1907–1909)
    - Álvaro António da Costa Ferreira, Governor general (1909)
    - José Augusto Alves Roçadas, Governor general (1909–1910)
    - Caetano Francisco Cláudio Eugénio Gonçalves, Governor general (1910–1911)
    - Manuel Maria Coelho, Governor general (1911–1912)
    - José Mendes Ribeiro Norton de Matos, Governor general (1912–1915)
    - António Júlio da Costa Pereira de Eça, Governor general (1915–1916)
    - Pedro Francisco Massano do Amorim, Governor general (1916–1917)
    - Jaime Alberto de Castro Morais, Governor general (1917–1918)
    - Filomeno da Câmara Melo Cabral, Governor general (1918–1919)
    - Mimoso Guera, Governor general (1919–1920)
    - Visconde de Pedralva, Governor general (1920–1921)
    - João Mendes Ribeiro Norton de Matos, High commissioner (1921–1924)
    - João Augusto Crispiniano Soares, High commissioner (1924)
    - Antero Tavares de Carvalho, High commissioner (1924–1925)
    - Francisco Cunha Rêgo Cháves, High commissioner (1925–1926)
    - António Vicente Ferreira, High commissioner (1926–1928)
    - António Damas Mora, High commissioner (1928–1929)
    - Filomeno da Câmara Melo Cabral, High commissioner (1929–1930)
    - José Dionísio Carneiro de Sousa e Faro, High commissioner (1930–1931)
    - Eduardo Ferreira Viana, High commissioner (1931–1934)
    - Júlio Garcês de Lencastre, High commissioner (1934–1935)
    - António Lopes Matheus, High commissioner (1935–1939)
    - Manoel da Cunha e Costa Marquês Mano, High commissioner (1939–1941)
    - Abel de Abreu Souto-Maior, High commissioner (1941–1942)
    - Álvaro de Freitas Morna, High commissioner (1942–1943)
    - Manuel Pereira Figueira, High commissioner (1943)
    - Vasco Lopes Alves, High commissioner (1943–1947)
    - Fernando Falcão Pacheco Mena, High commissioner (1947)
    - José Agapito de Silva Carvalho, High commissioner (1948–1955)
    - Manoel de Gusmão Mascarenhas Gaivão, High commissioner (1955–1956)
    - Horácio José de Sá Viana Rebelo, High commissioner (1956–1960)
    - Álvaro Rodrigues da Silva Tavares, High commissioner (1960–1961)
    - Verâncio Augusto Deslandes, High commissioner (1961–1962)
    - Silvino Silvério Marquês, High commissioner (1962–1966)
    - Camilo Augusto de Miranda Rebocho Vaz, High commissioner (1966–1972)
    - Fernando Augusto Santos e Castro, High commissioner (1972–1974)
    - Joaquín Franco Pinheiro, High commissioner (1974)
    - Silvino Silvério Marquês, High commissioner (1974)
    - António Alva Rosa Coutinho, High commissioner (1974–1975)
    - Ernesto Ferreira de Macedo, High commissioner (1975)
    - Leonel Silva Cardoso, High commissioner (1975)
- Portuguese Cape Verde
  - Governors
    - Arnaldo de Novalis Guedes de Rebelo, Governor (1901–1902)
    - Francisco de Paula Cid, Governor (1902–1903)
    - António Alfredo Barjona de Freitas, Governor (1903–1904)
    - Amâncio Alpoim de Cerqueira Borges Cabral, Governor (1905–1907)
    - Bernardo António da Costa de Macedo, Governor (1907–1909)
    - Martinho Pinto de Queirós Montenegro, Governor (1909–1910)
    - António de Macedo Ramalho Ortigão, Governor (1910–1911)
    - Artur Marinha de Campos, Governor (1911–1911)
    - Joaquím Pedro Vieira Índice Bicker, Governor (1911–1915)
    - Abel Fontoura da Costa, Governor (1915–1918)
    - Teófilo Duarte, Governor (1918–1919)
    - Manuel Firmino de Almeida da Maia Magalhães, Governor (1919–1921)
    - Filipe Carlos Dias de Carvalho, Governor (1921–1922)
    - Júlio Henriques d'Abreu, Governor (1924–1926)
    - João de Almeida, Governor (1927–1927)
    - António Álvares Guedes Vaz, Governor (1927–1931)
    - Amadeu Gomes de Figueiredo, Governor (1931–1941)
    - José Diogo Ferreira Martins, Governor (1941–1943)
    - João de Figueiredo, Governor (1943–1949)
    - Carlos Alberto Garcia Alves Roçadas, Governor (1950–1953)
    - Manuel Marques de Abrantes Amaral, Governor (1953–1957)
    - António Augusto Peixoto Correia, Acting Governor (1957–1958)
    - Silvino Silvério Marques, Governor (1958–1962)
    - Leão Maria Tavares Rosado do Sacramento Monteiro, Governor (1963–1969)
    - António Lopes dos Santos, Governor (1969–1974)
    - Henrique da Silva Horta, Governor (1974)
    - Vicente Almeida d'Eça, Governor (1974), High Commissioner (1974–1975)
- Portuguese Guinea
  - Governors
    - António de Spínola, Governor (1968–1973)
- Portuguese Mozambique
  - High commissioners and Governors general
    - Manuel Rafael Gorjão, Governor general (1900–1902)
    - Tomás António Garcia Rosado, Governor general (1902–1905)
    - João António de Azevedo Coutinho Fragoso de Sequeira, Governor general (1905–1906)
    - Alfredo Augusto Freire de Andrade, Governor general (1906–1910)
    - José de Freitas Ribeiro, Acting Governor general (1910–1911)
    - José Francisco de Azevedo e Silva, Governor general (1911–1912)
    - Alfredo Afonso Meneses de Magalhães, Governor general (1912–1913)
    - Augusto Ferreira dos Santos, Governor general (1913–1914)
    - Joaquim José Machado, Governor general (1914–1915)
    - Alfredo Baptista Coelho, Governor general (1915)
    - Álvaro Xavier de Castro, Governor general (1915–1918)
    - Pedro Francisco Massano do Amorim, Governor general (1918–1919)
    - Manuel Juiz Moreira da Fonseca, Acting Governor general (1919–1921)
    - Manuel de Brito Camacho, High commissioner and Governor general (1921–1923)
    - Manuel Juiz Moreira da Fonseca, Acting High commissioner and Governor general (1923–1924)
    - Víctor Hugo de Azevedo Coutinho, High commissioner and Governor general (1924–1926)
    - Artur Ivens Ferraz, Acting High commissioner and Governor general (1926)
    - José Ricardo Pereira Cabral, High commissioner and Governor general (1926–1938)
    - José Nicolau Nunes de Oliveira, High commissioner and Governor general (1938–1941)
    - João Tristão de Bettencourt, High commissioner and Governor general (1941–1946)
    - Luís de Sousa e Vasconcelos e Funchal, High commissioner and Governor general (1947–1948)
    - Gabriel Mauricio Teixeira, High commissioner and Governor general (1948–1951)
  - Overseas Province of Portugal
    - Gabriel Maurício Teixeira, High commissioner and Governor general (1951–1958)
    - Pedro Correia de Barros, High commissioner and Governor general (1958–1961)
    - Manuel Maria Sarmento Rodrigues, High commissioner and Governor general (1961–1964)
    - José Augusto da Costa Almeida, High commissioner and Governor general (1964–1968)
    - Baltazar Rebelo de Sousa, High commissioner and Governor general (1968–1970)
    - Eduardo Arantes e Oliveira, High commissioner and Governor general (1970–1972)
    - Manuel Pimentel Pereira dos Santos, High commissioner and Governor general (1972–1974)
    - David Teixeira Ferreira, Acting High commissioner and Governor general (1974)
    - Henrique Soares de Melo, High commissioner and Governor general (1974)
    - Jorge Ferro Ribeiro, Acting High commissioner and Governor general (1974)
    - Vítor Crespo, High commissioner and Governor general (1974)
  - local administration
    - Vítor Crespo, High commissioner and Governor general (1974–1975)
- Portuguese São Tomé and Príncipe
  - Governors
  - Crown colony
    - Amâncio de Alpoim Cerqueira Borges Cabral, Governor (1899–1901)
    - Francisco Maria Peixoto Vieira, Acting Governor (1901)
    - Joaquim Xavier de Brito, Governor (1901–1902)
    - João Abel Antunes Mesquita Guimarães, Governor (1902–1903)
    - João Gregório Duarte Ferreira, Acting Governor (1903)
    - Francisco de Paula Cid, Governor (1903–1907)
    - Vitor Augusto Chaves Lemos e Melo, Acting Governor (1907)
    - Pedro Berquó, Governor (1907–1908)
    - Vítor Augusto Chaves Lemos e Mel, Acting Governor (1908–1909)
    - José Augusto Vieira da Fonseca, Governor (1909–1910)
    - Jaime Daniel Leote do Rego, Governor (1910)
    - Fernando Augusto de Carvalho, Governor (1910)
    - Carlos de Mendonça Pimentel e Melo, Acting Governor (1910)
    - António Pinto Miranda Guedes, Governor (1910–1911)
    - Jaime Daniel Leote do Rego, Governor (1911)
    - Mariano Martins, Governor (1911–1913)
    - Pedro do Amaral Boto Machado, Governor (1913–1915)
    - José Dionísio Carneiro de Sousa e Faro, Governor (1915)
    - Rafael dos Santos Oliveira, Acting Governor (1915–1918)
    - João Gregório Duarte Ferreira, Governor (1918–1919)
    - Avelino Augusto de Oliveira Leite, Governor (1919–1920)
    - José Augusto de Conceição Alves Vélez, Acting Governor (1920)
    - Eduardo Nogueira de Lemos, Acting Governor (1920–1921)
    - António José Pereira, Governor (1921–1924)
    - Eugénio de Barros Soares Branco, Governor (1924–1926)
    - José Duarte Junqueira Rato, Governor (1926–1928)
    - Sebastião José Barbosa, Acting Governor (1928–1929)
    - Francisco Penteado, Governor (1929)
    - Luís Augusto Vieira Fernandes, Governor (1929–1933)
    - Ricardo Vaz Monteiro, Governor (1933–1941)
    - Amadeu Gomes de Figueiredo, Governor (1941–1945)
    - Carlos de Sousa Gorgulho, Governor (1945–1948)
    - Afonso Manuel Machado de Sousa, Acting Governor (1948–1950)
    - Mário José Cabral Oliveira Castro, Acting Governor (1950–1951)
  - Overseas province
    - Mário José Cabral Oliveira Castro, Acting Governor (1951–1952)
    - Guilherme António Amaral Abranches Pinto, Acting Governor (1952–1953)
    - Fernando Augusto Rodrigues, Acting Governor (1953)
    - Afonso Manuel Machado de Sousa, Acting Governor (1953)
    - Francisco António Pires Barata, Governor (1953–1954)
    - Luís da Câmara Leme Faria, Acting Governor (1954–1955)
    - José Machado, Acting Governor (1955–1956)
    - Octávio Ferreira Gonçalves, Acting Governor (1956–1957)
    - Manuel Marques de Abrantes Amaral, Governor (1957–1963)
    - Alberto Monteiro de Sousa Campos, Acting Governor (1963)
    - António Jorge da Silva Sebastião, Governor (1963–1972)
    - João Cecilio Gonçalves, Governor (1973–1974)
    - António Elísio Capelo Pires Veloso, Governor (1974)
  - Autonomous province
    - António Elísio Capelo Pires Veloso, High Commissioner (1974–1975)

Asia

- Portuguese Macau
  - Governors
    - José Garcia Leandro, Governor (1974–1979)
    - Melo Egídio, Governor (1979–1981)
    - José Carlos Moreira Campos, Acting Governor (1981)
    - Vasco de Almeida e Costa, Governor (1981–1986)

Oceania

- Azores, autonomous region
  - Representatives of the Portuguese Republic
  - Presidents of the Government
    - João Bosco Mota Amaral, President (1976–1995)
    - Alberto Madruga da Costa, President (1995–1996)
    - Carlos César, President (1996–2012)
- Portuguese Timor
  - Governors
    - José Nogueira Valente Pires, Governor (1968–1972)

== South Africa ==
Union of South Africa, Republic of South Africa

  - Heads of state
  - Prime ministers
- South West Africa
  - Administrators
    - Johannes Gert Hendrik van der Wath, administrator (1968–1971)
    - Marthinus T. Steyn, administrator general (1977–1979)
    - Gerrit Viljoen, administrator general (1979–1980)
    - Danie Hough, administrator general (1980–1983)

== United Kingdom ==
United Kingdom of Great Britain and Ireland, United Kingdom of Great Britain and Northern Ireland
British colonial empire

  - Monarchs
  - Prime ministers

=== Africa ===
- Basutoland
  - Paramount chiefs
    - Nathaniel Griffith Lerotholi, Paramount chief (1913–1939)
  - High commissioners
    - Herbert John Gladstone, High commissioner for Southern Africa (1910–1914)
    - Sydney Buxton, High commissioner for Southern Africa (1914–1920)
  - Resident commissioners
    - Herbert Sloley, Resident commissioner (1902–1916)
- Barotziland-North-Western Rhodesia
    - Robert Thorne Coryndon, administrator (1897–1907)
    - Hugh Hole, administrator (1907)
    - John Carden, acting administrator (1907–1908)
    - Robert Edward Codrington, administrator (1908)
    - Lawrence Aubrey Wallace, administrator (1909–1911)
- Bechuanaland
  - High Commissioner for Southern Africa
    - Herbert Gladstone, High commissioner (1910–1914)
  - Resident commissioners
    - Francis William Panzera, Resident Commissioner (1906–1916)
    - Charles Fernand Rey, Resident commissioner (1930–1937)
    - Charles Noble Arden-Clarke, Resident commissioner (1937–1942)
  - High commissioners
    - Herbert John Gladstone High commissioner for Southern Africa (1910–1914)
    - Sydney Buxton High commissioner for Southern Africa (1914–1920)
- East Africa Protectorate
  - Governors
    - James Hayes Sadler, Governor (1905–1909)
    - Henry Conway Belfield, Governor (1912–1917)
- Khedivate of Egypt, occupied territory
  - British agents
    - Herbert Kitchener, British Consul general (1911–1914)
    - Milne Cheetham, Acting High commissioner (1914–1915)
  - Khedives
    - Abbas Helmy Pasha, Khedive (1892–1914)
    - Hussein Kamel, Khedive/Sultan (1914–1917)
  - Prime ministers
    - Mohamed Said Pasha, Prime minister (1910–1914)
    - Hussein Roshdy Pasha, Prime minister (1914–1919)
- The Gambia
  - Governors
    - Henry Lionel Galway, Governor (1911–1914)
    - Edward John Cameron, Governor (1914–1920)
- Gold Coast
  - Governors
    - Hugh Charles Clifford, Governor (1912–1919)
- British Kenya
  - Governors
    - Joseph Aloysius Byrne, Governor (1931–1936)
    - Armigel de Vins Wade, Governor (1936–1937)
    - Robert Brooke-Popham, Governor (1937–1939)
- Nigeria
  - Governors
    - Bernard Henry Bourdillon, Governor (1935–1940)
- Nyasaland
  - Governors
    - George Smith, Governor (1913–1923)
    - Harold Baxter Kittermaster, Governor (1934–1939)
- North-Eastern Rhodesia
    - Robert Edward Codrington, administrator (1898–1907)
    - Lawrence Aubrey Wallace, administrator (1907–1909)
    - Leicester Paul Beaufort, administrator (1909–1911)
    - Hugh Charlie Marshall, acting administrator (1911)
- Northern Rhodesia
  - Governors
    - Hugh Charlie Marshall, acting administrator (1911)
    - Lawrence Aubrey Wallace, administrator (1911–1921)
    - Francis Chaplin, administrator (1921–1923)
    - Richard Goode, acting administrator (1923–1924)
    - Herbert Stanley, Governor (1924–1927)
    - Richard Goode, acting Governor (1927)
    - James Crawford Maxwell, Governor (1927–1932)
    - Ronald Storrs, Governor (1932–1935)
    - Hubert Winthrop Young, Governor (1935–1938)
    - John Alexander Maybin, Governor (1938–1941)
    - William Marston Logan, Acting Governor (1941)
    - Eubule John Waddington, Governor (1941–1947)
    - Robert Stanley, acting Governor (1947–1948)
    - Gilbert McCall Rennie, Governor (1948–1954)
    - Alexander Thomas Williams, acting Governor (1954)
    - Arthur Benson, Governor (1954–1959)
    - Evelyn Dennison Hone, Governor (1959–1964)
  - Prime ministers
    - Kenneth Kaunda, Prime minister (1964)
- Southern Rhodesia
  - Governors
    - Fraser Russell, Governor (1934–1935)
    - Herbert Stanley, Governor (1935–1942)
    - Christopher Soames, Governor (1979–1980)
- Anglo-Egyptian Sudan
  - Governors
    - Knox Helm, Governor general (1954–1955)
- Uganda Protectorate
  - Governors
    - Bernard Henry Bourdillon, Governor (1932–1935)
    - Philip Euen Mitchell, Governor (1935–1940)

=== Asia ===
- Aden Colony
  - Governors
    - Bernard Rawdon Reilly, Governor (1937–1940)
    - John Hathorn Hall, Governor (1940–1945)
    - Reginald Champion, Governor (1945–1950)
    - William Goode, acting Governor (1950–1951)
    - Tom Hickinbotham, Governor (1951–1956)
    - William Luce, Governor (1956–1960)
    - Charles Johnston, Governor (1960–1963)
- Federation of South Arabia
  - High commissioners
    - Charles Johnston, High commissioner (1963)
    - Kennedy Trevaskis, High commissioner (1963–1964)
    - Richard Turnbull, High commissioner (1964–1967)
    - Humphrey Trevelyan, High commissioner (1967)
  - Chief ministers
    - Hassan Ali Bayumi, Chief minister (1963)
    - Zayn Abdu Baharun, Chief minister (1963–1965)
    - Abdel-Qawi Hasan Makkawi, Chief minister (1965)
    - Ali Musa al-Babakr, Chief minister (1965–1966)
    - Salih al-Awadli, Chief minister (1966–1967)
- Bahrain Protectorate
  - Native monarchs
    - `Isa ibn Ali Al Khalifah, Hakim (1869–1932)
    - Sheikh Isa ibn Salman Al Khalifah, Hakim (1961–1999)
  - Prime ministers
    - Khalifah ibn Sulman Al Khalifah, President of the State council (1970–present)
  - Chief political residents of the Persian Gulf
    - Stewart Crawford, Chief political resident (1966–1970)
    - Geoffrey Arthur, Chief political resident (1970–1971)
  - British political agents
    - Arthur Prescott Trevor, British political agent (1912–1914)
    - Terence Humphrey Keyes, British political agent (1914–1916)
  - British political agents
    - Alexander John Stirling, British political agent (1969–1971)
- Brunei Protectorate
  - Administrators
    - Francis William Douglas, Resident Administrator (1913–1915)
    - Arthur Robin Adair, High commissioner (1968–1972)
    - James Alfred Davidson, High commissioner (1975–1978)
    - Arthur Christopher Watson, High commissioner (1978–1984)
  - Sultans
    - Muhammad Jamalul Alam, Sultan (1906–1924)
    - Hassanal Bolkiah, Sultan (1967–present)
  - Chief ministers
    - Yura Halim, Chief minister (1967–1972)
    - Pengiran Dipa Negara Laila Diraja Pengiran Abdul Mumin, Chief minister (1972–1981)
    - Pehin Orang Kaya Laila Wijaya Dato Haji Abdul Aziz Umar, Chief minister (1981–1983)
- British Ceylon
  - Governors
    - Reginald Edward Stubbs, Governor (1933–1937)
    - Andrew Caldecott, Governor (1937–1944)
- British Hong Kong
    - Francis Henry May, Governor (1912–1919)
    - William Peel, Governor (1930–1935)
    - Andrew Caldecott, Governor (1935–1937)
    - Geoffry Northcote, Governor (1937–1941)
    - David Clive Crosbie Trench, Governor (1964–1971)
    - MacLehose of Beoch, Governor (1971–1982)
    - Hugh Norman-Walker, Acting Governor (1971)
    - Murray MacLehose, Governor (1971–1982)
- British India
  - Viceroy of India
    - Charles Hardinge, Viceroy and Governor general (1910–1916)
    - Freeman Freeman-Thomas, Viceroy and Governor general (1931–1936)
    - Victor Hope, Viceroy and Governor general (1936–1943)
- Kuwait, British protectorate
  - Emirs
    - Mubarak al-Lahab Al Sabah, Emir (1896–1915)
  - British political agents
    - William Henry Irvine Shakespear, British political agent (1909–1914)
    - William George Grey, British political agent (1914–1916)
- Qatar
  - British political agents
    - Edward Henderson, British political agent (1969–1971)
  - Monarchs
    - Sheikh Ahmad bin Ali Al Thani, Hakim (1960–1972)
  - Prime ministers
    - Sheikh Khalifa bin Hamad Al Thani, Prime minister (1970–1995)
- Straits Settlement
    - John Anderson, Governor (1904–1911)
    - Shenton Thomas, Governor (1934–1942)
- Trucial States, Protectorate
  - British political agents
    - Julian Bullard, British political agent (1968–1970)

=== British Isles ===
- Guernsey, Crown dependency
  - British monarchs are the Dukes of Normandy
  - Lieutenant governors
    - Michael Saward, Lieutenant governor (1899–1903)
    - Barrington Campbell, Lieutenant governor (1903–1908)
    - Robert Auld, Lieutenant governor (1908–1911)
    - Edward Hamilton, Lieutenant governor (1911–1914)
    - Henry Merrick Lawson, Lieutenant governor (1914)
    - Reginald Clare Hart, Lieutenant governor (1914–1918)
    - Launcelot Kiggell, Lieutenant governor (1918–1920)
    - John Capper, Lieutenant governor (1920–1925)
    - Charles Sackville-West, Lieutenant governor (1925–1929)
    - Walter Hore-Ruthven, Lieutenant governor (1929–1934)
    - Edward Broadbent, Lieutenant governor (1934–1939)
    - Alexander Telfer-Smollett, Lieutenant governor (1939–1940)
    - John Minshull-Ford, Lieutenant governor (1940)
    - German occupation of the Channel Islands (1940–1945)
    - Charles Gage Stuart, Lieutenant governor (1945)
    - Philip Neame, Lieutenant governor (1945–1953)
    - Thomas Elmhirst, Lieutenant governor (1953–1958)
    - Geoffrey Robson, Lieutenant governor (1958–1964)
    - Charles Coleman, Lieutenant governor (1964–1969)
    - Charles Mills, Lieutenant governor (1969–1974)
    - John Martin, Lieutenant governor (1974–1980)
    - Peter Le Cheminant, Lieutenant governor (1980–1985)
    - Alexander Boswell, Lieutenant governor (1985–1990)
    - Michael Wilkins, Lieutenant governor (1990–1994)
    - John Coward, Lieutenant governor (1994–2000)
    - John Paul Foley, Lieutenant governor (2000–2005)
  - Bailiffs
    - Thomas Godfrey Carey, Bailiff (1895–1902)
    - Henry Alexander Giffard, Bailiff (1902–1908)
    - William Carey, Bailiff (1908–1915)
    - Edward Chepmell Ozanne, Bailiff (1915–1922)
    - Havilland Walter de Sausmarez, Bailiff (1922–1929)
    - Arthur William Bell, Bailiff (1929–1935)
    - Victor Carey, Bailiff (1935–1946)
    - Ambrose Sherwill, Bailiff (1946–1959)
    - William Arnold, Bailiff (1959–1973)
    - John Loveridge, Bailiff (1973–1982)
    - Charles Frossard, Bailiff (1982–1992)
    - Graham Martyn Dorey, Bailiff (1992–1999)
    - de Vic Carey, Bailiff (1999–2005)
  - Alderney, self-governing island of Guernsey
    - Presidents of the states
      - Sydney Peck Herivel, President of the states (1949–1970)
      - George William Baron, President of the states (1970–1977)
      - Jon Kay-Mouat, President of the states (1977–1994)
      - George William Baron, President of the states (1994–1997)
      - Jon Kay-Mouat, President of the states (1997–2002)
  - Sark, self-governing island of Guernsey
    - Seigneurs
      - William Frederick Collings, Seigneur (1882–1927)
      - Sibyl Hathaway, Seigneur (1927–1974)
      - Robert Hathaway, Seigneur (1929–1954)
- Jersey, Crown dependency
  - British monarchs are the Dukes of Normandy
  - Lieutenant governors
    - Alexander Nelson Rochefort, Lieutenant governor (1910–1916)
    - John Gilbert Davi, Lieutenant governor (1969–1974)
    - Desmond Fitzpatrick, Lieutenant governor (1974–1979)
    - Peter Whiteley, Lieutenant governor (1979–1985)
    - Michael Wilkes, Lieutenant governor (1995–2001)
  - Bailiffs
    - William Henry Venables-Vernon, Bailiff (1899–1931)
    - Robert Hugh Le Masurier, Bailiff (1962–1974)
    - Frank Ereaut, Bailiff (1975–1985)
    - Philip Bailhache, Bailiff (1995–2009)
- Isle of Man, Crown dependency
  - British monarchs are the Lords of Mann
  - Lieutenant governors
    - George Somerset, Lieutenant governor (1902–1918)
    - Peter Stallard, Lieutenant governor (1966–1974)
    - John Warburton Paul, Lieutenant governor (1974–1980)
    - Nigel Cecil, Lieutenant governor (1980–1985)
    - Ian Macfadyen, Lieutenant governor (2000–2005)
  - Chairmen of the Executive council
    - Norman Crowe, Chairman of the Executive council (1967–1971)
    - Clifford Irving, Chairman of the Executive council (1977–1981)
    - Percy Radcliffe, Chairman of the Executive council (1981–1985)
  - Chief ministers
    - Miles Walker, Chief minister (1986–1996)
    - Donald Gelling, Chief minister 1996–2001)
- Northern Ireland, part of the United Kingdom of Great Britain and Northern Ireland (from 1922); subject to direct rule 1972–98
  - British monarchs are the Monarchs of Northern Ireland
  - Governor of Northern Ireland
    - James Hamilton, 3rd Duke of Abercorn (1922–45)
    - William Leveson-Gower, 4th Earl Granville (1945–52)
    - John Loder, 2nd Baron Wakehurst (1952–64)
    - John Erskine, 1st Baron Erskine of Rerrick (1964–68)
    - Ralph Grey, Baron Grey of Naunton (1968–72)
  - Secretary of State for Northern Ireland
    - Willie Whitelaw (1972–73)
    - Francis Pym (1973–74)
    - Merlyn Rees (1974–76)
    - Roy Mason (1976–79)
    - Humphrey Atkins (1979–81)
    - Jim Prior (1981–84)
    - Douglas Hurd (1984–85)
    - Tom King (1985–89)
    - Peter Brooke (1989–92)
    - Patrick Mayhew (1992–97)
    - Mo Mowlam (1997–99)
    - Peter Mandelson (1999–2001)

=== Caribbean and Central America ===
- Anguilla, overseas territory
  - Governors
    - Charles Henry Godden, Governor (1982–1983)
    - Alastair Turner Baillie, Governor (1983–1987)
    - Geoffrey Owen Whittaker, Governor (1987–1989)
    - Brian George John Canty, Governor (1989–1992)
    - Alan W. Shave, Governor (1992–1995)
    - Alan Hoole, Governor (1995–1996)
    - Robert Harris, Governor (1996–2000)
    - Roger Cousins, Acting Governor (2000)
    - Peter Johnstone, Governor (2000–2004)
  - Chief ministers
    - Ronald Webster, Chief minister (1976–1977)
    - Emile Gumbs, Chief minister (1977–1980)
    - Ronald Webster, Chief minister (1980–1984)
    - Emile Gumbs, Chief minister (1984–1994)
    - Hubert Hughes, Chief minister (1994–2000)
    - Osbourne Fleming, Chief minister (2000–2010)
- Antigua and Barbuda
  - Governors
    - Wilfred Jacobs, Governor (1967–1993), Governor (1967–1981)
  - Chief ministers
    - Vere Bird, Chief minister (1960–1967), Premier (1967–1971)
    - Vere Bird, Premier (1976–1994)
- Crown Colony of the Bahamas
  - Governors
    - Gilbert Thomas Carter, Governor (1898–1904)
    - William Grey-Wilson, Governor (1904–1912)
    - George Haddon-Smith, Governor (1912–1914)
    - William Allardyce, Governor (1914–1920)
    - Harry Edward Spiller Cordeaux, Governor (1920–1926)
    - Charles William James Orr, Governor (1927–1932)
    - Bede Edmund Hugh Clifford, Governor (1932–1934)
    - Charles Dundas, Governor (1934–1940)
    - Edward VIII, Governor (1940–1945)
    - William Lindsay Murphy, Governor (1945–1950)
    - George Ritchie Sandford, Governor (1950)
    - Robert Arthur Ross Neville, Governor (1950–1953)
    - Daniel Knox, Governor (1953–1956)
    - Oswald Raynor Arthur, Governor (1957–1960)
    - Robert Stapeldon, Governor (1960–1964)
    - Ralph Grey, Baron Grey of Naunton, Governor (1964–1968)
    - Francis Hovell-Thurlow-Cumming-Bruce, Governor (1968–1972)
  - Prime ministers
    - Lynden Pindling, Premier (1967–1992), Premier (1967–1969), Prime minister (1969–1973)
- Colony of Barbados
  - Governors
    - Frederick Mitchell Hodgson, Governor (1900–1904)
    - Gilbert Thomas Carter, Governor (1904–1911)
    - Leslie Probyn, Governor (1911–1918)
    - Charles Richard Mackey O'Brien, Governor (1918–1925)
    - William Charles Fleming Robertson, Governor (1925–1933)
    - Harry Scott Newlands, Governor (1933)
    - Mark Aitchison Young, Governor (1933–1938)
    - Eubule John Waddington, Governor (1938–1941)
    - Henry Grattan Bushe, Governor (1941–1947)
    - Hilary Rudolph Robert Blood, Governor (1947–1949)
    - Alfred Savage, Governor (1949–1953)
    - Robert Arundell, Governor (1953–1959)
    - John Montague Stow, Governor (1959–1966)
- British Honduras / Belize
  - Governors
    - Wilfred Collet, Governor (1913–1918)
    - John Warburton Paul, Governor (1966–1972)
    - Peter Donovan McEntee, Governor (1976–1980)
    - James Hennessy, Governor (1980–1981)
  - Premiers
    - George Cadle Price, Premier (1964–1981)
- Cayman Islands, overseas territory
  - Commissioners, administrators, Governors
    - Frederick Shedden Sanguinnetti, Commissioner (1898–1907)
    - George Stephenson Hirst, Commissioner (1907–1912)
    - Arthur C Robinson, Commissioner (1912–1919)
    - Hugh Houston Hutchings, Commissioner (1919–1929)
    - Captain G. H. Frith, Commissioner (1929–1931)
    - Ernest Arthur Weston, Commissioner (1931–1934)
    - Allen Wosley Cardinall, Commissioner (1934–1940)
    - Albert C. Panton Snr, Acting Commissioner (1940–1941)
    - John Perry Jones, Commissioner (1941–1946)
    - Ivor Otterbein Smith, Commissioner (1946–1952)
    - Andrew Morris Gerrard, Commissioner (1952–1956)
    - Alan Hillard Donald, Commissioner (1956–1959), administrator (1959–1960)
    - Jack Rose, administrator (1960–1964)
    - John Alfred Cumber Kt, administrator (1964–1968)
    - Athelstan Charles Ethelwulf Long, administrator (1968–1971), Governor (1971–1972)
    - Kenneth Roy Crook, Governor (1972–1974)
    - Thomas Russell, Governor (1974–1982)
    - George Peter Lloyd, Governor (1982–1987)
    - Alan James Scott, Governor (1987–1992)
    - Michael Edward John Gore, Governor (1992–1995)
    - John Wynne Owen, Governor (1995–1999)
    - Peter Smith, Governor (1999–2002)
  - Leaders of government business
    - Thomas Jefferson, Leader of government business (1992–1994)
    - Truman Bodden, Leader of government business (1994–2000)
    - Kurt Tibbetts, Leader of government business (2000–2001)
- British Dominica
  - Governors
    - Louis Cools-Lartigue, Governor (1968–1978)
  - Prime ministers
    - Patrick John, Prime minister (1974–1979)
- British Grenada
  - Governors
  - Premiers, Prime ministers
    - Eric Gairy, Premier (1967–1974), Prime minister (1974–1978)
- Colony of Jamaica
  - Governors
    - Augustus William Lawson Hemming, Governor (1898–1904)
    - Sydney Olivier, Acting Governor (1904)
    - Hugh Clarence Bourne, Acting Governor (1904)
    - James Alexander Swettenham, Governor (1904–1907)
    - Hugh Clarence Bourne, Acting Governor (1907)
    - Sydney Olivier, Acting Governor (1907–1913)
    - Philip Clark Cork, Acting Governor (1913)
    - William Henry Manning, Governor (1913–1918)
    - Robert Johnstone, Acting Governor (1918)
    - Leslie Probyn, Governor (1918–1924)
    - Herbert Bryan, Acting Governor (1924)
    - Samuel Herbert Wilson, Governor (1924–1925)
    - Herbert Bryan, Acting Governor (1925)
    - Arthur Jeff, Acting Governor (1925–1926)
    - Reginald Edward Stubbs, Governor (1926–1932)
    - Arthur Jelf, Acting Governor (1932)
    - Alexander Ransford Slater, Governor (1932–1934)
    - A. S. Jeef, Acting Governor (1934)
    - Edward Brandis Denham, Governor (1934–1938)
    - Charles Campbell Woolley, Acting Governor (1938)
    - Arthur Richards, Governor (1938–1943)
    - William Henry Flinn, Acting Governor (1943)
    - John Huggins, Governor (1943–1951)
    - Hugh Mackintosh Foot, Governor (1951–1957)
    - Kenneth Blackburne, Governor (1957–1962)
- British Leeward Islands
  - Governors
    - Henry Hesketh Bell, Governor (1912–1916)
    - Gordon James Lethem, Governor (1936–1941)
- Montserrat, overseas territory
  - Governors
    - Dennis Raleigh Gibbs, administrator (1964–1971)
    - Willoughby Harry Thompson, Governor (1971–1974)
    - Norman Derek Matthews, Governor (1974–1976)
    - Gwilyum Wyn Jones, Governor (1977–1980)
    - David Kenneth Hay Dale, Governor (1980–1984)
    - Arthur Christopher Watson, Governor (1985–1987)
    - Christopher J. Turner, Governor (1987–1990)
    - David G. P. Taylor, Governor (1990–1993)
    - Frank Savage, Governor (1993–1997)
    - Tony Abbott, Governor (1997–2001)
  - Chief ministers
    - William Henry Bramble, Chief minister (1960–1970)
    - Percival Austin Bramble, Chief minister (1970–1978)
    - John Osborne, Chief minister (1978–1991)
    - Reuben Meade, Chief minister (1991–1996)
    - Bertrand Osborne, Chief minister (1996–1997)
    - David Brandt, Chief minister (1997–2001)
- Saint Vincent and the Grenadines
  - Administrators, Governors
    - Arthur Grimble, administrator (1933–1936)
    - Hywel George, Governor (1967–1970)
    - Rupert John, Governor (1970–1976)
    - Sydney Gun-Munro, Governor (1976–1979), Governor general (1979–1985)
  - Chief ministers, Premiers
    - Milton Cato, Chief minister (1967–1969), Premier (1969–1972)
    - Milton Cato, Premier (1974–1984)
- Saint Christopher-Nevis-Anguilla
  - Governors
    - Milton Allan, Governor (1969–1975)
    - Probyn Ellsworth-Innis, Governor (1975–1981)
- Saint Christopher and Nevis
  - Governors
    - Probyn Ellsworth-Innis, Governor (1975–1981)
    - Clement Arrindell, Governor (1981–1995)
  - Premiers
    - Robert Bradshaw, Premier (1966–1978)
    - Paul Southwell, Premier (1978–1979)
    - Lee Moore, Premier (1979–1980)
    - Kennedy Simmonds, Premier (1980–1995)
- Saint Lucia
  - Governors
    - Frederick Clarke, Governor (1967–1971)
    - Allen Montgomery Lewis, Governor (1974–1979), Governor general (1979–1980)
  - Premiers
    - John Compton, Premier (1964–1979)
- Trinidad and Tobago
  - Governors
    - Arthur George Murchison Fletcher, Governor (1936–1938)
- Turks and Caicos Islands, overseas territory
  - Commissioners
    - Geoffrey Peter St. Aubyn, Commissioner (1899–1901)
    - William Douglas Young, Commissioner (1901–1905)
    - Frederick Henry Watkins, Commissioner (1905–1914)
    - George Whitfield Smith, Commissioner (1914–1923)
    - Harold Ernest Phillips, Commissioner (1923–1932)
    - Hugh Houston Hutchings, Commissioner (1933–1934)
    - Frank Cecil Clarkson, Commissioner (1934–1936)
    - Hugh Charles Norwood Hill, Commissioner (1936–1940)
    - Edwin Porter Arrowsmith, Commissioner (1940–1946)
    - Cyril Eric Wool-Lewis, Commissioner (1947–1952)
    - Peter Bleackley, Commissioner (1952–1955)
    - Ernest Gordon Lewis, Commissioner (1955–1958)
    - Geoffrey Colin Guy, Commissioner (1958–1959)
  - Administrators
    - Geoffrey Colin Guy, administrator (1959–1965)
    - Robert Everard Wainwright, administrator (1965)
    - John Anthony Golding, administrator (1965–1967)
    - Robert Everard Wainwright, administrator (1967–1971)
    - Alexander Graham Mitchell, administrator (1971–1973)
  - Governors
    - Alexander Graham Mitchell, Governor (1973–1975)
    - Arthur Christopher Watson, Governor (1975–1978)
    - John Clifford Strong, Governor (1978–1982)
    - Christopher J. Turner, Governor (1982–1987)
    - Michael J. Bradley, Governor (1987–1993)
    - Martin Bourke, Governor (1993–1996)
    - John Kelly, Governor (1996–2000)
    - Mervyn Jones, Governor (2000–2002)
  - Chief ministers, Premiers
    - James Alexander George Smith McCartney, Chief minister (1976–1980)
    - Oswald Skippings, Chief minister (1980)
    - Norman Saunders, Chief minister (1980–1985)
    - Nathaniel Francis, Chief minister (1985–1986)
    - Oswald Skippings, Chief minister (1988–1991)
    - Washington Misick, Chief minister (1991–1995)
    - Derek Hugh Taylor, Chief minister (1995–2003)
- British Virgin Islands, overseas territory
  - Administrators, Governors
    - Nathaniel George Cookman, administrator (1896–1903)
    - Robert Stephen Earl, administrator (1903–1910)
    - Thomas Leslie Hardtman Jarvis, administrator (1910–1919)
    - Herbert Walter Peebles, administrator (1919–1922)
    - R. Hargrove, administrator (1922–1923)
    - Otho Lewis Hancock, administrator (1923–1926)
    - Frank Cecil Clarkson, administrator (1926–1934)
    - Donald Percy Wailling, administrator (1934–1946)
    - John Augustus Cockburn Cruikshank, administrator (1946–1954)
    - Henry Howard, administrator (1954–1956)
    - Geoffrey Pole Allesbrook, administrator (1956–1959)
    - Gerald Jackson Bryan, administrator (1959–1962)
    - Ian Thomson, administrator (1967–1971)
    - Walter Wilkinson Wallace, Governor (1974–1978)
    - James Alfred Davidson, Governor (1978–1982)
    - Martin Samuel Staveley, administrator (1962–1967)
    - Ian Thomson, administrator (1967–1971)
    - Derek George Cudmore, Governor (1971–1974)
    - Walter Wilkinson Wallace, Governor (1974–1978)
    - James Alfred Davidson, Governor (1978–1982)
    - David Robert Barwick, Governor (1982–1986)
    - Mark Herdman, Governor (1986–1991)
    - Peter Penfold, Governor (1991–1995)
    - David Mackilligin, Governor (1995–1998)
    - Frank Savage, Governor (1998–2002)
  - Chief ministers
    - Hamilton Lavity Stoutt, Chief minister (1967–1971)
    - Willard Wheatley, Chief minister (1971–1979)
    - Hamilton Lavity Stoutt, Chief minister (1979–1983)
    - Cyril Romney, Chief minister (1983–1986)
    - Hamilton Lavity Stoutt, Chief minister (1986–1995)
    - Ralph T. O'Neal, Chief minister (1995–2003)
- British Windward Islands
  - Governors
    - Ralph Champneys Williams, Governor (1906–1909)
    - James Hayes Sadler, Governor (1909–1914)
    - George Haddon-Smith, Governor (1914–1923)
    - Selwyn MacGregor Grier, Governor (1935–1937)

=== Mediterranean ===
- British Cyprus
  - High commissioners, Governors
    - Hamilton Goold-Adams, High commissioner (1911–1915)
    - Herbert Richmond Palmer, Governor (1933–1939)
- Akrotiri and Dhekelia, sovereign base areas
  - Administrators
    - Bill Rimmer, administrator (2000–2003)
- Gibraltar, Crown colony since 1830, then dependent territory since 1981
  - Governors
    - George White, Governor (1900–1905)
    - Frederick Forestier-Walker, Governor (1905–1910)
    - Archibald Hunter, Governor (1910–1913)
    - Herbert Miles, Governor (1913–1918)
    - Horace Smith-Dorrien, Governor (1918–1923)
    - Charles Monro, Governor (1923–1928)
    - Alexander Godley, Governor (1928–1933)
    - Charles Harington, Governor (1933–1938)
    - Edmund Ironside, Governor (1938–1939)
    - Clive Gerard Liddell, Governor (1939–1941)
    - John Vereker, Governor (1941–1942)
    - Noel Mason-Macfarlane, Governor (1942–1944)
    - Ralph Eastwood, Governor (1944–1947)
    - Kenneth Anderson, Governor (1947–1952)
    - Gordon MacMillan, Governor (1952–1955)
    - Harold Redman, Governor (1955–1958)
    - Charles Keightley, Governor (1958–1962)
    - Alfred Dudley Ward, Governor (1962–1965)
    - Gerald Lathbury, Governor (1965–1969)
    - Varyl Begg, Governor (1969–1973)
    - John Grandy, Governor (1973–1978)
    - William Jackson, Governor (1978–1982)
    - David Williams, Governor (1982–1985)
    - Peter Terry, Governor (1985–1989)
    - Derek Reffell, Governor (1989–1993)
    - John Chapple, Governor (1993–1995)
    - Hugo White, Governor (1995–1997)
    - Richard Luce, Governor (1997–2000)
    - Paul Speller, Acting Governor (2000)
    - David Durie, Governor (2000–2003)
  - Chief ministers
    - Robert Peliza, Chief minister (1969–1972)
    - Joshua Hassan, Chief minister (1972–1987)
- Malta Colony
  - Governors
    - Francis Grenfell, Governor (1899–1903)
    - Charles Clarke, Governor (1903–1907)
    - Henry Grant, Governor (1907–1909)
    - Leslie Rundle, Governor (1909–1915)
    - Paul Methuen, Governor (1915–1919)
    - Herbert Plumer, Governor (1919–1924)
    - Walter Congreve, Governor (1924–1927)
    - John Du Cane, Governor (1927–1931)
    - David Campbell, Governor (1931–1936)
    - Charles Bonham-Carter, Governor (1936–1940)
    - William Dobbie, Governor (1940–1942)
    - John Vereker, Governor (1942–1944)
    - Edmond Schreiber, Governor (1944–1946)
    - Francis Douglas, Governor (1946–1949)
    - Gerald Creasy, Governor (1949–1954)
    - Robert Laycock, Governor (1954–1959)
    - Guy Grantham, Governor (1959–1962)
    - Maurice Henry Dorman, Governor (1962–1964)

=== North America ===
- Newfoundland Colony
  - Governors
    - Henry Edward McCallum, Governor (1898–1901)
    - Charles Cavendish Boyle, Governor (1901–1904)
    - William MacGregor, Governor (1904–1907)
- Dominion of Newfoundland
  - Governors
    - William MacGregor, Governor (1907–1909)
    - Ralph Champneys Williams, Governor (1909–1913)
    - Walter Edward Davidson, Governor (1913–1917)
    - Charles Alexander Harris, Governor (1917–1922)
    - William Allardyce, Governor (1922–1928)
    - John Middleton, Governor (1928–1932)
    - David Murray Anderson, Governor (1933–1935)
    - Humphrey Walwyn, Governor (1936–1946)
    - Gordon Macdonald, Governor (1946–1949)
  - Prime Ministers
    - James Spearman Winter, Prime Minister (1897–1900)
    - Robert Bond, Prime Minister (1900–1909)
    - Edward Patrick Morris, Prime Minister (1909–1917)
    - John Chalker Crosbie, Prime Minister (1917–1918)
    - William F. Lloyd, Prime Minister (1918–1919)
    - Michael Patrick Cashin, Prime Minister (1919–1919)
    - Richard Squires, Prime Minister (1919–1923)
    - William Warren, Prime Minister (1923–1924)
    - Albert Hickman, Prime Minister (1924–1924)
    - Walter Stanley Monroe, Prime Minister (1924–1928)
    - Frederick C. Alderdice, Prime Minister (1928–1928)
    - Richard Squires, Prime Minister (1928–1932)
    - Frederick C. Alderdice, Prime Minister (1932–1934)

In 1934, the House of Assembly and Legislative Council voted to end responsible government. From 1934, up until confederation in 1949, Newfoundland was ruled directly by a British appointed Commission of Government.

=== Oceania ===
- Australia
  - Governors general
    - Thomas Denman, Governor general (1911–1914)
    - Ronald Munro-Ferguson, Governor general (1914–1920)
  - Prime ministers
    - Andrew Fisher, Prime minister (1910–1913)
    - Joseph Cook, Prime minister (1913–1914)
    - Andrew Fisher, Prime minister (1914–1915)
- Bermuda, overseas territory
  - Governors
    - George Digby Barker, Governor (1896–1901)
    - Henry LeGuay Geary, Governor (1902–1904)
    - Robert M. Steward, Governor (1904–1907)
    - Josceline Wodehouse, Governor (1907–1908)
    - Walter Kitchener, Governor (1908–1912)
    - George Bullock, Governor (1912–1917)
    - James Willcocks, Governor (1917–1922)
    - J. J. Asser, Governor (1922–1927)
    - Louis Bols, Governor (1927–1931)
    - Thomas Cubitt, Governor (1931–1936)
    - Reginald Hildyard, Governor (1936–1939)
    - Denis Bernard, Governor (1939–1941)
    - Edward Knollys, Governor (1941–1943)
    - David Cecil, Governor (1943–1945)
    - William Addis, Acting Governor (1945–1946)
    - Ralph Leatham, Governor (1946–1949)
    - Alexander Hood, Governor (1949–1955)
    - John Woodall, Governor (1955–1959)
    - Julian Gascoigne, Governor (1959–1964)
    - Roland Robinson, Governor (1964–1972)
    - Richard Sharples, Governor (1972–1973)
    - Edwin Leather, Governor (1973–1977)
    - Peter Lloyd, Acting Governor (1977)
    - Peter Ramsbotham, Governor (1977–1980)
    - Peter Lloyd, Acting Governor (1981)
    - Richard Posnett, Governor (1981–1983)
    - Mark Herdman, Acting Governor (1983)
    - John Morrison, Governor (1983–1988)
    - Desmond Langley, Governor (1988–1992)
    - David Waddington, Governor (1992–1997)
    - Thorold Masefield, Governor (1997–2001)
  - Premiers
    - Henry Tucker, Government leader (1968–1971)
    - Edward Richards, Government leader (1971–1973), Premier (1973–1975)
    - John Henry Sharpe, Premier (1975–1977)
    - David Gibbons, Premier (1977–1982)
    - John Swan, Premier (1982–1995)
    - David Saul, Premier (1995–1997)
    - Pamela Gordon, Premier (1997–1998)
    - Jennifer M. Smith, Premier (1998–2003)
- Gilbert and Ellice Islands
  - Resident commissioners
    - Edward Carlyon Eliot, Resident commissioner
    - Valdemar Jens Andersen, Resident commissioner (1962–1970)
    - John Osbaldiston Field, Resident commissioner (1970–1972), the Governor (1972–1973)
- Gilbert Islands
  - Governors
    - John Hilary Smith, Governor (1973–1978)
    - Reginald James Wallace, Governor (1978–1979)
  - Chief ministers
    - Naboua Ratieta, Chief minister (1974–1978)
    - Ieremia Tabai, Chief minister (1978–1979)
- Ellice Islands
  - Commissioners
    - Thomas H. Laying, Commissioner (1975–1978)
  - Chief ministers
    - Toaripi Lauti, Chief minister (1975–1978)
- Falkland Islands
  - Governors
    - William Grey-Wilson, Governor (1897–1904)
    - William Lamond Allardyce, Governor (1904–1915)
    - William Douglas Young, Governor (1915–1920)
    - John Middleton, Governor (1920–1927)
    - Arnold Weinholt Hodson, Governor (1927–1931)
    - James O'Grady, Governor (1931–1934)
    - Herbert Henniker-Heaton, Governor (1935–1941)
    - Allan Wolsey Cardinall, Governor (1941–1946)
    - Geoffrey Miles Clifford, Governor (1946–1954)
    - Oswald Raynor Arthur, Governor (1954–1957)
    - Edwin Porter Arrowsmith, Governor (1957–1964)
    - Cosmo Dugal Patrick Thomas Haskar, Governor (1964–1970)
    - Ernest Gordon Lewis, Governor (1971–1975)
    - Neville Arthur Irwin French, Governor (1975–1977)
    - James Roland Walter Parker, Governor (1977–1980)
    - Rex Hunt, Governor (1980–1982)
    - Occupation by Argentina
    - Jeremy Moore, Commander (1982)
    - Rex Hunt, Commissioner (1982–1985)
    - Gordon Wesley Jewkes, Governor (1985–1988)
    - William Hugh Fullerton, Governor (1988–1992)
    - David Everard Tatham, Governor (1992–1996)
    - Richard Ralph, Governor (1996–1999)
    - Donald Lamont, Governor (1999–2002)
- Colony of Fiji
  - Governors
    - Ernest Sweet-Escott, Governor (1912–1918)
- British Indian Ocean Territory (Chagos Archipelago), overseas territory
  - Commissioners
    - Hugh Norman-Walker, Commissioner (1967–1969)
- Pitcairn Islands, overseas territory
  - Governors
    - Arthur Galsworthy, Governor (1970–1973)
    - David Aubrey Scott, Governor (1973–1975)
    - Harold Smedley, Governor (1976–1980)
    - Richard Stratton, Governor (1980–1984)
    - Terence Daniel O'Leary, Governor (1984–1987)
    - Robin Byatt, Governor (1987–1990)
    - David Moss, Governor (1990–1994)
    - Robert John Alston, Governor (1994–1998)
    - Martin Williams, Governor (1998–2001)
  - Magistrates
    - James Russell McCoy, President of the Council (1897–1904)
    - William Alfred Young, President of the Council (1904)
    - James Russell McCoy, Chief magistrate (1904–1906)
    - Arthur Herbert Young, Chief magistrate (1907)
    - William Alfred Young, Chief magistrate (1908)
    - Matthew Edmond McCoy, Chief magistrate (1909)
    - Gerard Bromley Robert Christian, Chief magistrate (1910–1919)
    - Charles Richard Parkin Christian, Chief magistrate (1920)
    - Frederick Martin Christian, Chief magistrate (1921)
    - Charles Richard Parkin Christian, Chief magistrate (1922)
    - Edgar Allen Christian, Chief magistrate (1923–1924)
    - Charles Richard Parkin Christian, Chief magistrate (1925)
    - Edgar Allen Christian, Chief magistrate (1926–1929)
    - Arthur Herbert Young, Chief magistrate (1930–1931)
    - Edgar Allen Christian, Chief magistrate (1932)
    - Charles Richard Parkin Christian, Chief magistrate (1933–1934)
    - Edgar Allen Christian, Chief magistrate (1935–1939)
    - Andrew Clarence David Young, Chief magistrate (1940)
    - Frederick Martin Christian, Chief magistrate (1941)
    - Charles Richard Parkin Christian, Chief magistrate (1942)
    - Frederick Martin Christian, Chief magistrate (1943)
    - Charles Richard Parkin Christian, Chief magistrate (1944)
    - Norris Henry Young, Chief magistrate (1945–1948)
    - Charles Richard Parkin Christian, Chief magistrate (1949)
    - Warren Clive Christian, Chief magistrate (1950–1951)
    - John Lorenzo Christian, Chief magistrate (1952–1954)
    - Charles Richard Parkin Christian, Chief magistrate (1955–1957)
    - Warren Clive Christian, Chief magistrate (1958–1960)
    - John Lorenzo Christian, Chief magistrate (1961–1966)
    - Pervis Ferris Young, Chief magistrate (1967–1975)
    - Ivan Christian, Chief magistrate (1975–1984)
    - Brian Young, Chief magistrate (1984–1991)
    - Jay Warren, Chief magistrate (1991–1999)
    - Steve Christian, Mayor (1999–2004)
- Saint Helena and Dependencies, overseas territory
  - Governors
    - Dermod Murphy, Governor (1968–1971)
    - Thomas Oates, Governor (1971–1976)
    - Geoffrey Colin Guy, Governor (1976–1981)
    - John Dudley Massingham, Governor (1981–1984)
    - David Hollamby, Governor (1999–2004)
  - Ascension, dependency of Saint Helena
    - Administrators
      - M. E. Wainwright, administrator (1964–1966)
      - Anthony G.A. Beyts, administrator (1966–1967)
      - H. W. D. McDonald, administrator (1968–1973)
      - Geoffrey Colin Guy, administrator (1973–1976)
      - G. McDonald, administrator (1976–1977)
      - G. B. Kendal, administrator (1977)
      - Simon Gillett, administrator (1977–1979)
      - P. Duncan, administrator (1979–1980)
      - Bernard Edward Pauncefort, administrator (1980–1982)
      - I. G. Thow, administrator (1982–1984)
      - Michael T. S. Blick, administrator (1984–1989)
      - J. J. Beale, administrator (1989 –1991)
      - Brian Norman Connelly, administrator (1991–1995)
      - Roger C. Huxley, administrator (1995–1999)
      - Geoffrey Fairhurst, administrator (1999–2002)
  - Tristan da Cunha, dependency of Saint Helena
    - Administrators

=== South America ===
- British Guiana
  - Governors
    - Walter Egerton, Governor (1912–1917)
    - Edward Brandis Denham, Governor (1930–1935)
    - Geoffry Northcote, Governor (1935–1937)
    - Wilfrid Edward Francis Jackson, Governor (1937–1941)

== United States territories ==
=== Central America ===
List of governors of the Panama Canal Zone

  - Military Governors (1904–1914)
    - Major general George Whitefield Davis, Military governor (1904–1905)
    - Charles Edward Magoon, Military governor (1905–1906)
    - Richard Reid Rogers, Military governor (1906–1907)
    - Joseph Clay Stiles Blackburn, Military governor (1907–1909)
    - Maurice Thatcher, Military governor (1910–1913)
    - Richard Lee Metcalfe, Military governor (1913–1914)
  - Military and Civil Governors (1914–1924)
    - George Washington Goethals, 1st governor (1914–1917)
    - Chester Harding (governor), 2nd governor (1917–1921)
    - Jay Johnson Morrow, 3rd governor (1921–1924)
  - Civil Governors (1924–1979)
    - Brigadier general Meriwether Lewis Walker, 4th governor (1924–1928)
    - Harry Burgess, 5th governor (1928–1932)
    - Major general Julian Larcombe Schley, 6th governor (1932–1936)
    - Clarence S. Ridley, 7th governor (1936–1940)
    - Glen Edgar Edgerton, 8th governor (1940–1944)
    - Major general Joseph Cowles Mehaffey, 9th governor (1944–1948)
    - Brigadier general Francis K. Newcomer, 10th governor (1948–1952)
    - Major general John States Seybold, 11th governor (1952–1956)
    - William Everett Potter, 12th governor (1956–1960)
    - William Arnold Carter, 13th governor (1960–1962)
    - Robert John Fleming, 14th governor (1962–1967)
    - Walter Philip Leber, 15th governor (1967–1971)
    - David Stuart Parker, 16th governor (1971–1975)
    - Major general Harold Parfitt, 17th governor (1975–1979)
  - Administrators of the Panama Canal Commission
    - Dennis P. McAuliffe, 1st Administrator of the Panama Canal Commission (1979–1989)
    - Gilberto Guardia Fabrega, 2nd Administrator of the Panama Canal Commission (1989–1996)
    - Alberto Aleman Zubieta, 3rd Administrator of the Panama Canal Commission (1996–2012)

=== Caribbean Sea ===
List of colonial governors of Cuba

  - American Suzerainty
    - Major general Leonard Wood, Military Governor of Cuba (1899–1902)
  - Republic of Cuba (1902–1959)
  - American Occupation (1906–1909)
    - William Howard Taft, 1st Provisional Governor of Cuba (1906); 27th President of the United States (1909–1913)
    - Charles Edward Magoon, 2ndProvisional Governor of Cuba (1906–1920)

United States Virgin Islands, unincorporated territory Purchased from Denmark by the United States (22 Dec 1916).

  - Governors U.S. sovereignty, end of Danish administration (31 Mar 1917)
  - 31 Mar 1917–30 Jan 1931 Administered by U.S. Navy.
    - Captain Edwin Taylor Pollock, acting Governor (31 Mar 1917 – 8 Apr 1917)
    - James Harrison Oliver, Governor (1917–1919)
    - Joseph Wallace Oman, Governor (8 Apr 1919 – 26 Apr 1921)
    - Sumner Ely Wetmore Kittelle, Governor (1921–1922)
    - Henry Hughes Hough, Governor (16 Sep 1922 – 3 Dec 1923)
    - Philip Williams, Governor (1923–1925)
    - Martin Edward Trench, Governor (12 Sep 1925 – 6 Jan 1927)
    - Waldo A. Evans, Governor (1927–1931) Administered by U.S. Department of Interior (30 Jan 1931 – 4 Jan 1971)
    - Paul Martin Pearson, Governor (18 Mar 1931 – 23 Jul 1935)
    - Robert Herrick, acting for Pearson (23 Jul 1935 – 21 Aug 1935)
    - Lawrence William Cramer, Governor (1935–1940)
    - Robert Morss Lovett, Acting Governor (14 Dec 1940 – 3 Feb 1941)
    - Charles Harwood, Governor (1941–1945) Water Island is purchased by the U.S (19 Jun 1944).
    - William H. Hastie, Governor (17 May 1946 – 30 Nov 1949)
    - Morris Fidanque de Castro, acting Governor (30 Nov 1949 – 24 Mar 1950), Governor (24 Mar 1950 – 9 April 1954)
    - Archibald "Archie" A. Alexander, Governor (9 Apr 1954 – 31 Aug 1955)
    - Charles Kenneth Claunch, acting Governor (31 Aug 1955 – 17 October 1955)
    - Walter Arthur Gordon, Governor (17 Oct 1955 – 25 Sep 1958)
    - John David Merwin, Governor (1958–1961)
    - Ralph Moses Paiewonsky, Governor (5 Apr 1961 – 12 Feb 1969)
    - Cyril King, Acting Governor (1969)
    - Melvin H. Evans, Governor (1969–1975)
    - Cyril King, Governor (1975–1978)
    - Juan Francisco Luis, Governor (1978–1987)
    - Alexander A. Farrelly, Governor (1987–1995)
    - Roy L. Schneider, Governor (1995–1999)
    - Charles Wesley Turnbull, Governor (1999–2007)

=== Pacific Ocean ===
United States territorial acquisitions

  - Presidents

American Samoa, unincorporated territory

  - Governors
    - Benjamin Franklin Tilley, Commandant (1900–1901)
    - Uriel Sebree, Commandant (1901–1902)
    - Henry Minett, Acting Commandant (1902–1903)
    - Edmund Beardsley Underwood, Commandant, Governor (1903–1905)
    - Charles Brainard Taylor Moore, Governor (1905–1908)
    - John Frederick Parker, Governor (1908–1910)
    - William Michael Crose, Governor (1910–1913)
    - Nathan Post, Acting Governor (1913)
    - Clark Daniel Stearns, Governor (1913–1914)
    - Nathan Post, Acting Governor (1914)
    - Charles Armijo Woodruff, Acting Governor (1914–1915)
    - John Martin Poyer, Governor (1915–1919)
    - Warren Terhune, Governor (1919–1920)
    - Waldo A. Evans, Governor (1920–1922)
    - Edwin Taylor Pollock, Governor (1922–1923)
    - Edward Stanley Kellogg, Governor (1923–1925)
    - Henry Francis Bryan, Governor (1925–1927)
    - Stephen Victor Graham, Governor (1927–1929)
    - Gatewood Lincoln, Governor (1929–1931)
    - James Sutherland Spore, Acting Governor (1931)
    - Arthur Emerson, Acting Governor (1931–1931)
    - Gatewood Lincoln, Governor (1931–1932)
    - George Landenberger, Governor (1932–1934)
    - Thomas C. Latimore, Acting Governor (1934)
    - Otto Dowling, Governor (1934–1936)
    - Thomas Benjamin Fitzpatrick, Acting Governor (1936)
    - MacGillivray Milne, Governor (1936–1938)
    - Edward Hanson, Governor (1938–1940)
    - Jesse Wallace, Acting Governor (1940)
    - Laurence Wild, Governor (1940–1942)
    - Henry Louis Larsen, Military Governor (1942)
    - John Gould Moyer, Governor (1942–1944)
    - Allen Hobbs, Governor (1944–1945)
    - Ralph Hungerford, Governor (1945)
    - Samuel Canan, Acting Governor (1945)
    - Harold Houser, Governor (1945–1947)
    - Vernon Huber, Governor (1947–1949)
    - Thomas Darden, Governor (1949–1951)
    - Phelps Phelps, Governor (1951–1952)
    - John C. Elliott, Governor (1952)
    - James Arthur Ewing, Governor (1952–1953)
    - Lawrence M. Judd, Governor (1953)
    - Richard Barrett Lowe, Governor (1953–1956)
    - Peter Tali Coleman, Governor (1956–1961)
    - H. Rex Lee, Governor (1961–1967)
    - Owen Aspinall, Governor (1967–1969)
    - John Morse Haydon, Governor (1969–1974)
    - Frank Mockler, Acting Governor (1974–1975)
    - Earl B. Ruth, Governor (1975–1976)
    - Frank Barnett, Governor (1976–1977)
    - H. Rex Lee, Governor (1977–1978)
    - Peter Tali Coleman, Governor (1978–1985)
    - A. P. Lutali, Governor (1985–1989)
    - Peter Tali Coleman, Governor (1989–1993)
    - A. P. Lutali, Governor (1993–1997)
    - Tauese Sunia, Governor (1997–2003)

- Territory of Hawaii Annexed by the U.S. in 1898. Organized as territory (1900—1959)
  - Territorial Governors
    - Sanford B. Dole]], Governor (1900–1903)
    - George R. Carter]], Governor (1903–1907)
    - Walter F. Frear]], Governor (1907–1913)
    - Lucius E. Pinkham]], Governor (1913–1918)
    - Charles J. McCarthy]], Governor (1918–1921)
    - Wallace Rider Farrington]], Governor (1921–1929)
    - Lawrence M. Judd]], Governor (1929–1934)
    - Joseph Poindexter]], Governor (1934–1942)
    - Walter Short]], Lieutenant General (1941)
    - Delos Carleton Emmons]], Lieutenant General (1941–1943)
    - Robert C. Richardson Jr.]], Lieutenant General (1943–1944)
    - Ingram Stainback]], Governor (1942*–1951)
    - Oren E. Long]], Governor (1951–1953)
    - Samuel Wilder King]], Governor (1953–1957)
    - William F. Quinn]], Governor (1957–1959)
- Trust Territory of the Pacific Islands was a United Nations trust territory in Micronesia administered by the United States from 1947 to 1994.
  - High commissioners
    - Edward Elliott Johnston, High commissioner (1969–1976)
    - Adrian P. Winkel, High commissioner (1977–1981)
    - Janet J. McCoy, High commissioner (1981–1987)
- Northern Mariana Islands, Insular area since 24 March 1976. Formerly part of the Trust Territory of the Pacific Islands (1947–1974).
  - Governors
    - Carlos S. Camacho, Governor (1978–1982)
    - Pedro Tenorio, Governor (1982–1990)
    - Guerrero, Governor (1990–1994)
    - Froilan Tenorio, Governor (1994–1998)
    - Pedro Tenorio, Governor (1998–2002)

=== United States occupational forces ===
- United States occupation of Veracruz (21 April 1914 – 23 November 1914)

    - Rear Admiral (USN) Frank Friday Fletcher, U.S. Fleet commander (21 April 1914 – 30 April 1914)
    - Brigadier General (USA) Frederick Funston, commander (30 April 1914 – 23 November 1914)

- Allied-occupied Austria (27 April 1945 – 27 July 1955)

  - High commissioners of the American Zone (Salzburg and Upper Austria)
    - General (USA) Mark W. Clark (5 July 1945 – 16 May 1947)
    - Lieutenant General (USA) Geoffrey Keyes (17 May 1947 – 19 September 1950) Beginning of Marshall Plan.
    - Walter J. Donnelly (20 September 1950 – 17 July 1952)
    - Llewellyn Thompson (17 July 1952 – 27 July 1955)

== Other ==
- New Hebrides, condominium of Britain and France
  - British resident commissioners
    - Colin Allan, Resident commissioner (1966–1973)
    - John Stuart Champion, Resident commissioner (1975–1978)
    - Andrew Stuart, Resident commissioner (1978–1980)
  - French resident commissioners
    - Robert Jules Amédée Langlois, Resident commissioner (1969–1974)
    - Robert Gauger, Resident commissioner (1974–1978)
    - Bernard Pottier, Resident commissioner (1978)
    - Jean-Jacques Robert, Resident commissioner (1978–1980)
  - Chief ministers
    - George Kalsakau, Chief minister (1977–1978)
    - Gérard Leymang, Chief minister (1978–1979)
    - Walter Lini, Chief minister (1979–1980)

== See also ==
- List of princely states of British India (alphabetical)
- List of princely states of British India (by region)
- Antarctic Treaty System
- Chief minister
- List of state leaders in the 20th century (1901–1950)
- List of state leaders in the 20th century (1951–2000)
- List of state leaders in 20th-century British South Asia
