= List of colonial governors of French Guinea =

This is a list of colonial governors of French Guinea, from 1891 to 1958.

== List of Colonial Heads of Guinea ==
(Dates in italics indicated de facto continuation of office)

Tenure	Incumbent	Notes
French Suzerainty
French Guinea
22 December 1891 to 16 June 1895	Noël Ballay, Governor
Incorporated into French West Africa
16 June 1895 to 2 November 1900	Noël Ballay, Governor
2 November 1900 to 28 September 1904	Paul Cousturier, Governor
28 September 1904 to 15 October 1904	Antoine Marie Auguste Frezouls, acting Governor
28 September 1904 to 27 March 1906	Antoine Marie Auguste Frezouls, Governor
27 March 1906 to 16 May 1907	Jules Louis Richard, acting Governor
16 May 1907 to 25 July 1907	Joost van Vollenhoven, acting Governor
26 July 1907 to 18 February 1908	Georges Poulet, acting Governor	1st Term
18 February 1908 to 4 July 1910	Victor Liotard, Governor
4 July 1910 to November 1910	Georges Poulet, acting Governor	2nd Term
November 1910 to 9 May 1912	Camille Guy, Governor
9 May 1912 to 7 March 1913	Jean Louis Georges Poiret, acting Governor	1st Term
7 March 1913 to 23 October 1915	Jean Jules Émile Peuvergne, Governor
23 October 1915 to 12 October 1916	Jean Louis Georges Poiret, acting Governor
12 October 1916 to 21 July 1929	Jean Louis Georges Poiret, Governor
21 July 1929 to 1931	Louis François Antonin, acting Governor
1931 to 1 January 1932	Robert de Guise, Governor
1 January 1932 to 7 March 1936	Joseph Zébédée Olivier Vadier, Governor
7 March 1936 to 12 February 1940	Louis Placide Blacher, Governor
12 February 1940 to August 1942	Antoine Félix Giacobbi, Governor
August 1942 to 25 March 1944	Horace Valentin Crocicchia, Governor
25 March 1944 to 30 April 1946	Jacques Fourneau, acting Governor
30 April 1946 to January 1948	Édouard Louis Terrac, acting Governor
January 1948 to 9 February 1951	Roland Pré, Governor
9 February 1951 to April 1953	Paul Henri Siriex, Governor
April 1953 to 2 December 1953	Jean Paul Parisot, acting Governor
2 December 1953 to 23 June 1955	Jean Paul Parisot, Governor
23 June 1955 to 3 June 1956	Charles-Henri Bonfils, Governor
3 June 1956 to 29 January 1958	Jean Ramadier, Governor
29 January 1958 to 2 October 1958	Jean Mauberna, acting Governor
2 October 1958	Independent as Republic of Guinea

For continuation after independence, see: Presidents of Guinea

== See also ==
- Guinea
  - Heads of State of Guinea
  - Heads of Government of Guinea
- Lists of incumbents
