= Horace Valentin Crocicchia =

French colonial administrator

Horace Valentin Crocicchia (6 November 1888 – 1976) was a colonial administrator in various colonies of the French Colonial Empire.

== Titles Held ==
Government offices
Preceded by Louis Bressolles (Acting)	Governor of Côte d'Ivoire (Acting); 27 January 1939–5 March 1940	Succeeded by Incumbent
Preceded by Incumbent (Acting)	Governor of Côte d'Ivoire; 5 March 1940–1 January 1941	Succeeded by Hubert Jules Deschamps
Preceded by Léon Solomiac	Governor of French India; 1936–1938	Succeeded by Louis Alexis Étienne Bonvin
Preceded by Antoine Félix Giacobbi	Governor of Guinea (Acting); August 1942–25 March 1944	Succeeded by Jacques Georges Fourneau (Acting)

== See also ==
- List of colonial governors in 1942
- List of colonial governors in 1943
- List of colonial governors in 1944
- Colonial heads of Guinea
- Colonial heads of Côte d'Ivoire
