= Gabriel Louis Angoulvant =

French colonial administrator

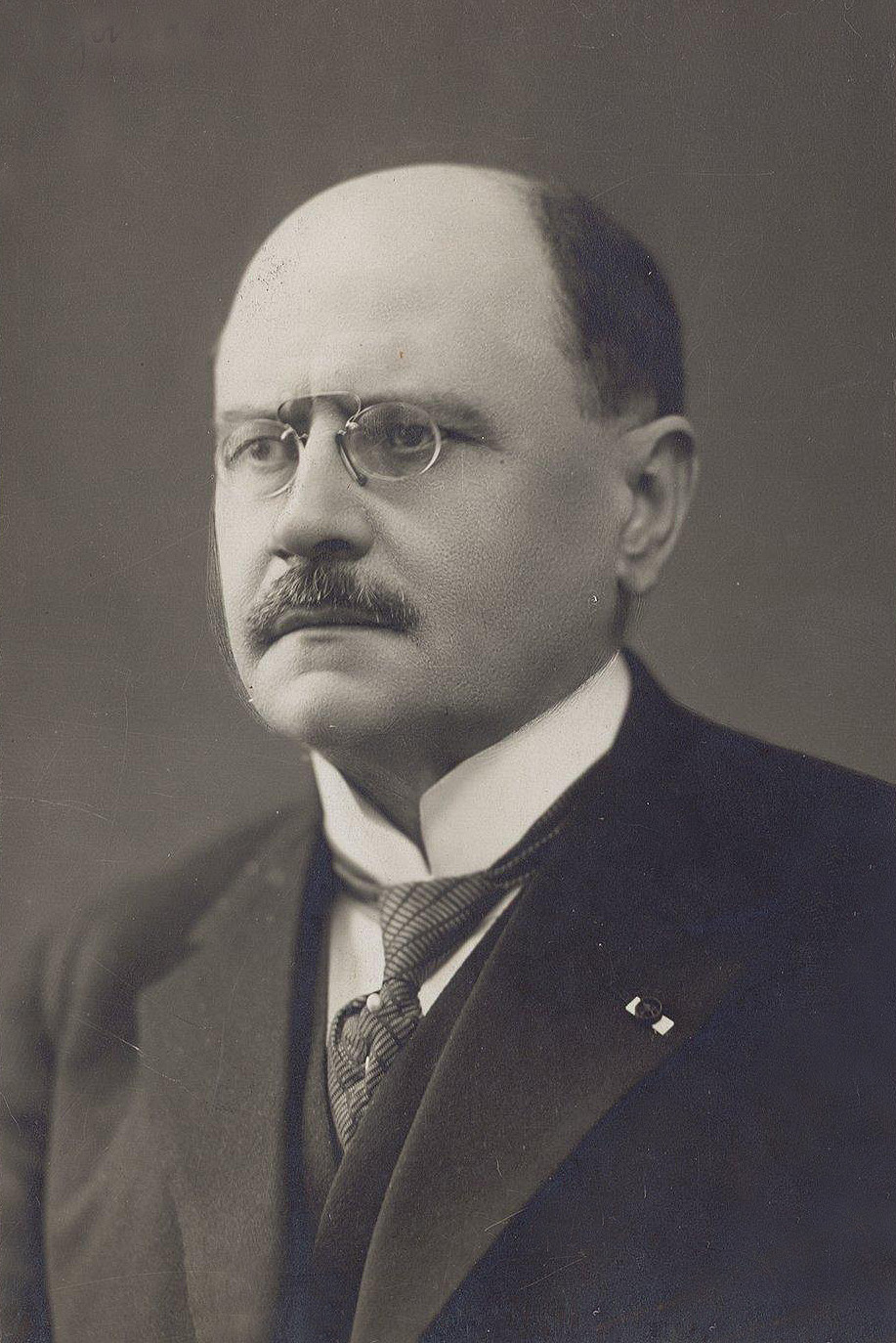
Gabriel Louis Angoulvant

Gabriel Louis Angoulvant (born 1872 in Longjumeau, France – died 1932 in Paris) was a colonial administrator in the second French colonial empire.

He was appointed governor of French Ivory Coast in 1908. He had little prior experience in Africa and believed that the development of Ivory Coast could proceed only after the forceful conquest, or so-called pacification, of the colony. He thus embarked on a vigorous campaign, sending military expeditions into the hinterland to quell resistance. As a result of these expeditions, local rulers were compelled to obey existing antislavery laws, supply porters and food to the French forces, and ensure the protection of French trade and personnel. In return, the French agreed to leave local customs intact and specifically promised not to intervene in the selection of rulers. But the French often disregarded their side of the agreement, deporting or interning rulers regarded as instigators of revolt. They also regrouped villages and established a uniform administration throughout most of the colony. Finally, they replaced the coutume with an allowance based on performance.

He was elected to the French parliament, representing the territories of French India in 1920.

He contributed to the organization of the Paris Colonial Exposition of 1931.

He served as one of the seven members of the Committee of Experts on Slavery (CES) of the League of Nations in 1932-1933.

Angoulvant published a number of books regarding the French colonial empire, including "La Pacification de la Côte d'Ivoire" in 1916.

== Titles ==
Government offices
| Preceded by Alfred Albert Martineau | Governor of French Somaliland (Acting); 13 April 1900 – 6 December 1900 | Succeeded by Adrien Jules Jean Bonhoure |
| Preceded by Paul Jean François Cousturier | Governor of Saint-Pierre and Miquelon; 9 June 1905 – 12 May 1906 | Succeeded by Raphaël Antonetti (Acting) |
| Preceded by Joseph Pascal François | Governor of French India; October 1906–3 December 1907 | Succeeded by Adrien Jules Jean Bonhoure |
| Preceded by Albert Anatole Nebout | Governor of the Ivory Coast (1st Time); 25 April 1908 – 28 April 1909 | Succeeded by Pierre Brun (acting for Angoulvant) |
| Preceded by Pierre Brun (acting for Angoulvant) | Governor of the Ivory Coast (2nd Time); August 1909–12 May 1911 | Succeeded by Casimir Guyon (acting for Angoulvant) |
| Preceded by Casimir Guyon (acting for Angoulvant) | Governor of the Ivory Coast (3rd Time); 9 March 1912 – 22 May 1913 | Succeeded by Casimir Guyon (acting for Angoulvant) |
| Preceded by Gustave Julien (acting for Angoulvant) | Governor of the Ivory Coast (4th Time); 4 September 1914 –16 June 1916 | Succeeded by Maurice-Pierre Lapalud (acting for Angoulvant) |
| Preceded by Maurice-Pierre Lapalud (acting for Angoulvant) | Governor of the Ivory Coast (5th Time); 1 December 1916 –27 December 1916 | Succeeded by Maurice-Pierre Lapalud (acting) |
| Preceded by Frédéric Estèbe (Acting for Martial Henri Merlin) | Governor-General of French Equatorial Africa; 15 May 1917 – 16 May 1920 | Succeeded by Maurice Pierre Lapalud (Acting) |
| Preceded by Joost van Vollenhoven | Governor of Sénégal; 22 January 1918 – 30 July 1919 | Succeeded by Charles Désiré Auguste Brunet |

== See also ==
- Colonial heads of Côte d'Ivoire
- Colonial heads of French Equatorial Africa
- Colonial heads of Djibouti (French Somaliland)
- List of colonial governors in 1900
