= Ernest Noirot =

French comic actor and colonial administrator

Jean-Baptiste Ernest Noirot
- Born: 18 August 1851; Bourbonne-les-Bains
- Died: 28 December 1913 (aged 62); Bourbonne-les-Bains
- Occupations: Comic actor, Photographer, Colonial administrator
- Known for: Director of Indigenous Affairs of French Guinea

Jean-Baptiste Ernest Noirot (pronounced [ɛʁnɛst nwaʁo]; 18 August 1851 – 28 December 1913) was a French comic actor, photographer, explorer and colonial administrator in Senegal and French Guinea in West Africa. He became involved in scandal and was suspended in 1905 when two of his protégés were accused of extortion and other abuses of power, but later he was reinstated.

== Early years ==
Jean-Baptiste Ernest Noirot was born at Bourbonne-les-Bains in Haute Marne on 18 August 1851, son of a timber merchant. He served as a volunteer in the Franco-Prussian War of 1870–71. For a while he worked at the Folies Bergère and the Folies Dramatiques in Paris as a comic actor. He seems to have worked at the Folies Bergère until 1880. His personnel file says he was also a publicist.

Noirot was the artist and photographer on Dr. Jean-Marie Bayol's 1881–1882 expedition to explore the southern rivers of Senegal and Guinea. The expedition aimed to promote trade with the French as an alternative to existing arrangements with British traders in Freetown, Sierra Leone. He found a still-independent theocratic state in the Imamate of Futa Jallon. He made many landscapes, and several portrait photographs of local people and chiefs. The Almamis of Futa Jallon, Ibrahima and Amadou, sent an embassy of five notables that accompanied Noirot and Bayol on their return journey to France in January 1882. They spent a month in Bordeaux, Paris and Marseilles, where they were greatly impressed by what they saw.

Noirot's 1882 book À travers le Fouta Djallon et le Bambouc (Soudan Occidental). Souvenirs de Voyage records his experiences. The Société de Géographie de Marseille gave a very positive review of the book, written by an artist with humor and understanding, of his stay among the hospitable Fulani and Malinke people of the region. It may be due to this work that he was offered a position in the commission for the Exposition Coloniale Française held at Anvers in 1885–86.

== Administrator ==
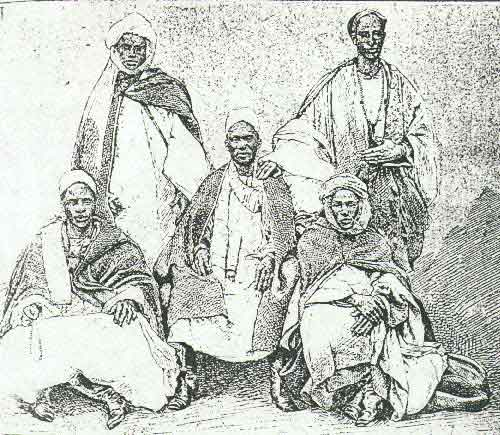
1882 Futa Jallon embassy to France, drawn by Noirot

On 1 April 1886 Noirot was appointed a colonial administrator. He was assigned to Senegal, where he was briefly commander of the Dagana circle (9 June – 12 July 1886), then Saldé (12 July 1886 – 16 February 1887) and then again Dagana (16 February 1887 – 1889) He received excellent reports for his performance. In 1887 he was with the French expedition that crushed Futa Jallon. In 1889 he represented Senegal at the Universal Exposition in Paris on the Centennial of the French Revolution. There he arranged the display of a Senegalese Village.

On returning from France, Noirot was administrator of the Sine-Saloum circle in Senegal from March 1890 to 1896. The explorer Félix Dubois admired his approach to administering Sine-Saloum, and particularly his schools, providing elementary French education, introducing new crops (maize, vegetables and European berries), introducing the students and their parents to the use of the plow. Dubois described him as a modest secular missionary. In June 1897 Ernest Noirot was appointed administrator of the newly acquired region of Fouta Djallon in what is now Guinea, where he dedicated himself to eliminating the institution of slavery. Noirot announced rules that the chiefs must follow in treatment of slaves, and wrote many memorandums on the subject, but in practice the chiefs ignored him.

For nearly twenty years Noirot's interpreter was Boubou Penda. Boubou was hired as a servant some time before 1889. He had originally been a slave. The two men developed a close relationship. They visited France together in 1897 and again in 1900. By the late 1890s Boubou had amassed wealth in gold, livestock and slaves that far exceeded what could be explained by his salary. In December 1898 Boubou was twice assaulted by some African soldiers. Noirot intervened the second time, and was slightly hurt in the scuffle. This involvement of a French official in a "native" squabble caused a stir, and an investigation was launched. The next year another official warned Noirot that he had been told Boubou had demanded some goats from a village on the basis of a letter he claimed was written by Noirot. Noirot refused to recognize that anything was wrong.

Another player in the Futa Jallon story was a clerk named Hubert, a nephew of the explorer Louis Gustave Binger, who became a protégé of Noirot. When Noirot was appointed Director of Native Affairs in 1901, Hubert became commandant of Futa Jallon. Hubert adopted an extravagant lifestyle, travelling in great pomp and style with an elaborate entourage, riding a white horse, preceded by praise singers and followed by several of his many mistresses carried in hammocks. In 1903 Noirot and Boubou both obtained land concessions near Conakry. Despite continued and growing abuses by Boubou and Hubert, Noirot provided protection to both men. In 1905 there were renewed allegations of extortion and abuse of power. The new Governor, Antoine Marie Auguste Frézouls, was trying to clean up the administration and launched an investigation. Frézouls suspended Hubert and Noirot and arrested Boubou Penda. Noirot had to return to France. Press reports in 1906 were hostile to the governor. Frézouls was also removed early in 1906. Eventually the inquiry was abandoned.

Noirot was reinstated in 1908, and was administrator of Upper Gambia from 1908 to 1909. From March 1909 to March 1910 he was delegate of the Government of Senegal at Dakar. Noirot's health began to deteriorate, and he returned to France on leave for a year. On 1 June 1911 he was appointed Governor of Ubangi-Shari, but was not able to take up this post. He retired on 18 August 1911. Noirot was elected mayor of Bourbonne-les-Bains, where he died on 28 December 1913.

== Legacy ==
Noirot was single throughout his life. He had many faults, and could be charming or abrasive. He had huge energy and imagination. He initiated projects to build railways, mechanize farming, educate farmers, educate women, provide rural postal service and establish experimental gardens. He was one of the first administrators to try to understand the local society, within the limitations of the colonial perspective. He recorded his journeys in drawings and paintings, and wrote down the music that he heard. A bridge at Kaolack, Senegal bears his name.

== Bibliography ==
- Noirot, Ernest (1882). A travers le Fouta-Diallon et le Bambouc (Soudan occidental). Paris: Librairie Marpon et Flammarion. p. 248.
- Noirot, Ernest. Papiers Ernest Noiro, 1881–1909.
- Noirot, Ernest; Boilat, P.-David (2007). L'explorateur, le photographe et la missionnaire: les carnets de Gwenaëlle Trolez. Magellan et Cie. ISBN 978-2-35074-086-7.
