= Adrien Jules Jean Bonhoure =

French colonial administrator

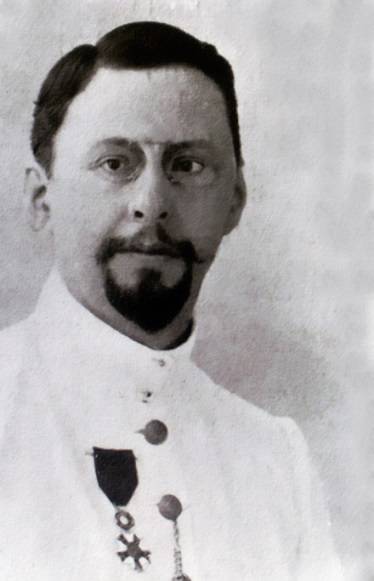
- Adrien Bonhoure
- Born: August 26, 1860; Shanghai, China
- Died: 1929 (aged 68–69)

Adrien Jules Jean Bonhoure (1860 - 1929) was a French governor of colonies of the French colonial empire, including Côte d'Ivoire, French Somaliland, Réunion, French India and French Polynesia. He was born in 1860 and died in 1929.

== Biography ==
Adrien Bonhoure was born to a father from the Gard region who was then serving as an evangelical missionary in China.

Admitted to the Court of Appeal of Paris on November 7, 1882, he became deputy chief of staff to the President of the Chamber of Deputies (Third French Republic) in April 1885, then chief of staff from November 1885 to April 1889, and finally chief of staff to Prime Minister and Minister of the Interior Charles Floquet from April 1888 to March 1889.

In February 1890, he married Amélie Fontanes (1862–1913), with whom he had four children: René (1891), Marcel (1893), Suzanne (1894), and Jeanne (1896), who accompanied the family on their travels throughout France and the Indian Ocean.

Appointed prefect of the Pyrénées-Orientales at the end of that same month, he became prefect of Corsica in December 1895, but was appointed treasurer-paymaster general of the department of Mayenne in May 1896. After becoming Treasurer-Paymaster General of Vienne in September 1899, he assumed the office of Prefect of Haute-Loire in August 1901.

Appointed to the Vosges in March 1906, he became Governor of the Colonies, stationed in Réunion, on July 26, 1906. In 1907, Victor Augagneur, Governor-General of Madagascar, proposed that the island be annexed to Madagascar. On April 17, Bonhoure was informed of the plan. He submitted his opinion on July 1, in which he criticized Augagneur’s arguments by highlighting the internal challenges that would arise if this reform were implemented, deeming the proposed savings unrealistic, pointing out the lack of constitutional compliance, and arguing instead that the colony of Mayotte and its dependencies could be annexed to Madagascar. In his report, however, he acknowledged that Réunion could reduce its budget for judicial services without jeopardizing overall operations. Lucien Gasparin and Pierre Édouard Augustin Archambeaud, two deputies from Réunion, also protested against this plan, which they viewed as a loss of prestige and an insult from the metropolis. On September 15, many residents demonstrated at the Jardin de l'État, and on the 19th, Bonhoure was summoned to explain himself. On December 3, Augagneur presented his plan to the Council of Ministers. The plan was abandoned a few years later with the outbreak of World War I.

He became head of the French settlements in India in June 1908. From September 1909 to July 1910, he served as acting high commissioner in New Caledonia. Governor of the French settlements in Oceania from 1910 to 1912, he then became governor of the French Somali Coast from 1913 to 1914, where, via a decree dated October 27, 1913, he prohibited the recruitment of indigenous French subjects or foreign protected persons for the purpose of exhibitions.

== See also ==
- Colonial heads of Côte d'Ivoire
- List of colonial governors in 1900
- List of colonial governors in 1901
- List of colonial governors in 1902
- List of colonial governors in 1903
- List of colonial governors in 1904

Government offices
| Preceded by Louis Mouttet | Governor of Côte d'Ivoire; 1898–1898 | Succeeded by Jean Penel (Acting) |
| Preceded by Gabriel Louis Angoulvant (Acting) | Governor of French Somaliland; 6 December 1900–7 September 1901 | Succeeded by Louis Ormiéres (Acting) |
| Preceded by Louis Ormiéres (Acting) | Governor of French Somaliland; June 1902–23 May 1903 | Succeeded by Albert Dubarry (Acting) |
| Preceded by Albert Dubarry (Acting) | Governor of French Somaliland; 1903–1904 | Succeeded by Albert Dubarry (Acting) |
| Preceded by Marius Verignon | Governor of Réunion; 8 November 1906–27 December 1907 | Succeeded by Henri Cor |
| Preceded by Gabriel Louis Angoulvant | Governor of French India; 1908–1909 | Succeeded by Ernest Fernand Lévecque |
| Preceded by Joseph Pascal François | Governor of French Polynesia; 1910–1912 | Succeeded by Charles Hostein (Acting) |
