= Lucie Cousturier =

French painter and writer (1876–1925)

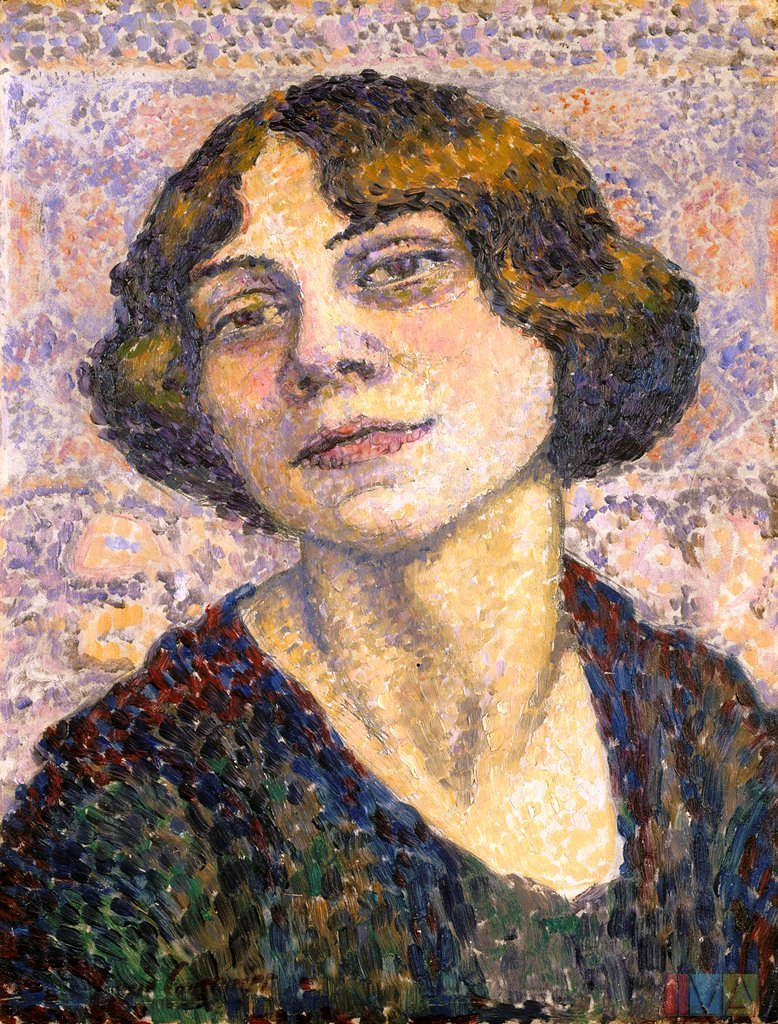
- Self portrait (1905-10)
- Born: Lucie Brû; 19 December 1876; Paris, France
- Died: 16 June 1925 (aged 48) > Paris, France
- Occupations: Painter, writer

Lucie Cousturier (19 December 1876 – 16 June 1925) was a French painter and writer. She was known for the sympathetic books she wrote about her experiences traveling in French West Africa in 1921–22.

== Early years ==
Lucie Brû was born in Paris on 19 December 1876. Her father was Léon Casimir Brû, the wealthy owner of a Parisian doll factory. She became interested in painting at the age of fourteen, and studied under Paul Signac and Henri-Edmond Cross. She was also a close friend of the pointillist Georges Seurat. She studied the work of these painters and painted in a similar style to them. On 6 January 1901 she married the painter and art critic Edmond Cousturier, taking her husband's name. Her husband's brother was Paul Cousturier, a member of the colonial administration in Africa.

Lucie Cousturier first exhibited at the Salon des Artistes Indépendants in 1901, and was to exhibit three to eight oils there every year until 1920. She exhibited at other exhibitions in Brussels and Berlin, and at the end of 1906 gave her first solo exhibition in Paris. By 1907 she had a perfect mastery of technique and color. In her later paintings, particularly outdoors scenes, her style became increasingly fluid and free, with warm and lively colors. In 1911, Lucie began her writing career by writing articles and monographs about the major members of the emerging Neo-Impressionist movement. She is credited for being the first specialist writer of the movement.

During World War I Lucie Cousturier lived in a house in Fréjus purchased in 1913, "Les Parasols", beside which there were camps where Senegalese riflemen staying before going up to the front. She visited the camps and decided to improve the soldiers' learning of the French language. For this purpose she organized literacy classes at home, and this would be the theme of a story on Des Inconnus chez moi (Some Strangers in my Home) that she published in 1920. The la Poursuite company adapted this work to the stage in 2014 to commemorate the centenary of the War.

== African travel and writings ==
The minister of colonies heard of Cousturier's work with the Senegalese, and gave her a mission to visit West Africa and to make a "study of the indigène's family milieu and, more particularly, the role of the female indigène with regard to the influence she exercises over the moral formation of children." She landed in Dakar on 13 October 1921 and spent the next seven months traveling in the region. She kept a journal in which she gave her impressions of the land, the people and the way in which she related to them, and she made sketches of what she saw. Her journal eventually formed the basis for two books. She was unprejudiced, related to people as she found them, went out of her way to form friendships with African women, and was always conscious of her own position as a member of the colonial elite.

Lucie Cousturier was one of the first to write on the subject of the relationships between Africans and Europeans, ahead of other French intellectuals such as André Gide with Voyage au Congo (1927) and Retour du Tchad (1928) and Michel Leiris with (L'Afrique fantôme (1934). She was critical of the colonial structure, but more critical of the patriarchal attitudes of the local people, which she saw as a major obstacle to progress. After her return to France she wrote in Le Paria (The Outcast), a newspaper for the black and yellow proletariat", (Note: In 1921 the Intercolonial Union was born, a radical group associated with the Communist Party. This group founded Le Paria in April 1922, a monthly where people from Indochina, the Maghreb, Caribbean, Africa and Malagasy could express themselves.) She devoted the rest of her life to the struggle for the emancipation of people of color.

In October 1923, for the re-opening of his Galerie de Bruxelles, George Giroux staged an exhibition of the works of Paul Signac and Lucie Cousturier, including 164 of her drawings and watercolors from the African journey. Some excerpts from her writings with some of her pictures were published in 1923. The literary journal Europe published a chapter of her work in 1924. Her complete work was published in 1925 as two volumes: Mes Inconnus chez eux: Mon ami Fatou (My strangers in their home: My friend Fatou) and Mes Inconnus chez eux: Mon ami Soumaré.

Lucie Cousturier died in Paris on 16 June 1925.Lucie leaves behind a legacy of artwork and writings of her African counterparts that have now become the subject of popular research. In an article published in 1925 the novelist René Maran said that she was "two eyes and a heart".

== Work ==
=== Pictures ===
Most paintings by Lucie Cousturier are in private collections.

- Autoportrait, huile sur bois vers 1905–1910, Indianapolis Museum of Art, Minneapolis
- Vase de fleurs, huile sur toile, Indianapolis Museum of Art
- Femme faisant du crochet, huile sur toile, v. 1908, Musée d'Orsay
- Woman Reading, huile sur toile, v. 1907, Museum of Modern Art

=== Literary works ===
- Des inconnus chez moi, 1920.
- La Forêt du Haut-Niger, 1923.
- Mes inconnus chez eux: 1. Mon amie Fatou, citadine. Paris: F. Rieder et Cie. 1925. p. 255.
- Mes inconnus chez eux: 2. Mon ami Soumaré, laptot, 1925.
