= Joseph Pascal François =

French colonial administrator

Governor General of French Polynesia
- In office 1908–1910
- Succeeded by: Adrien Jules Jean Bonhoure

Gouverneur Général de l'Inde française
- In office 1905–1906
- Preceded by: Philema Lemaire
- Succeeded by: Gabriel Louis Angoulvant

Governor of Guadeloupe (by acting)
- In office June 1900 – December 1901
- Preceded by: Delphino Moracchini
- Succeeded by: Martial Merlin

Personal details
- Born: 28 June 1853
- Died: 16 December 1914

Joseph Pascal François (1853–1914) was Governor General for various colonies in the Second French Colonial Empire under the Third Republic.

Government offices
Preceded by Élie Adrien Édouard Charlier (Acting)	Governor General of French Polynesia; 1908–1910	Succeeded by Adrien Jules Jean Bonhoure
Preceded by Philema Lemaire	Gouverneur Général de l'Inde française 1905–October 1906	Succeeded by Gabriel Louis Angoulvant
