= Norris Henry Young =

Pitcairnese politician

Norris Young

Chief Magistrate of Pitcairn
- In office 1948–1951
- Preceded by: Parkin Christian
- Succeeded by: Parkin Christian

Personal details
- Born: 15 August 1887; Pitcairn Island
- Died: 10 February 1974 (aged 86); Pitcairn Island

Norris Henry Young (15 August 1887 – 10 February 1974) was a Pitcairnese politician. He served as Chief Magistrate of Pitcairn Island, between 1945 and 1948.

== Biography ==
Young was born on Pitcairn in 1887, the son of Bert James Christian and Margaret Augusta Young. He married Marian Elmira Christian in January 1910. The couple had two children, Henry Hugh (born 1909) and Everett Carlyle (1910). Young also had children with Millie Flora Coffin (a son named Watson Rhodes Coffin born in 1924) and Elenor Warren (a daughter named Murial Joyce Warren born in 1928).

Between 1947 and 1950, he served as Chief Magistrate. He died in 1974 on Pitcairn Island.
