= Philema Lemaire =

Jean Baptiste Philémon Lemaire, also known as Philema Lemaire (7 July 1856 in Verberie, Oise, France – 6 May 1932 in Neuilly-Sur-Seine, Hauts-de-Seine, France) was a French politician.

He was Governor General of Pondicherry in Second French Colonial Empire, and Governor of Martinique from 1902 to 1903. Philema Lemaire, a member of Arthur Blocher's congregation, was also elected deputy in the French National Assembly (1907–14).

Government offices
Preceded by Louis Mouttet	Governor of Martinique; August 1902–October 1903	Succeeded by Louis Alphonse Bonhoure
Preceded by Victor Louis Marie Lanrezac	Gouverneur Général de l'Inde française August 1904–April 1905	Succeeded by Joseph Pascal François
