= John Lorenzo Christian =

Pitcairn Island politician (1895–1984)

John Lorenzo Christian (15 July 1895 - 28 June 1984) served as Chief Magistrate of the British Overseas Territory of Pitcairn Island between 1952 and 1954, and again from 1961 until 1966. He resigned as Magistrate in 1966 shortly before travelling to New Zealand for an eye operation.

He was the son of Gerard Bromley Robert Christian. He married Bernice Young. In 1980, he and his wife were the oldest couple on Pitcairn.
