= Edgar Allen Christian =

Pitcairn Island politician (1879–1960)

Edgar Allen Christian (1 January 1879 – 29 January 1960) was a politician from Pitcairn Island. He served as Chief Magistrate in 1923, 1924 and 1932. As is commonly the case with the small population of Pitcairn, he was closely related to several other island leaders, notably brother Frederick Martin Christian, cousins Gerard Bromley Robert Christian and Charles Richard Parkin Christian, and grandfather Thursday October Christian II.
