= Cyril Wool-Lewis =

British Commissioner of the Turks and Caicos Islands

Cyril Eric Wool-Lewis (1906 – 1975) was a British Colonial administrator whose responsibilities included the Turks and Caicos Islands.

Wool-Lewis was educated at Cambridge University. He rowed in the winning Cambridge boat in the Boat Race in 1929.

From 1947 to 1952, Wool-Lewis was Commissioner of the Turks and Caicos Islands. He was awarded the O.B.E in the 1951 New Year Honours.

== See also ==
- List of Cambridge University Boat Race crews
