= List of commissioners of the Turks and Caicos Islands =

The commissioner of the Turks and Caicos was the administrator of the Turks and Caicos Islands from 1874 to 1959.

A list of commissioners:

- Daniel Thomas Smith 1874–1878
- Edward Noel Walker 1878
- Robert Baxter Llewelyn 1878–1883
- Frederick Shedden Sanguinetti (1847–1906) 1883–1885
- Henry Moore Jackson 1885–1888
- Alexis Wynns Harriott 1888–1891
- Henry Huggins (Governor) 1891–1893
- Edward John Cameron (1858–1901) 1893–1899
- Geoffrey Peter St. Aubyn (1858–1947) 1899–1901
- William Douglas Young 1901–1905
- Frederick Henry Watkins (1859–1928) 1905–1914
- George Whitfield Smith (1861–1934) 1914–1923
- Harold Ernest Phillips (1877–1941) 1923–1932
- Hugh Houston Hutchings (1869–1937) 1933–1934
- Frank Cecil Clarkson 1934–1936
- Hugh Charles Norwood Hill 1936–1940
- Edwin Porter Arrowsmith (1909–1992) 1940–1946
- Cyril Eric Wool-Lewis 1947–1952
- Peter Bleackley (1915-) 1952–1955
- Ernest Gordon Lewis (1918–2006) 1955–1958
- Geoffrey Colin Guy 1958–1959
