= Frederick Martin Christian =

Pitcairn Island politician (1883–1971)

Frederick Martin "Fred" Christian (18 December 1883 – 17 December 1971) was a politician from Pitcairn. He was the Chief Magistrate of Pitcairn Island on three occasions between 1921 and 1943, and was a Pitcairn councillor in 1956.

Christian was the son of Daniel Christian and Harriet Melissa McCoy. He married Flora Clarice Warren. As is commonly the case with the small population of Pitcairn, he was closely related to several other island leaders, notably brother Edgar Allen Christian, cousins Gerard Bromley Robert Christian and Charles Richard Parkin Christian, and grandfather Thursday October Christian II.

Christian was described as "a titan of a man, with a voice that seemed to well up from the bottom of his 6'6" (1.98m) frame." He was also a noted craftsman and cartographer. One of his maps appeared on a Pitcairn Island stamp in 2017.
