= Gerard Bromley Robert Christian =

Pitcairn Island politician (1870–1919)

Gerard Bromley Robert Christian (19 February 1870 - c. June 1919) served as Magistrate of the British Overseas Territory of Pitcairn Island from 1910 to 1919. As is commonly the case with the small population of Pitcairn, he was closely related to several other island leaders, notably cousins Edgar Allen Christian, Frederick Martin Christian, and Charles Richard Parkin Christian. He was also the grandson of Thursday October Christian II and was the father of John Lorenzo Christian. He was born and died on Pitcairn Island.
