= Jean Louis Georges Poiret =

French colonial officer, Lieutenant Governor of Guinea (1872–1932)

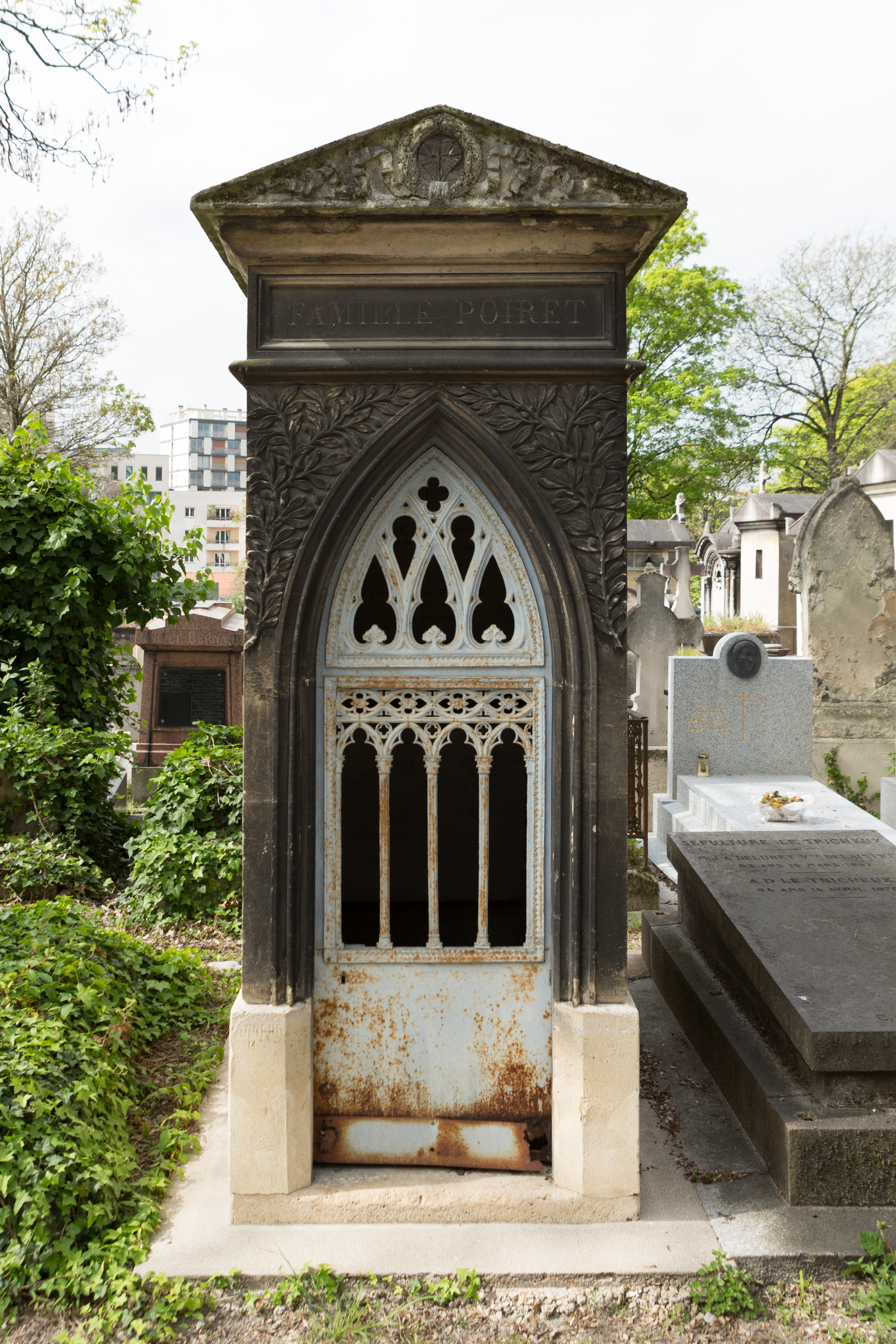
The tomb of Georges Poiret in Père-Lachaise Cemetery.

Jean Louis Georges Poiret (25 April 1872 – 1932) was Lieutenant-Governor of Guinea when it was a French colony. Born in Le Mans, he served twice as acting Governor of French Guinea; 9 May 1912 to 7 March 1913 and from 23 October 1915 to 12 October 1916. After that, he continued to serve as governor until 21 July 1929. Poiret was known for breaking strikes, he believed African workers did not have the right to go on strike. He believed in enforcing a rigid colonial hierarchy, he lowered pay for African workers and raised pay for European workers who were doing the same tasks, believing that this would further reinforce the power structure. Poiret did not like the évolué system, and he had almost as évolué bureaucrats in the colony fired and replaced with white French bureaucrats. This included every single employee of the railway system that was not involved exclusively with manual labor.
