= Louis-Placide Blacher =

French colonial official (1883-1960)

Louis-Placide Blacher (5 October 1883 in Saint-Pierre, Martinique – 26 October 1960 in Paris) was a French colonial official. He was governor of Niger, Dahomey, French Somaliland and Guinea.

Blacher came from Martinique and had African ancestors. In 1905 he began to work for the French colonial administration in Madagascar and later moved to French West Africa. There he was particularly involved in recruiting African soldiers during the First World War. Similar to Félix Éboué, who also had a black skin color and was not born in Africa, the French colonial administration calculated so that Blacher could take on the role of a "middleman" between the African people and their European rulers. He was appointed governor of the Nigerian colony of French West Africa in 1930, which he remained until 1931. In 1932 he was governor of Dahomey, from 1932 to 1934 governor of French Somaliland and finally from 1936 to 1940 governor of Guinea. In October 1938, married Blacher in Conakry, the artist Béatrice Appia, widow of Eugène Dabit.
