= Charles Richard Parkin Christian =

Pitcairn Island politician

Charles Richard Parkin Christian (27 November 1883 - 15 September 1971) was a long-serving politician from Pitcairn. He was the Chief Magistrate of Pitcairn Island for eleven years at various times between 1920 and 1957. As is commonly the case with the small population of Pitcairn, he was closely related to several other island leaders, notably cousins Edgar Allen Christian, Frederick Martin Christian, and Gerard Bromley Robert Christian. He was also the grandson of Thursday October Christian II and uncle of Ivan Christian and Warren Clive Christian. Christian was born on Pitcairn, and died in Auckland, New Zealand.
