= Antoine Marie Frézouls =

French colonial administrator

Antoine-Marie-Auguste Frézouls

Lieutenant Governor of Guinea
- In office 28 September 1904 (Acting to 15 October 1904) – 27 March 1906
- Preceded by: Paul Jean Francois Cousturier
- Succeeded by: Jules Louis Richard (acting)

Personal details
- Born: 7 July 1860 Albi, Tarn department, France

Antoine-Marie-Auguste Frézouls (born 7 July 1860) was a French colonial administrator who was Lieutenant Governor of French Guinea from September 1904 to March 1906.

== Early years ==
Antoine-Marie–Auguste Frézouls was born on 7 July 1860 in Albi, in the Tarn department of southern France. He was commissioned in the Navy on 1 November 1881. Later he was made an inspector of colonies. In 1896 he donated a copper lamp, three statuettes and a drum from Dahomey to the museum of Albi. He was made a Chevalier of the Legion of Honor on 11 July 1896, and was promoted to an officer of the Legion of Honor on 29 July 1901.

== Governor of Guinea ==
Frézouls took office as acting Lieutenant Governor of Guinea on 28 September 1904 and was confirmed on 15 October 1904. He was a Radical Republican. He declared that he intended to introduce reforms, and immediately aroused hostility from the French residents. One group said he was "filling the colony with terrible terror." An official said he "undertook hasty reforms without knowing the country." Alfa Yaya had been made chief of Labé, Kade and Gabu after the Bokar Biro, the last independent almami of the Imamate of Futa Jallon, had been defeated. Alfa Yaya's rule was harsh, he demanded a share of tax receipts, and he was thought to be plotting with the Portuguese. He was arrested in October 1905 and sentenced to five years in prison in Abomey on charges of plotting against France.

In 1905 Frézouls heard allegations of extortion and abuse of power by Ernest Noirot, the Director of Native Affairs. Two of Noirot's protegés were implicated: Hubert, the administrator of Fouta Djallon, and Boubou Penda, Noirot's interpreter. Frézouls launched an investigation. He suspended Noirot and Hubert, and arrested Boubou Penda. Press reports in 1906 were generally hostile to the governor, embarrassing his superiors.

== Later career ==
Frézouls was removed from office on 27 March 1906. A libel suit was brought against him. Eventually the case against Hubert and Noirot was abandoned in 1909. On 17 June 1922 Frézouls was sentenced to fifteen months in prison and a fine of 5,000 francs for breach of trust. He was expelled from the Legion of Honor.
