= Paul Cousturier =

Governor of French Guinea from 1900 to 1904

Paul Jean François Cousturier

Acting Governor of Ivory Coast
- In office 1895–1895
- Preceded by: Louis Gustave Binger
- Succeeded by: Joseph Lemaire

Governor of French Guinea
- In office 2 November 1900 – 28 September 1904
- Preceded by: Noël Ballay
- Succeeded by: Antoine Marie Frézouls

Governor of Saint Pierre and Miquelon
- In office 8 December 1904 – 9 June 1905
- Preceded by: Maurice Caperon
- Succeeded by: Gabriel Louis Angoulvant

Acting Lieutenant Governor of Gabon
- In office 19 April 1905 – 5 August 1905
- Preceded by: Louis Auguste Bertrand Ormières
- Succeeded by: Alfred Fourneau

Paul Jean François Cousturier (14 April 1849 – 27 July 1921) was governor of French Guinea, 2 November 1900 to 28 September 1904. After his retirement, he became a well-known botanist.

== Early years ==
Paul Cousturier was born on 14 April 1849 in Montereau, Seine-et-Marrte. His brother Edmond Cousturier was an illustrator and art critic, who married the artist Lucie Cousturier on 6 January 1901.

Paul Cousturier entered the colonial administration in August 1885. On 16 August 1885 he was appointed Chief of the Administrative Secretariat of the French Establishments in the Gulf of Guinea under Noël Ballay. On 24 October 1887 Cousturier was named sous-chef of the interior of the colony, where he introduced the colonial administration. He followed Ballay to Rivières du Sud, and with him explored the Conakry region, where the city of Conakry was established in 1889. He assisted Ballay in delimiting the boundary between Rivières du Sud and Sierra Leone.

== French Guinea ==
In December 1891, Cousturier was named governor of Guinea, replacing Ballay. He was acting governor of the Rivières du Sud region, now Guinea, between October 1891 and January 1892. He was again acting governor of Guinea from 22 July 1892 to June 1893 during the absence of Noël Ballay. He was governor of Guinea again between 1895 and 1896, and was made acting governor of Guinea again in 1898.

On 3 November 1900 he was named governor of French Guinea, holding this post until November 1904. The sixth annual Agricultural fair was held in Conakry on 15 February 1902. Alfa Yaya, chief of the province of Labé came to pay homage to governor Cousturier accompanied by more than 1,000 men and sixty horses. In 1902 Cousturier established a line of six customs posts from Dankaldou to Kolodougou along the Liberian border. In November 1902 he opened the railway from Conakry to Simbaya, the first part of a longer line to Kindia, opened two years later.

== Later career ==
When he returned to France in November 1904 he had spent twenty years in Africa, apart from four leaves totaling twenty one months. He left for Saint Pierre and Miquelon the same month. He was governor of St Pierre and Miquelon for a year after leaving Guinea.

After his retirement he devoted himself to botany, making long trips in which he explored the mountains of Corsica, Crete and Andorra. He became a member of the Botanical Society of France in 1911. Paul Cousturier joined the Société d'histoire naturelle de Toulon in 1912. He died on 27 July 1921 at Aix-en-Provence. His botanical collections and his correspondence with his colleague, the Abbé Michel Gandoger, were kept by the University of Provence in Marseille.

== Bibliography ==
- Gandoger, Michel; Cousturier, Paul (1913). Florule de la Republique d'Andorre. Bull. Soc. Bot. Fr.
- Gandoger, Michel; Cousturier, Paul (1916). Herborisation en Crète: 1913-1914. Soc. botanique de France.

== Sources ==
- Annales de L'Académie de Mácon. 1907. p. lxxvii.
- Berliner, Brett A. (2002). "Lucia Cousturier in African Fraternity and the Challenge to Exoticism". Ambivalent Desire: The Exotic Black Other in Jazz-Age France. Univ of Massachusetts Press. ISBN 978-1-55849-356-8.
- Dürr, Pierre-André (March 1902). "Le Concours Agricole de 1902 à Conakry en textes et en cartes postales" (PDF). I&M - Bulletin n°25.
- "Gouverneur des Rivières du Sud par intérim : Paul Cousturier (octobre 1891/janvier 1892)". Archives nationales d'outre-mer.
- "Guinée Française Gouverneurs et Chefs du Territoire". webGuinée.
- Jahandiez, E. (1909). "Paul COUSTURIER (1849-1921)". Annales du Société d'histoire naturelle de Toulon.
- Laissus, Yves; France. Comité des travaux historiques et scientifiques (1995). Les naturalistes français en Amérique du sud: XVIe-XIXe siècles (in French). Éditions du CTHS. p. 420. ISBN 978-2-7355-0316-2.
- Lanfranchi, Adèle de (2008). Lucie Cousturier 1876-1925. Adèle de Lanfranchi. p. 91. ISBN 978-2-906130-03-6.
- Little, Roger (2009). Lucie Cousturier, les tirailleurs sénégalais et la question coloniale: actes du colloque international tenu à Fréjus les 13 et 14 juin 2008, augmentés de lettres adressées à Paul Signal et Léon Werth. l'Harmattan. ISBN 978-2-296-07348-7.
- Murdza, Peter J. (1979). The Tricolor and the Lone Star: A History of Franco-Liberian Relations 1847-1930. University of Wisconsin--Madison. p. 425.
- Revue française d'histoire d'outre mer. La Société. 1967. p. 40.
- Société Botanique de France (1920). Bulletin. La Société. p. 258.
- Société d'études scientifiques de l'Aude, Carcassonne (1921). Bulletin.
- Stewart, John (2006). African states and rulers. McFarland & Co. ISBN 978-0-7864-2562-4.
