= Justice in Wallis and Futuna =

Justice in Wallis and Futuna, a French overseas collectivity, functions under two distinct systems: customary justice and French judicial law. Until the 1990s, the majority of Wallisians and Futunians relied primarily on customary justice, which applies to minor offenses and land disputes. More serious crimes are adjudicated by the court of first instance or the court of appeal in Nouméa, New Caledonia. A public prosecutor based in Wallis oversees cases under common law within the court of first instance in Mata-Utu. French criminal justice is often perceived by local populations as being intended mainly for Europeans and residents from metropolitan France. The customary system is also practiced by Wallisians and Futunians living in New Caledonia for resolving intra-community conflicts. These two systems differ significantly in their principles, cultural foundations, and objectives. While they long operated separately, tensions between them have increased since the 1990s, leading to several political crises. During this period, a local penal institution was also established with the opening of the Mata-Utu penitentiary, which handles offenses and crimes committed by residents of Wallis and Futuna.

== History ==
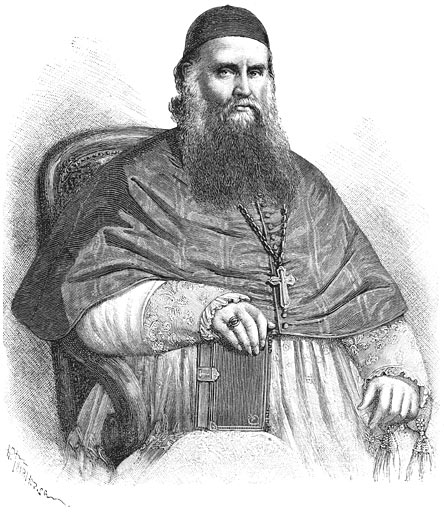
Pierre Bataillon codified Wallisian customary law in 1870.

Customary justice in Wallis and Futuna was codified in 1870 by missionary Pierre Bataillon through the Code de Wallis (Tohi fono o Uvea). The code established a series of moral principles and prohibited acts based on Catholic doctrine, along with corresponding sanctions. It also regulated marriage and prohibited the sale of land to foreigners. The district chiefs of Uvea were designated as presidents of the customary courts. In 1933, during the French protectorate, a decree of the colonial administration created a justice of the peace, allowing Wallisians and Futunians to be judged alongside French citizens in certain cases. Nonetheless, their classification as “natives” maintained their subordination to the authority of the kings and customary chiefs. The 1961 territorial statute granted French nationality to the inhabitants while preserving the coexistence of two judicial systems. (Note: Unless they expressly renounce their status, they are considered citizens subject to common law (Douaire‑Marsaudon 2018, paragraph 22).) Although all residents became French citizens, they remained subject to distinct legal frameworks. The same law introduced a significant reform by placing criminal cases under French law, thereby limiting the scope of customary justice, which continued to govern matters related to land. (Note: Unlike Article 4 of the 1961 law, which had stipulated that the procedures for land management would be determined by decree, the article was ultimately repealed (Douaire‑Marsaudon 2018, paragraph 22).)

Anthropologist Sophie Chave-Dartoen observes that the 1961 statute was conceived by legislators as an initial step toward legal unification that would eventually diminish the authority of customary institutions. However, this objective was never realized, and the coexistence of the two systems has persisted, reflecting, according to Chave-Dartoen, the continued resistance of Wallisian society to full assimilation into the republican framework.

In 1978, an order from the High Commissioner of the Republic sought to structure customary justice through the creation of a local law jurisdiction, but this initiative was never implemented in practice.

== Statutes ==
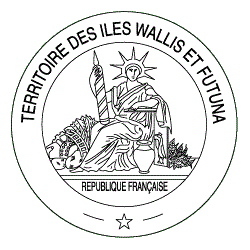
Wallis and Futuna bucket used in particular at the Mata-Utu court.

People born in Wallis and Futuna are subject to a special legal framework known in French law as statut personnel (personal status). There is no civil registry in the territory, but baptism records maintained by the Catholic Church are considered official. There are also no municipalities, as villages are administered by village chiefs. Wallisians and Futunians living in New Caledonia, mainland France, or elsewhere who were not born in Wallis and Futuna are not subject to this customary status but to common law. It is possible for people born in Wallis and Futuna to request common law status under French law, although this is rare, typically involving children of mixed Wallisian–metropolitan parentage.

This coexistence of customary and common law systems is also found in New Caledonia.

== Organization of customary justice ==
Customary justice in Wallis and Futuna functions on several levels: the village, (Note: Headed by a pule kolo, village chief.) the district (in Wallis), (Note: Headed by a faipule, district chief.) and the kingdom. The king serves as the highest judicial authority, and his participation is required in the most serious cases, such as murder. Customary trials are held in the fale fono (council house) and conducted faka fenua—that is, in accordance with traditional ceremony and entirely orally. It is customary to present a kava root to the chiefs at the beginning of proceedings. Both the defendants and the plaintiffs may speak during the trial. A man appointed by the customary chiefs (in Wallis, the Tu‘ifakamau) presides over the discussions and provides his opinion on the dispute, while the customary chiefs act as judges and render the final decision.

In Wallis and Futuna, customary sanctions typically involve paying fines to the chiefs, which may be settled with money, food, or community labor. The primary aim of customary justice is to restore social harmony rather than to punish the offender or provide reparation. The procedure of requesting forgiveness (te fai hu) is a common outcome, in which the person found guilty asks forgiveness from the victim’s family and provides a meal for them, the chiefs, and others involved. This customary pardon is required in cases of murder.

Catholicism is integrated into customary practice, with divine justice regarded as the ultimate authority, superseding that of the customary kings.

== Contradictions of customary justice and crises ==
In Wallis and Futuna, customary justice does not include a separation of powers, as customary chiefs exercise both executive and judicial authority. Justice is conducted entirely orally, without reliance on written rules. During the 1990s, a period of significant social and economic change, customary chiefs increasingly faced criticism from the population, who accused some of abusing their positions for personal gain. For the first time, Wallisians brought chiefs before courts under the French legal system. Customary justice often overlaps with French justice. In land disputes, for example, if acts of violence occur, the matter falls under common law; however, the customary chiefs aim to resolve the issue comprehensively, addressing both the land and criminal aspects to restore social harmony. This has led to an ongoing discussion between customary authorities and magistrates of the common-law system regarding competence in these cases.

=== The Make Pilioko affair ===
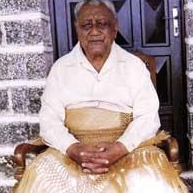
King Tomaski Kulimoetoke in 2007.

In 1998, Make Pilioko, (Note: Make Pilioko is referred to as “K.” by Françoise Douaire-Marsaudon in order to anonymize her, but her name is cited by other sources such as Frédéric Angleviel.) a high-ranking ‘aliki woman and member of the territorial assembly close to King Tomasi Kulimoetoke, was accused of embezzlement. The ministers of the Lavelua (king) reportedly pressured the public prosecutor not to pursue the case. Tried by the court in Nouméa, she was sentenced to two years in prison, six months of which were to be served. Make Pilioko refused to appear before the court and took refuge in the royal palace. Wallisian gendarmes assigned to arrest her did not enter the palace, reportedly out of deference to the king. The case created division on the island. Some, including Senator Robert Laufoaulu, defended the Lavelua, while others, such as Deputy Victor Brial and the customary prime minister (kalae kivalu) (Note: The kalae kivalu was dismissed from his functions by the Lavelua after taking a position in favor of common-law justice (Douaire‑Marsaudon 2018, paragraph 38).) Mikaele Hoatau, argued that French justice should apply and that customary status should not grant impunity. Following this disagreement, the Lavelua dismissed the kalae kivalu on April 14, 1999.

The case received national attention when Make Pilioko requested amnesty from the President of the French Republic, Jacques Chirac. To avoid conflict with the Lavelua, Chirac granted a general amnesty after his re-election in 2002. Make Pilioko regained her civil rights and subsequently ran in the territorial elections but was not elected.

After local articles criticized the affair in the weekly Te Fenua fo’ou, the Lavelua ordered the newspaper’s closure in March 2002, and the customary authorities confiscated the journalists’ computer equipment.

Anthropologist and historian Françoise Douaire-Marsaudon highlighted the distinctiveness of this affair, noting that the complaint was filed by Make Pilioko’s colleagues, members of the Wallisian elite, whereas previously such disputes would have first been addressed by the customary chiefs. This deviation from customary norms indicated a level of distrust toward customary justice among certain members of the population. Conversely, Make Pilioko’s decision to evade French authorities by taking refuge with the king reinforced the perception of the primacy of custom over republican law. Some Wallisians considered her actions justified, interpreting them as assistance to the elderly king in accordance with customary practice. The financial support she provided was viewed as more legitimate because the allowance paid by the French state to the king was comparatively small relative to the salaries of metropolitan expatriates. (Note: In the 1990s, metropolitan civil servants earned more than twice the salary of local civil servants—a situation that was a source of tension and numerous strikes (Douaire‑Marsaudon 2018, note 27).) Finally, for a significant portion of the Wallisian population, the supreme authority and highest judicial power resides with the customary king rather than with the French prefect, making recourse to customary justice necessary in their view.

=== Wallisian customary crisis ===
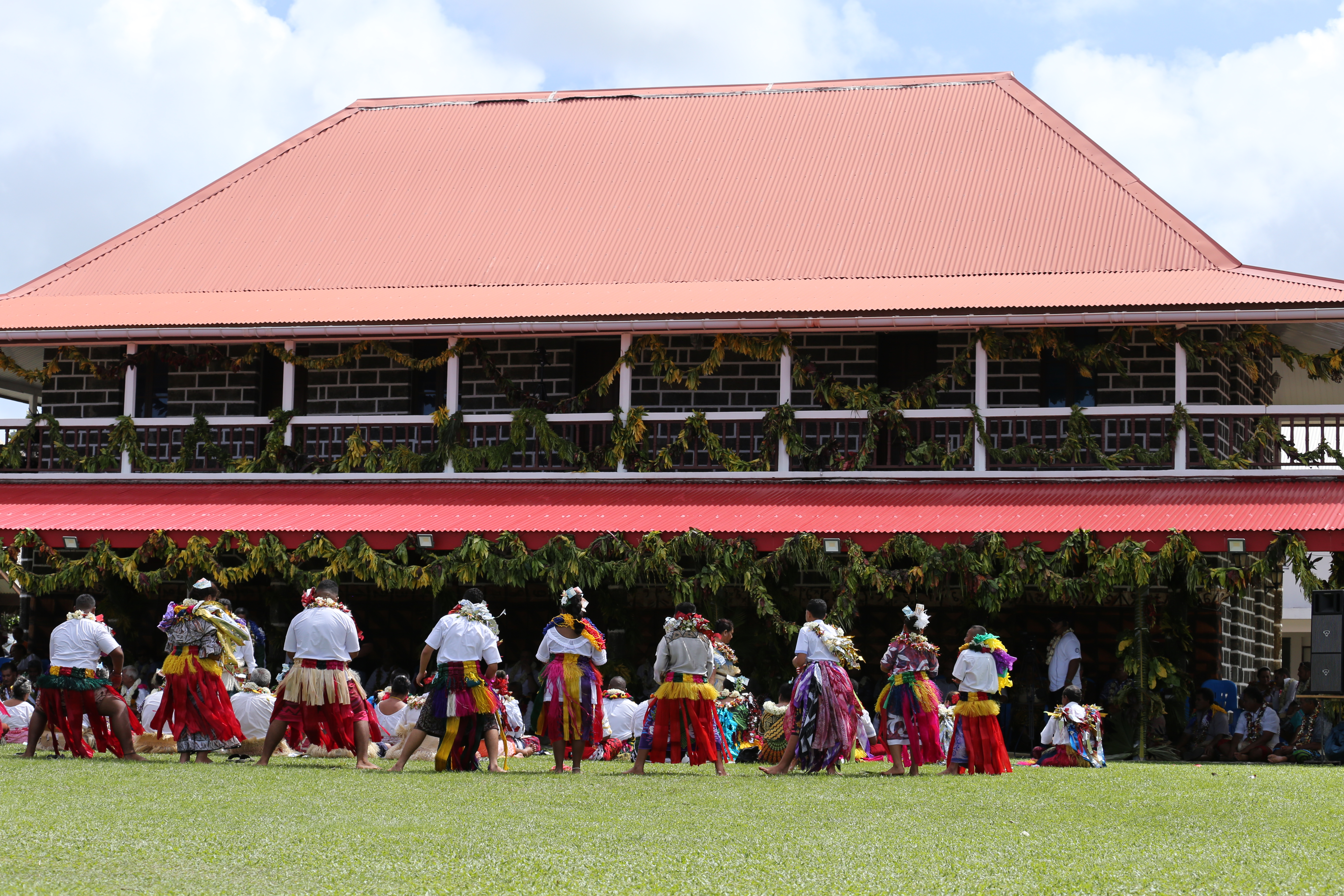
The royal palace of Uvea during a traditional celebration.

Similar incidents occurred in 2001, when one of the king’s grandsons sought refuge in the royal palace after being accused of rape, and in 2005, when another grandson, accused of manslaughter following a road accident, evaded the gendarmes by taking refuge in the palace. The 2005 incident generated significant division within Wallisian society between supporters of the king and reformists advocating for changes to customary authority. This customary crisis persisted for several years and resurfaced following the death of King Tomasi Kulimoetoke.

=== Analysis of the conflict between the two systems ===
Olivier Aimot, the first president of the Court of Appeal of Nouméa, described this historical development as a gradual strengthening of republican jurisdiction at the expense of customary jurisdiction. However, Françoise Douaire-Marsaudon argues that the situation should not be viewed as a conflict between tradition and modernity, or as the triumph of one system over the other. Instead, she notes that the Wallisian population has become increasingly aware of how the dual legal system operates, allowing them to navigate its contradictions and limitations. Douaire-Marsaudon characterizes this as a progressive reappropriation by Wallisians of justice as a tool of collective and civic life.

== See also ==
- Politics of Wallis and Futuna
- Customary kings of Wallis and Futuna

== Bibliography ==
- Douaire‑Marsaudon, Françoise (2018). "Droit coutumier et loi républicaine dans une collectivité d'outre‑mer française (Wallis‑et‑Futuna)" [Customary law and republican law in a French overseas collectivity (Wallis and Futuna)]. Ethnologie française (in French). 169 (1): 81–92. doi:10.3917/ethn.181.0081. ISSN 0046-2616.
- de Deckker, Paul (2010). "Grandeurs et misère du voisinage des cultures juridiques dans le Pacifique insulaire" [The grandeur and misery of the proximity of legal cultures in the Pacific Islands]. Cultures juridiques et gouvernance dans l'espace francophone: présentation générale d'une problématique [Legal cultures and governance in the French-speaking world: an overview of the issues] (in French). Archives contemporaines. ISBN 978-2-8130-0017-0.
