= Wallisian customary crisis =

Political crisis on the island of Wallis

The Wallisian customary crisis was a political crisis on the island of Wallis, in the Wallis and Futuna overseas collectivity. The crisis, which began in the 1990s, manifested itself in 2005 in a dispute over the succession to the title of customary king (lavelua) of the Kingdom of Uvea after the very long reign of Tomasi Kulimoetoke. The king's supporters clashed with the “renovators”, who wanted to see a change in custom and a sharing of power. This crisis continued during the reign of Kapeliele Faupala, then resumed in 2016 with the enthronement of two rival lavelua (Tominiko Halagahu and Patalione Kanimoa, the latter finally recognized by the French state). It highlighted the deep divisions that ran through Wallis society and created tensions between the customary chieftaincy and representatives of the French state, who were taken to task and witnessed. It was also followed by the Wallisians and Futunians of New Caledonia. In 2023, Wallisian society was still divided.

== Crisis of 2005 ==
=== Context ===
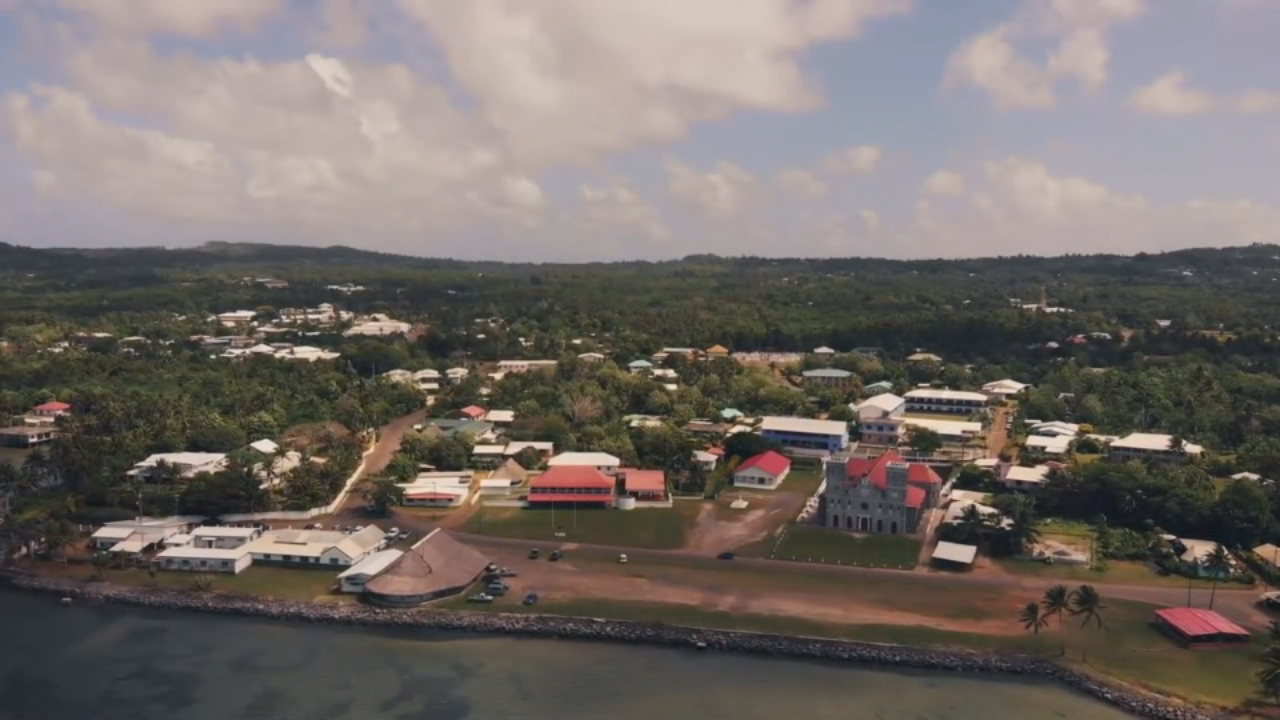
Mata Utu, the capital of Wallis and Futuna, is the main center of political, religious, and customary power.

The 1961 statute creating the overseas territory of Wallis and Futuna recognized the traditional justice of the lavelua in Wallisian affairs (land management in particular), and confirmed the status of special law enjoyed by Wallisians and Futunians since 1933. On the other hand, the Wallisians considered French criminal justice to be the preserve of the papalagi (Europeans, metropolitans): customary matters were handled between Wallisians by the local royalty.

The crisis began at the end of the reign of lavelua Tomasi Kulimoetoke. The latter, enthroned in 1959, had the longest reign in Uvea history (48 years), compared with an average of 5.6 years since 1869. According to Frédéric Angleviel, this was due to the political skill of the king who, despite the existence of rival royal families, managed to hold on to power thanks to the support of the French administration and the members of the chieftaincy, many of whom belonged to the Kulimoetoke family and did not wish to lose their advantages after so many years.

=== Court case and customary divisions ===
The crisis began in January 2005, when a grandson of Uvea King Tomasi Kulimoetoke II was sentenced to 18 months in prison for manslaughter after killing a motorcyclist while driving drunk.

The royal family made a customary pardon (in Wallisian faihu) to the victim's family, and thus considered the case settled from the point of view of customary justice. However, the French authorities of the time considered that the case, being one of reckless homicide, fell under the jurisdiction of the French criminal justice system, and decided to arrest the king's grandson. There was a long delay between the fatal accident and the judicial decision, given that the territory was attached to New Caledonia for judicial purposes.

To escape the gendarmes who had come to arrest him, the grandson took refuge in the royal palace for four months. At first, the king resisted requests to arrest his grandson. This choice divided the aristocratic families, split between customary solidarity (with the grandson and the king) and loyalty to the French tutelary power (the territory's economy depended in part on state aid, and the administration employed many people). There were two opposing camps: on the one hand, the royalists, supporters of King Kulimoetoke, and on the other, the “renovators”, who wanted to see a change in custom. On May 13, 2005, the Grand Chieftaincy asked the Superior Administrator (Prefect) Christian Job to leave the territory and demanded the closure of the Territorial Assembly. In response, the latter suspended payment of the lavelua's rent, as well as the customary chiefs supporting him (including the Prime Minister, Kapeliele Faupala). A new chiefdom was appointed on May 22 by the “renovators”. To put an end to tensions between the two camps, forty gendarmes were sent from New Caledonia on June 7. The lavelua's grandson was arrested.

The traditional chiefs of Futuna also expressed their opposition to Tomasi Kulimoetoke and called for the establishment of a vice-prefecture in Futuna, so that it would no longer depend on Wallis.

On June 14, a demonstration in support of Tomasi Kulimoetoke was organized by his prime minister (kivalu), and 150 supporters of the Kulimoetoke clan attempted to prevent the appointment of the new chiefdom, injuring a former reformist traditional chief. The appointment finally took place in the afternoon, and Clovis Logologofolau was enthroned as the new kivalu. Tensions grew between the two camps, as well as between the royalists and the prefect, who had transferred the compensation paid by the French state to the renovationist chiefs.

=== Constitutional conflict stalls ===
In September 2005, a delegation of renovators left for New Caledonia to inform the many Wallisians living there about the crisis, believing that the only local media, RFO-Wallis, supported the royalist camp. The delegation announced its intention to enthrone a new king, Ahu Hiasinito, former chief of the Hihifo district. However, as the September 25 enthronement ceremony approached, the institutional conflict almost turned into a confrontation: the king's supporters took up arms, occupied the airport, and set up roadblocks despite the presence of 120 gendarmes.

The situation was finally resolved the following day when a French mediator sent from Nouméa recognized the authority of King Tomasi Kulimoetoke II. The dissidents' enthronement ceremony was cancelled, but the authority of the new prefect, Xavier de Fürst, who had authorized it, was undermined. Xavier de Fürst issued several decrees recognizing the renovating traditional chiefs.

The Wallisian community in New Caledonia, particularly the traditional chiefs, overwhelmingly supported the current lavelua. A delegation led by Aloisio Sako, president of the Oceanian Democratic Rally, traveled to Wallis to reaffirm its allegiance to Tomaski Kulimoetoke. On September 22, a demonstration in Nouméa brought together 600 supporters of the King, who accused France of wanting to change the 1961 statute, a charge denied by the Prefect. Within the Wallisian community of New Caledonia, some voices were raised to denounce the divisions.

On October 10, a young “renovator” was struck with a machete by a royalist and died of his injuries the following day. The accused was transferred to Nouméa for trial. Following this episode, several “renovators” like Clovis Logologofolau chose to leave Wallis, feeling that their safety was not assured. For Frédéric Angleviel, this was the third stage of the crisis. The outcome of the institutional conflict seemed highly uncertain.

On March 12, 2007, the Mata Utu Administrative Court examined some fifty appeals lodged by the Kingdom of Uvea to overturn the prefectoral decrees issued by Xavier de Fürst. The Administrative Court finally annulled the decisions taken by Mr. de Fürst and ordered the French State to pay compensation to the territorial division of Uvea, interpreting the 1961 statute as prohibiting interference by the French State in customary affairs.

== Reign of Kapeliele Faupala (2008-2014) ==
On May 7, 2007, Tomasi Kulimoetoke II died at the age of 88: his reign had been one of the longest in the history of Wallis, from 1959 to 2007 (48 years). After the period of customary mourning, the royal families began negotiations and palaver to appoint a new king. In July 2008, Kapeliele Faupala was enthroned as lavelua.

Incidents on the island, mixing customary law and republican authorities, continued when, in 2010, King Kapeliele Faupala and his supporters seized EEWF (Électricité et Eau de Wallis-et-Futuna), a subsidiary of GDF-Suez. The action was prompted by the dismissal of an EEWF employee for gross misconduct, a dismissal contested by the chiefdom, and resulted in the water and electricity supply being cut off for several days in July 2010.

Kapeliele Faupala was deposed on September 2, 2014, following disagreements with his prime minister. Wallis no longer had a king.

In 2015, ten years after the 2005 crisis, reconciliation between the two sides seemed “unlikely, given that the mutual wounds from the 2005 conflict are still raw” and the island remained divided.

== Establishment of two rival monarchies (April 2016) ==
=== Crisis of April 2016 ===
In April 2016, new tensions erupted around the proposed enthronement of a new king. On Friday, April 1, the chiefdom announced the forthcoming enthronement of Tominiko Halagahu, chief of the Hihifo district. This was unexpected news, after more than two years without lavelua in Wallis. Some of the royal families, opposed to this choice, appointed a new chieftaincy. Their supporters occupied the royal palace at Sagato Soane (in Mata-Utu) from April 12. While an agreement seemed to have been reached between the two camps on the 14th, the incumbent chieftaincy did not attend the negotiations the following day. Supporters of the new chieftaincy announced their refusal to accept the enthronement and continued to occupy the royal palace. Meanwhile, Tominiko Halagahu was enthroned at his home in Vailala, in the Hihifo district (north), on April 15. Wallis-et-Futuna 1re comments on the situation: “A point of no return has been reached. The enthronement took place under conditions and in a place that they [the new chiefdom] cannot accept”.

On April 17, the new chiefdom (representing a large proportion of the royal families) also enthroned a lavelua, Patalione Kanimoa, following the traditional ceremony in the royal palace. Wallis thus found itself in an unprecedented customary situation, with two kings and two chiefdoms. “The population is totally divided”. For anthropologist Françoise Douaire-Marsaudon, the French had to remain absolutely neutral and let the Wallisians settle the crisis among themselves. She believed that this division between two competing lavelua was partly explained by the after-effects of the 2005 customary crisis.

As the “republican” option (abolition of the monarchy and integration of customary chiefs into political parties as territorial elected representatives, as in New Caledonia) wasn't favored neither by the Wallisians (including “reformers”) nor by Paris, the Prefect had to arbitrate between the two camps. “The State does not interfere in customary affairs”; nevertheless, in this situation, not making a decision was also understood as taking a stand. In the end, the French state recognized Takumasiva Aisake Patalione Kanimoa as a lavelua. The latter was also a territorial elected official and chairman of the finance committee of the Wallis and Futuna Territorial Assembly. The decision (taken on April 18) was published in the Official Journal of Wallis and Futuna on June 3, 2016.

On May 28, 2016, two village chiefs and a faipule (district chief) were installed by the new chiefdom: “Now Wallis has two lavelua and two big chiefdoms in full”.

=== Consequences ===
In May 2017, a financial partnership was finally concluded between the official chiefdom, Prefect Marcel Renouf, and the two Wallis stevedoring companies; it introduced an 18% tax on all imported products, which was paid to an association close to the official lavelua. According to Mediapart, this amounted to around ten million euros a year, driving up the price of already expensive foreign goods.

In 2018, these two chiefdoms celebrated St. Joseph's Day side by side in Mu'a, “a first in Uvéa's history”: although the population remained very divided, this was the first time that the state-recognized King Takumasiva Aisake Patalione Kanimoa took part in a ceremony, while the other (unrecognized) lavelua, Ma'utamakia Vaimu'a Halagahu, was present.

== See also ==
- History of Wallis and Futuna
- Uvea
- Lavelua

== Bibliography ==
- Chave-Dartoen, Sophie (2017). Royauté, chefferie et monde socio-cosmique à Wallis ('Uvea) : Dynamiques sociales et pérennité des institutions [Royalty, chieftaincy and the socio-cosmic world of Wallis ('Uvea): Social dynamics and institutional durability] (in French). Marseille: Pacific-Credo Publications. p. 318. ISBN 9782953748567.
- Douaire‑Marsaudon, Françoise (2018). "Droit coutumier et loi républicaine dans une collectivité d'outre‑mer française (Wallis‑et‑Futuna)" [Customary law and republican law in a French overseas collectivity (Wallis and Futuna)]. Ethnologie française (in French). 169 (1): 81–92. doi:10.3917/ethn.181.0081.
- Pechberty, Dominique (2010). "Le Lavelua et sa succession à 'Uvea (île de Wallis)" [The Lavelua and its succession at 'Uvea (Wallis Island)]. Mondes océaniens : Études en l'honneur de Paul de Deckker [Mondes océaniens : Studies in honor of Paul de Deckker] (in French). L'Harmattan.
