= Royal Palace of Uvea =

Monument built for the residence of monarchs in Uvea, Wallis and Futuna

- Palais royal d'Uvea
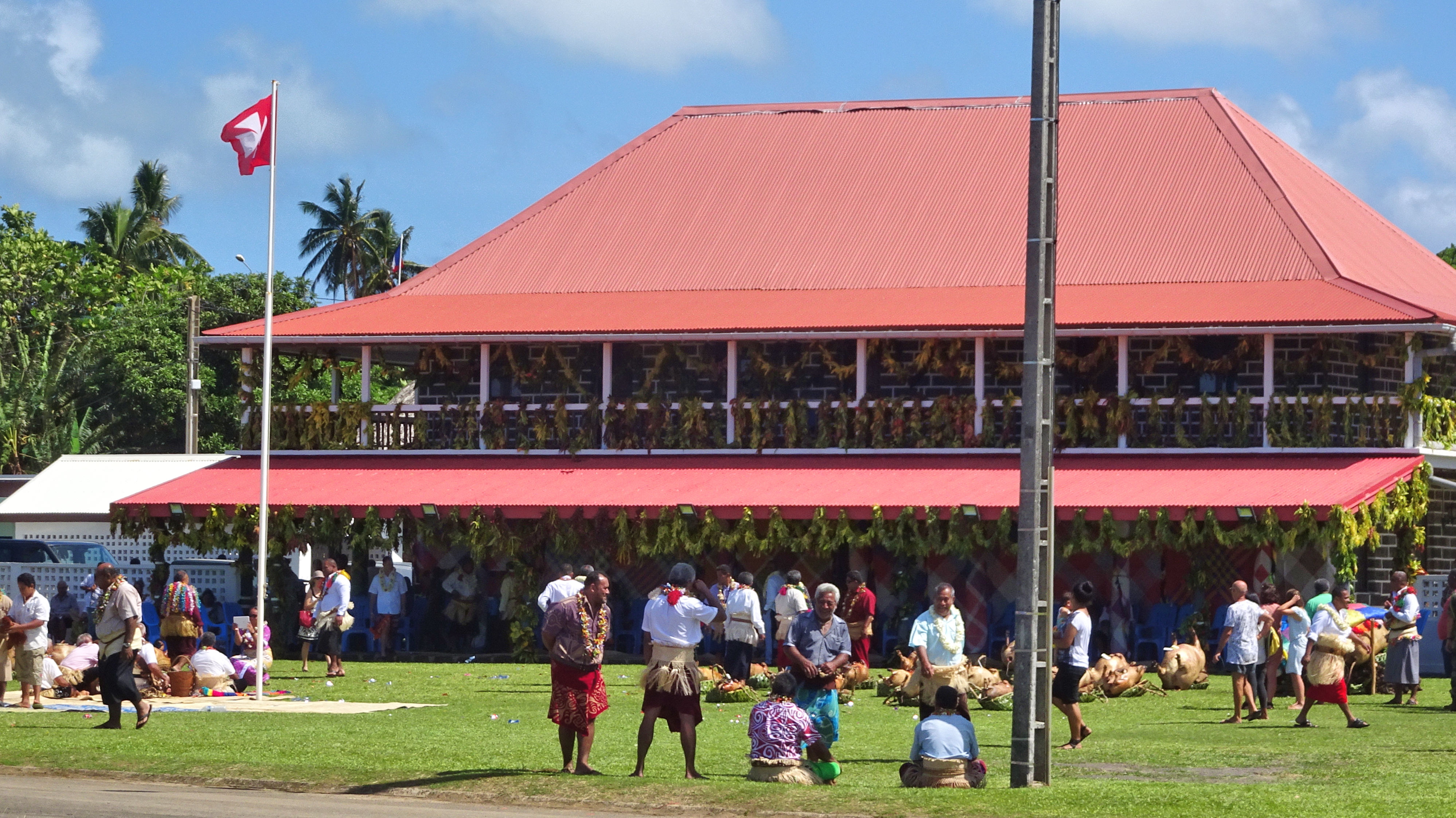
- Dancers in front of the royal palace during the territory festival on July 29, 2017.
- Interactive map of Royal Palace of Uvea
- Location: France
- Coordinates: 13°17′00″S 176°10′26″W
- Designer: Charles Bonneval
- Type: Palace
- Completion date: 1992

The Royal Palace of Uvea is the seat of the Lavelua, the customary king of Uvea, on the island of Wallis. It is located in Mata Utu, the capital of the overseas territory of Wallis and Futuna.

Built in 1876, it is a highly important political site, where most official and traditional ceremonies take place.

== Location ==
The palace stands in front of the Sagato Soane Square (French for Saint John), not far from the Notre-Dame-de-l'Assomption cathedral, in the heart of the village of Mata Utu. The land on which it is built is called Mala'evaka.

== Celebrations ==
The royal palace hosts most official and traditional ceremonies, such as the enthronement of a new Lavelua, the territorial feast day, the July 14th ceremony, and so on. During customary ceremonies such as the katoaga, the various territorial authorities (Lavelua and customary chiefs, bishop, senior administrator, etc.) are seated in front of the royal palace.

== History ==
=== Construction ===
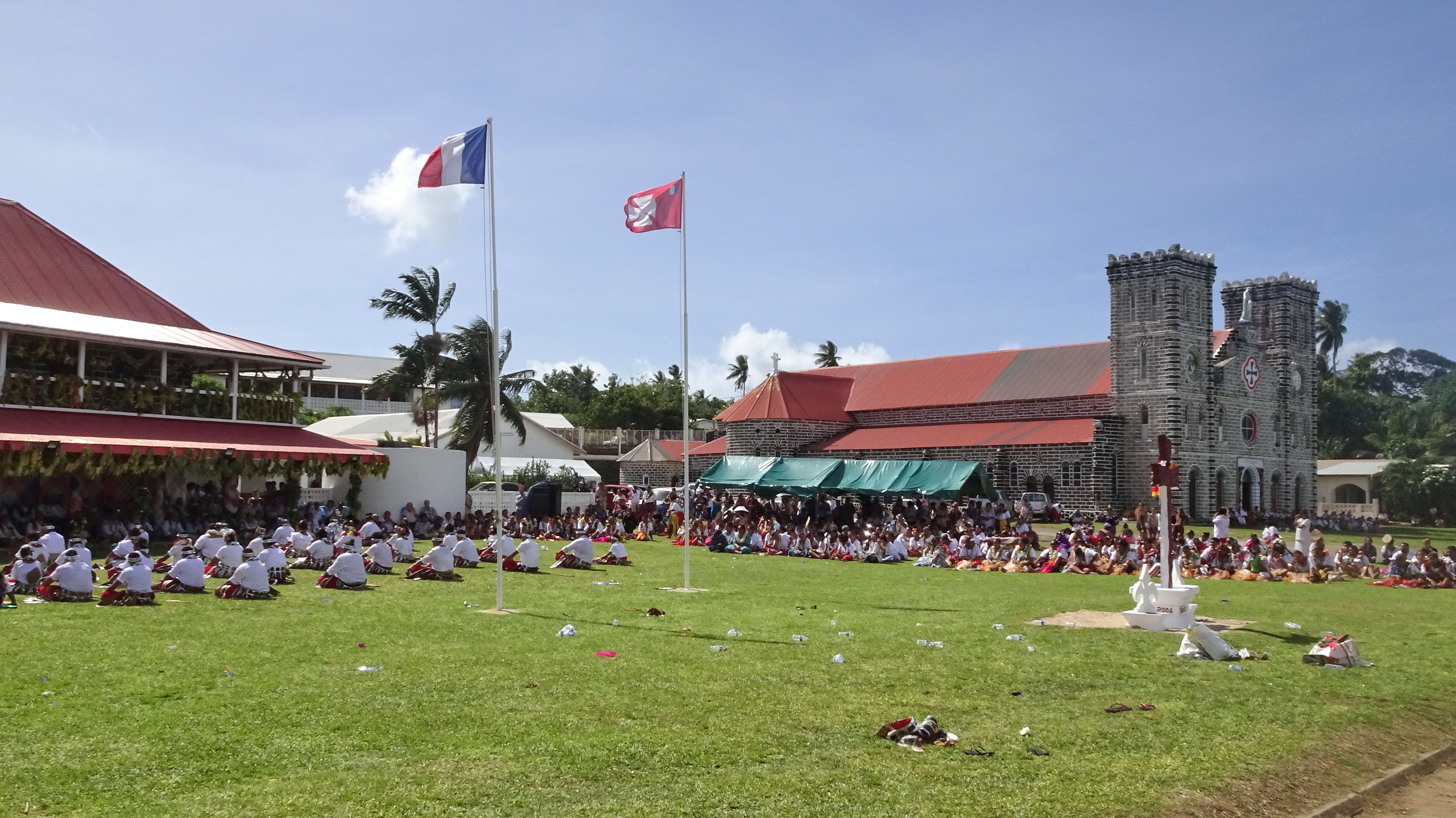
The Royal Palace (left) is very close to the Cathedral of Our Lady of the Assumption (right). In the middle, Sagato Soane Square.

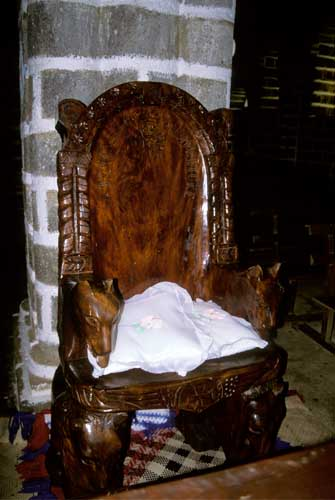
The Uvea royal throne in the Royal Palace.

Construction of the building began under the direction of French resident Jean-Joseph David and was completed during the reign of Amelia Tokagahau Aliki. Indeed, in 1876, Bishop Pierre Bataillon convinced the customary authorities to have the palace built thanks to village chores. The aim of the palace was:

To give the great chieftaincy of Wallis the appearance of Western-style royalty, so that the officers of the European navies would recognize the Lavelua [...] as heads of state capable of signing trade or alliance treaties.

The work was entrusted to architect Charles Bonneval, who drew inspiration from Tongan architecture to build this royal residence. This was the first time a house was built on stilts in Wallis. Built of stone, the palace has one floor and a sunroom.

The royal palace was rebuilt while Count Dodun de Kéroman was French resident (1892–1893).

Since its construction, the palace has undergone minor modernization.

=== Court cases ===
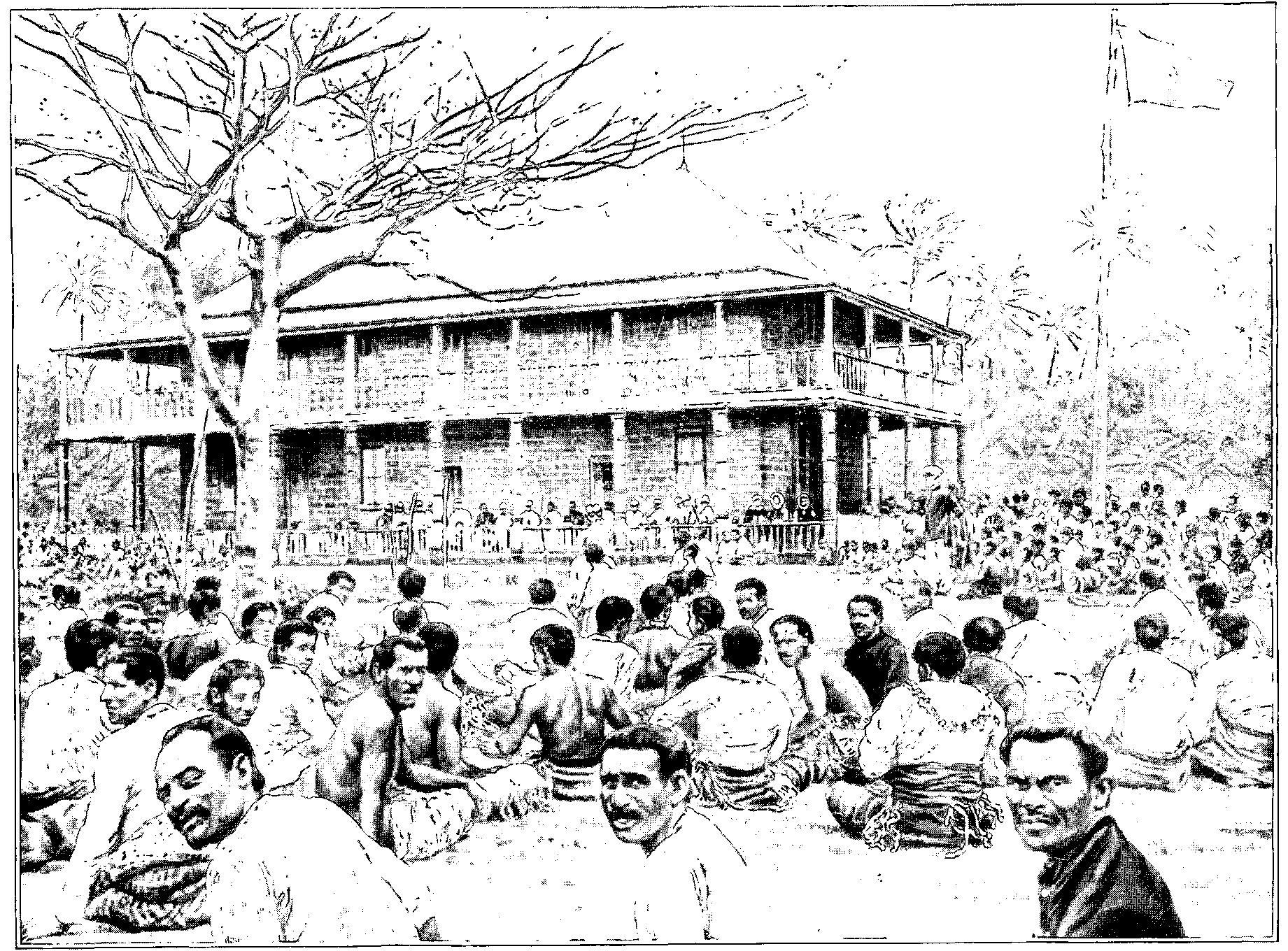
The Wallisian population gathered in front of the royal palace of Uvea in 1900.

On two occasions, Lavelua Tomasi Kulimoetoke II opened the doors of the royal palace to relatives convicted by the French justice system, so that they could escape from the gendarmes:

- In 1998, a legal-political affair implicated a high-ranking Wallisian woman, elected to the territorial assembly and close to Lavelua. She was accused of embezzlement and sentenced to two years imprisonment by the Nouméa court. The Lavelua played an important role in this affair, taking the woman's side entirely and opening the doors of the royal palace to her, where the gendarmes coming to get her did not dare enter.
- In June 2005, a customary crisis erupted when the grandson of the Lavelua (in power for 46 years) was convicted of manslaughter after killing a motorcyclist while driving drunk. The grandson took refuge in the Royal Palace of Uvea to protect himself from the police. This choice divides the aristocratic families, divided between customary support and loyalty to the French tutelary power. Two camps emerged: on the one hand, supporters of the king and, on the other, “renovators” who wanted to see custom evolve. For Frédéric Angleviel, the Kulimoetoke family, from which many members of the Grand Chieftaincy descended, refused to relinquish power after so many years.

== Gallery ==
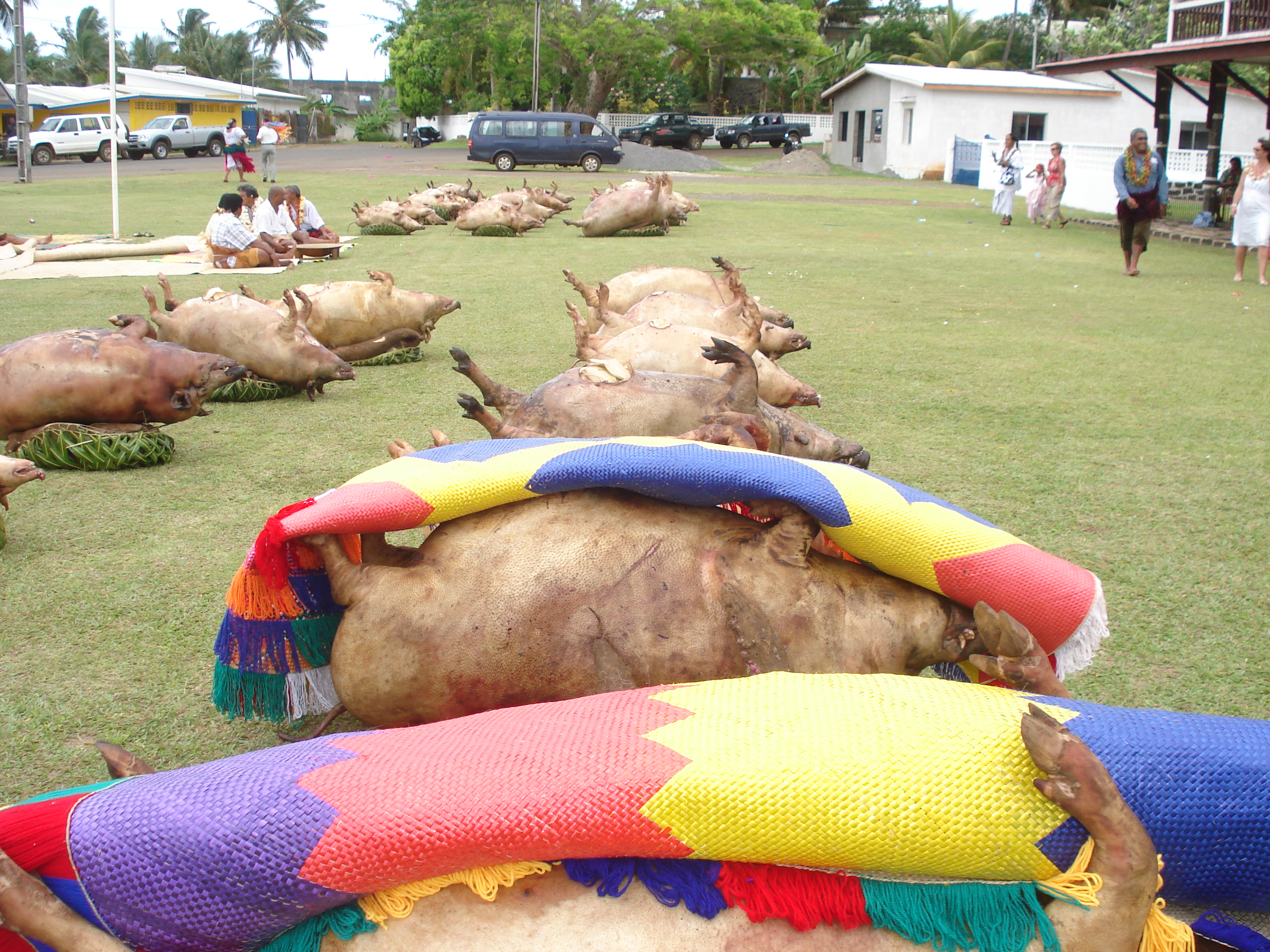
A katoaga with donated pigs in front of the royal palace (right).

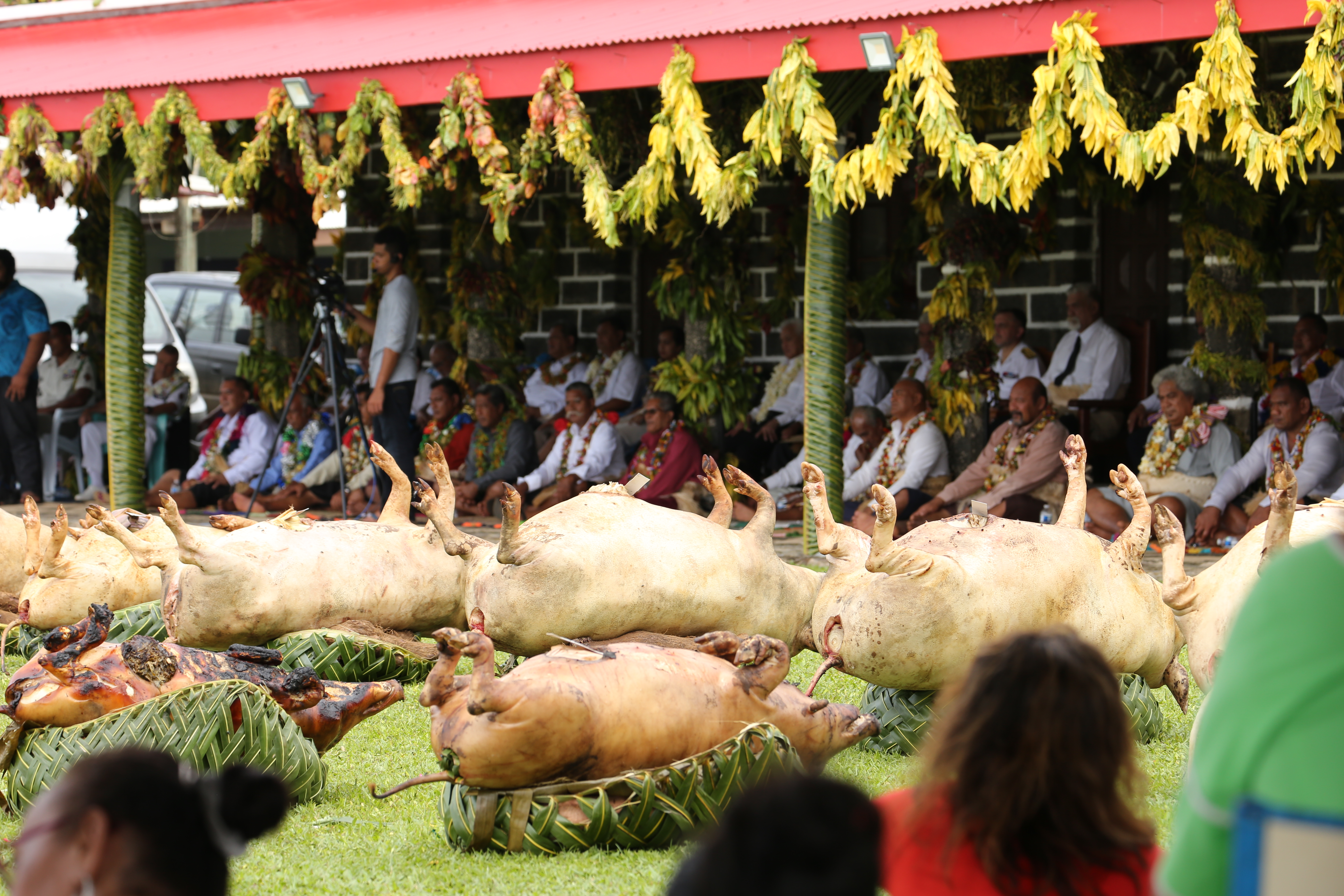
The palace decorated with garlands during a katoaga. The chieftaincy sits below in the background.

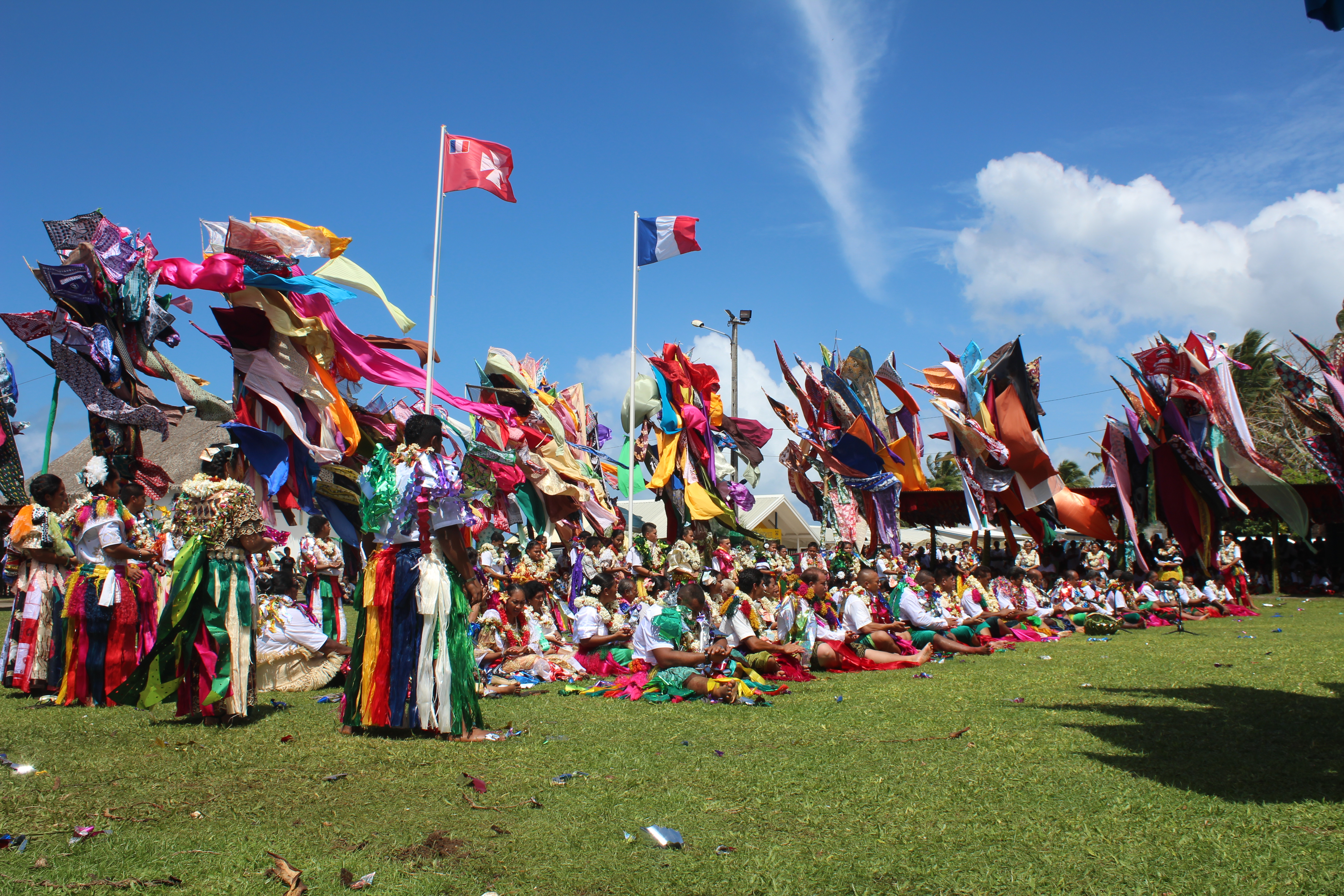
The Assumption feast in front of the palace with the flag of France and flag of Uvea in the background.

== See also ==
- Lavelua
- Uvea (Wallis and Futuna)
- Customary kingdoms of Wallis and Futuna
- Customary kings of Wallis and Futuna
- Protectorate of Wallis and Futuna
