= Faupala =

Faupala is a surname. Notable people with the surname include:

- David Faupala (born 1997), French footballer
- Kapeliele Faupala (born 1940), Wallis and Futuna monarch
