= Politics of Wallis and Futuna =

Politics of Wallis and Futuna takes place in a framework of a parliamentary representative democratic French overseas collectivity, whereby the President of the Territorial Assembly is the head of government, and of a multi-party system. Executive power is exercised by the government.

== Overview ==
The territory of Wallis and Futuna is divided into three traditional chiefdoms (royaumes coutumiers): Uvea, on the island of Wallis, Sigave, on the western part of the island of Futuna, and Alo, on the eastern part of the island of Futuna and the island of Alofi. Uvea is further subdivided into three districts: Hihifo, Hahake and Mu'a. The capital of the collectivity is Matâ'Utu on the island of Wallis, the most populated island. As an overseas collectivity of France, it is governed under the French constitution of September 28, 1958, uses both the French legal system and customary local laws ("coutume"), and suffrage is universal for those over 18 years of age. The French president is elected by popular vote for a five-year term; the high administrator is appointed by the French president on the advice of the French Ministry of the Interior; the presidents of the Territorial Government and the Territorial Assembly are elected by the members of the assembly.

== Executive branch ==
The head of state is the President of France as represented by Administrator Superior. The head of government is President of the Territorial Assembly Munipoese Muli’aka’aka. The Council of the Territory consists of three kings (kings of the three traditional chiefdoms) and three members appointed by the high administrator on the advice of the Territorial Assembly.

== Legislative branch ==
The legislative branch consists of the unicameral Territorial Assembly or Assemblée territoriale of 20 seats; the members are elected by popular vote to serve five-year terms. Wallis and Futuna elects one senator to the French Senate and one deputy to the French National Assembly. The next election is scheduled for 20 March 2022.

With regard to the legal profession, according to a 2017 source, "there are no private lawyers, notaries, or bailiffs in the territory of Wallis and Futuna."

== Judicial branch ==
Justice is generally administered under French law by a tribunal of first instance in Matâ'Utu, but the three traditional chiefdoms administer justice according to customary law ("coutume", only for non criminal cases). The court of appeal is in Nouméa, New Caledonia.

== International relations ==
Wallis and Futuna participates in the Franc Zone, and is a member of the Pacific Community (SPC).

== See also ==
- Katoaga
- Justice in Wallis and Futuna
