= Patalione Kanimoa =

- 52nd Lavelua of Wallis (Uvea)
- Reign: April 17, 2016 – present
- Coronation: April 17, 2016
- Predecessor: Kapeliele Faupala; Council of Ministers
- House: Takumasiva Dynasty

Patalione Kanimoa is a Wallisian politician from Wallis and Futuna, a French overseas collectivity in the South Pacific. He was President of the Territorial Assembly in the French government of the Wallis and Futuna. He was nominated by the French president Jacques Chirac on 18 January 2005.

On 17 April 2016, he was chosen by a rival chief council to be the new king of 'Uvea, even though the island already had a king, Tominiko Halagahu, who was installed the previous day. After almost two months of dispute, Kanimoa was officially confirmed by the administrator-superior of the French Republic as king on 3 June 2016, and has been reigning over the kingdom ever since.
