= Xavier de Fürst =

French prefect

Xavier de Fürst (born 1948) is a French prefect. He was the high administrator of the French government in the Wallis and Futuna islands in the South Pacific. He accepted the role and became administrator of the islands on 18 January 2005. He was succeeded by Richard Didier.

On 24 May 2005, de Fürst stopped paying King of Wallis Tomasi Kulimoetoke II his €5,500 payment made by France because he refused to hand over his grandson, guilty of killing a person while drunk driving, to the police.
