= Katoaga =

French traditional celebration

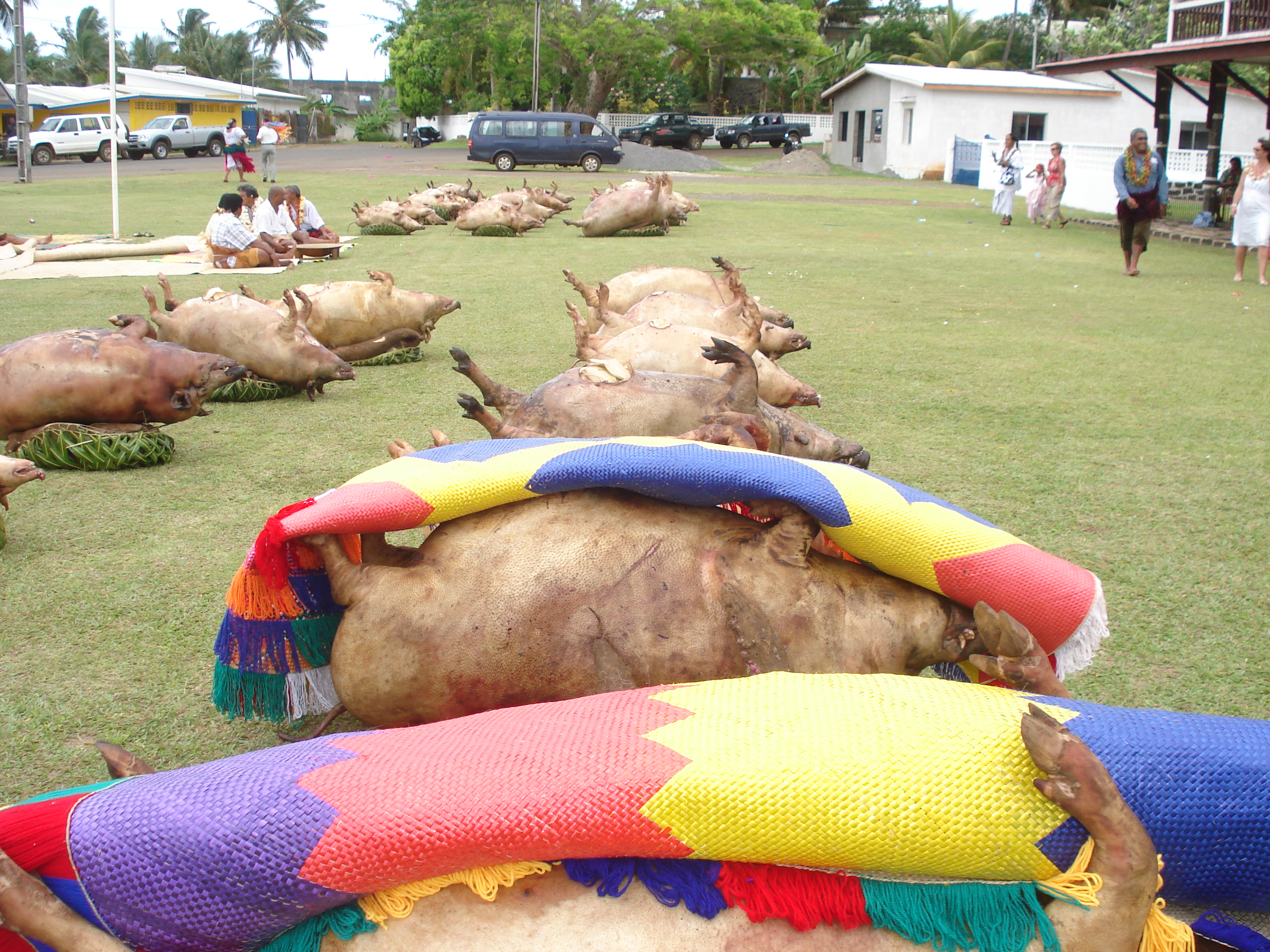
Pigs and banigs lined up in front of the Uvea royal palace in Matā'utu during a katoaga in Wallis in 2008

The kātoaga is a customary festival in Wallis and Futuna, a French overseas collectivity in Oceania with a Polynesian culture. During this ceremony, goods are exchanged, such as pigs, baskets of vegetables (yams and taro), banigs, tapa or envelopes filled with banknotes. It takes place on the occasion of religious festivals, political events (enthronement of a sovereign, national holiday...) or private events (wedding, communion, funeral). Of ancient origin and present in many Polynesian societies, the katoaga obeys a strict ritual and protocol that has changed little since the Christianization of Wallis and Futuna in the 19th century. It begins with a Catholic mass, is followed by a meal, a kava ceremony and dances performed by the villagers, before the food brought by the inhabitants is redistributed to the dignitaries and the population, each gift being allocated according to the rank of the person for whom it is intended. Speeches, poems and stories from the oral tradition are recited by the participating dignitaries. These major customary celebrations mobilize several villages or districts, and require several weeks or even months of preparation.

A katoaga filmed in Wallis in 2020 in the village of Halalo: mass at the chapel of Sainte-Jeanne-d'Arc, setting out food (baskets, pigs, banigs, etc.) and determining their recipient, kava ceremony, speeches.

The katoaga is a customary obligation that concerns the entire population. It follows a logic of gift and counter-gift comparable to that of the potlatch, where the goods offered confer prestige on the giver and oblige the recipient to give in return, without any use or monetary value. The recipient's social status is determined by the quality and quantity of the goods offered. The food and objects donated during a katoaga are produced by those who bring them, according to a gendered logic (pigs and yams for men, banigs for women), but more and more salaried Wallisians and Futunians are buying them from producers, leading to an inflation of donations and indebtedness to be able to offer goods commensurate with their rank. Nevertheless, this contributes to a redistribution of monetary wealth among the population.

The katoaga showcases the social order of Wallisian and Futunansociety, displaying each person's place in the hierarchy, but also constitutes a political arena, with the authority of customary chiefs measured in their ability to bring together large numbers of people to offer wealth, which is then redistributed. This ceremony also consecrates the role of customary kings as guarantors of the smooth running of society, acting as intermediaries between the world of the living, that of the ancestors and God.

== Etymology ==
The word kātoaga, often spelled katoaga, is formed from two Wallisian terms: kātoa "to gather together" and 'aga "the place where the action takes place". It can refer to an entire customary ceremony or, strictly speaking, to the distribution of food. The term is also used in Futunan; linguist Claire Moyse-Faurie defines it as "traditional ceremony of food distribution in the village square".

== History ==
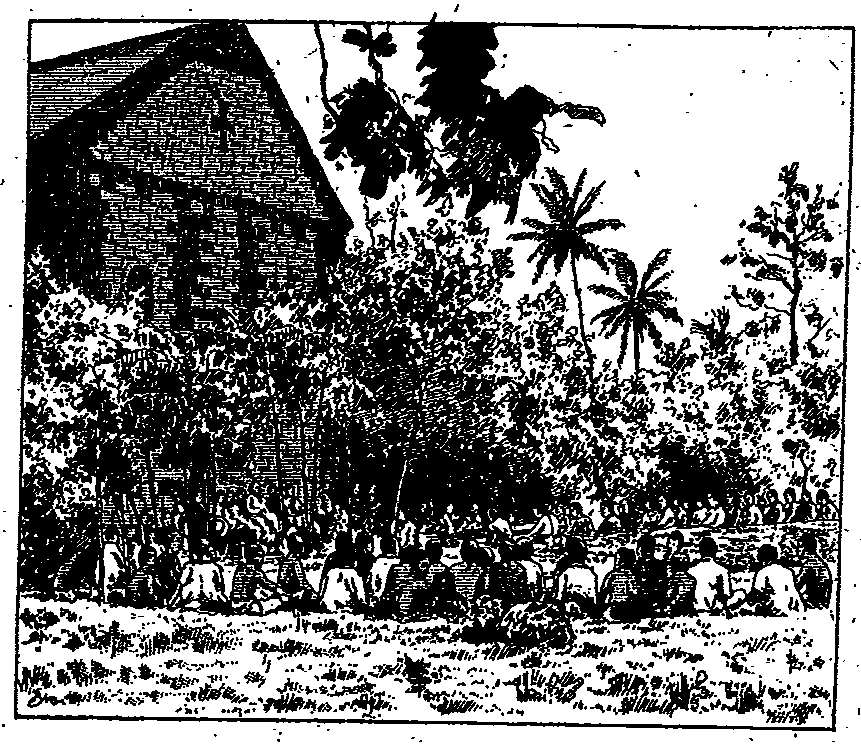
Engraving depicting a katoaga in front of the church in Lano, Wallis, circa late 1880s.

Throughout the history of Wallis and Futuna, the katoaga ceremony has endured, even after the Christianization of the territory in the 19th century. Anthropologist Dominique Pechberty points out that "this is not folklore for tourists, nor is it the reclaiming of a cultural heritage to regain a lost identity".

The origin of katoaga is not specified, but it is part of the history of Polynesian festivals. The first known katoaga in Western sources were described by Dutch navigators Willem Schouten and Jacob Le Maire when they visited Futuna in 1616. Similar ceremonies were observed in Tonga (where they were called katoanga) and the Marquesas Islands in the 18th century. They are also found in Rotuma under the name kato'aga and are still practiced in 20th-century Tonga. In Polynesian societies of this period, "the tribal chief centralizes the food supply and then redistributes it according to the existing hierarchy ". In Wallis, the organization of the katoaga was influenced by Tonga. Before Christianization, these festivals "were held [...] in honor of the anniversary of the death of a religious dignitary, or to celebrate the first yam harvest, or in honor of a chief's son, etc.".

In Futuna, the katoaga is often organized during the enthronement ceremony of a customary king. Before Christianization, this enthronement often took place just before a war between the kingdoms of Alo and Sigave; the katoaga then constituted "the people's thanks to the sovereign for the battle he was about to wage". In Futunian, the katoaga was known as gasue taumafa o le launiu, the "meal of consecration of the launiu", the coconut palm that symbolizes the title of customary king. With Christianization, the term taumafa became associated with Christ's Last Supper: for anthropologist Adriano Favole, the same symbolism of the meal preceding a sacrifice is found here.

For archaeologist Anne di Piazza, the katoaga played a role in the organization of agriculture in Futuna: the emergence of irrigated tarodières enabled abundant tuber production. As a result, "high yields [...] probably reinforced the competitive aspect" of the katoaga.

== The ceremony ==
=== Occasions for celebration ===
Katoaga may be organized for a variety of occasions: a religious festival, such as the feast of the patron saint of a parish (St. Michael in Ha'afuasia, St. John the Baptist in Vailala, St. Peter Chanel in Halalo, the Sacred Heart in Tepa); a secular festival, such as the national holiday on 14 July the territorial holiday on 29 July or the enthro nement of a political figure; or a private occasion, such as a wedding, First Communion or death. These ceremonies are numerous and punctuate the life of the population. The katoaga is part of a series of celebrations that bring families together and during which goods are exchanged.

In Futuna, a katoaga is organized for the enthronement of a customary king. Katoagas are held less frequently than the kava ceremony (which takes place at every assembly of nobles, or aliki). Indeed, "the katoaga is a long and elaborate redistributive rite that involves the gathering of large quantities of wealth (...) and is linked to the state of the harvest and the existence of a sufficient number of pigs".

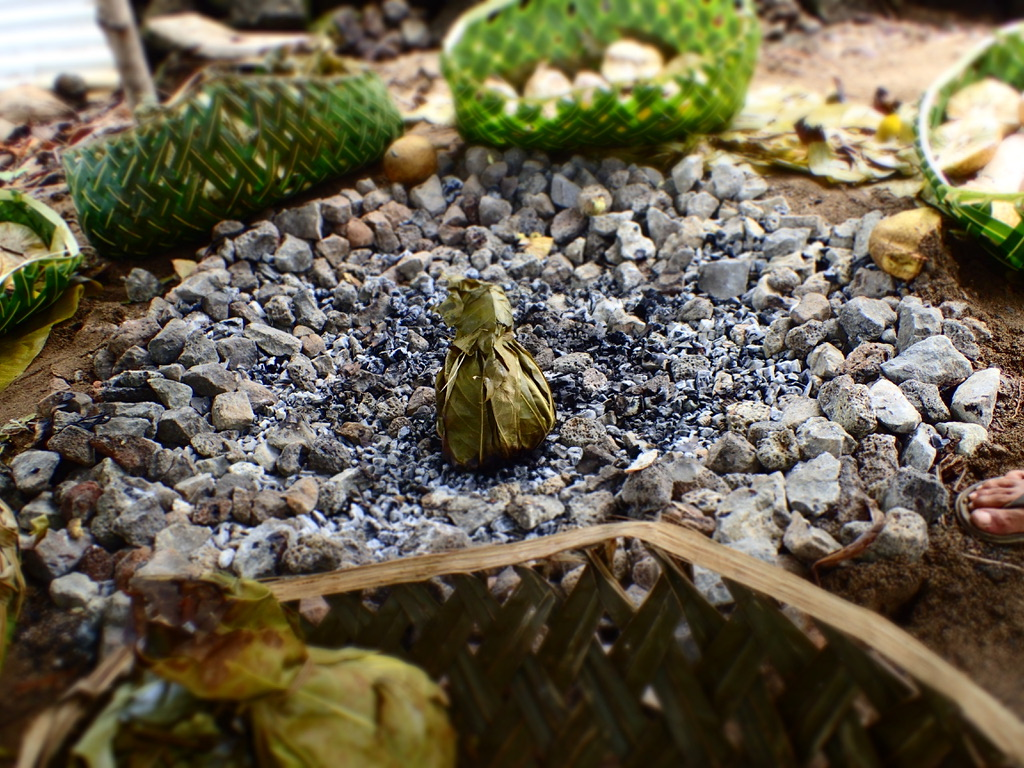
The food is cooked in a traditional oven ('umu), made by heating volcanic stones and then covering the food with earth, wrapped in banana leaves

=== Organization ===
A katoaga requires a great deal of organization, and is generally prepared several weeks or even months in advance. It often mobilizes several villages, districts, or even the entire population of a customary kingdom. The food offered requires planning throughout the year: rearing pigs, planting vegetables (yams, alocasia macrorrhizos). Songs and dances are rehearsed by the different villages; some may be created for the occasion.

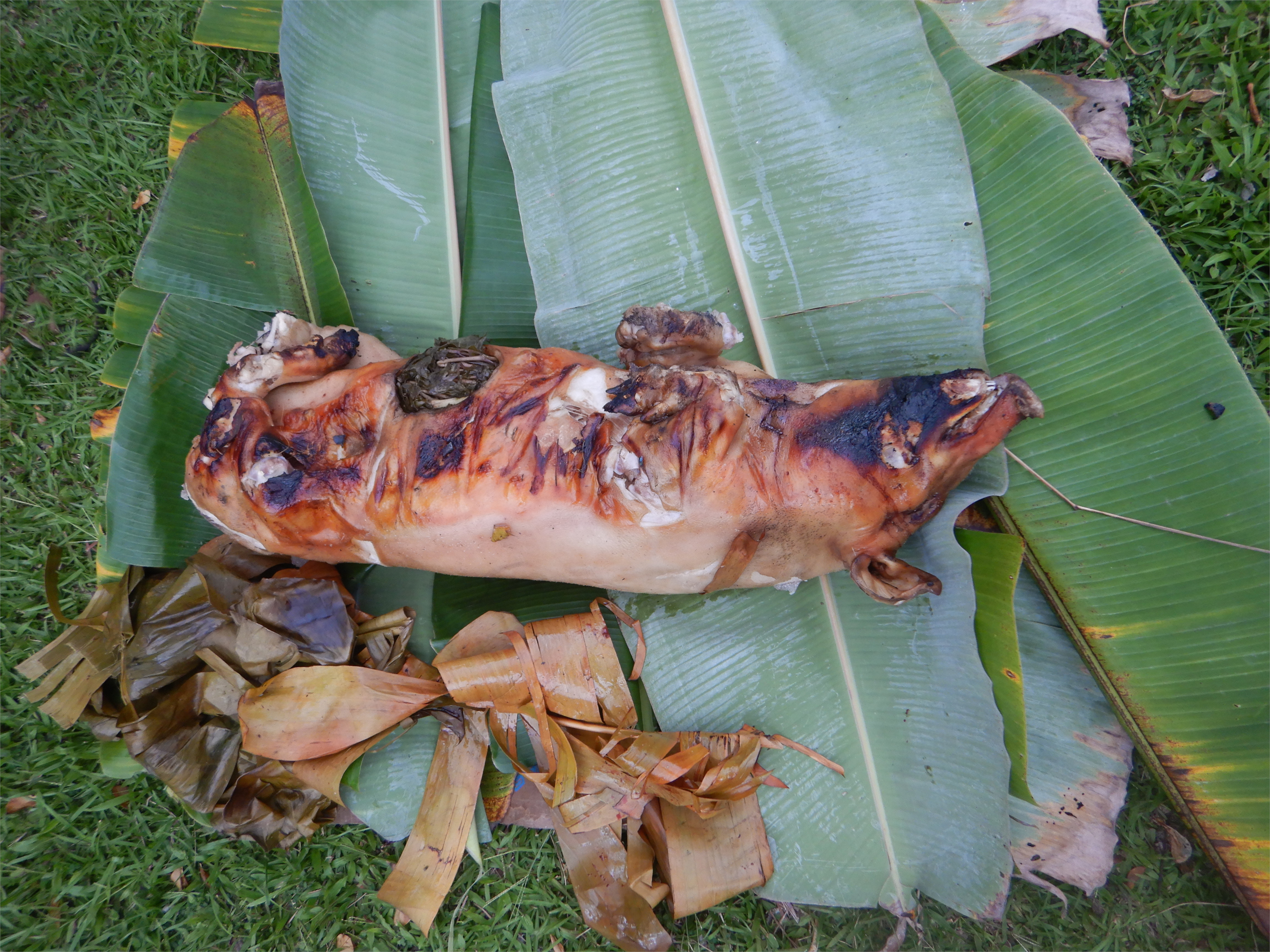
The pigs are eviscerated and grilled before being put on display

The organization of a katoaga is set by the customary ministers, the district chief (in Wallis) and the village chiefs at a council (fono). At these councils, the amount and type of food requested is discussed. Decisions are then passed on to representatives of the various neighborhoods in each village, as well as to representatives of the young men (takitaki tagata) and women (takitaki fafine).

There are several types of katoaga in Futuna, depending on the amount of food required: tagata-fatogia, where each adult male who performs collective work for the village chief must bring a basket of food and a pig, and fai'umu, where the number of traditional ovens in each household (kaiga) is used as a reference. There are usually more men than ovens: the tagata-fatogia is thus a large-scale katoaga. The status of fatogia, which Adriano Favole translates as "citizenship", confers rights and duties within a village, including the right to participate in the katoaga.

On the eve of a katoaga, the villagers are intensely busy: pigs are shot, eviscerated and cooked in buried ovens by the men, while the women make necklaces of tiaré and hibiscus flowers. Baskets of food and pigs are transported by car to the ceremony site.

=== Proceedings ===
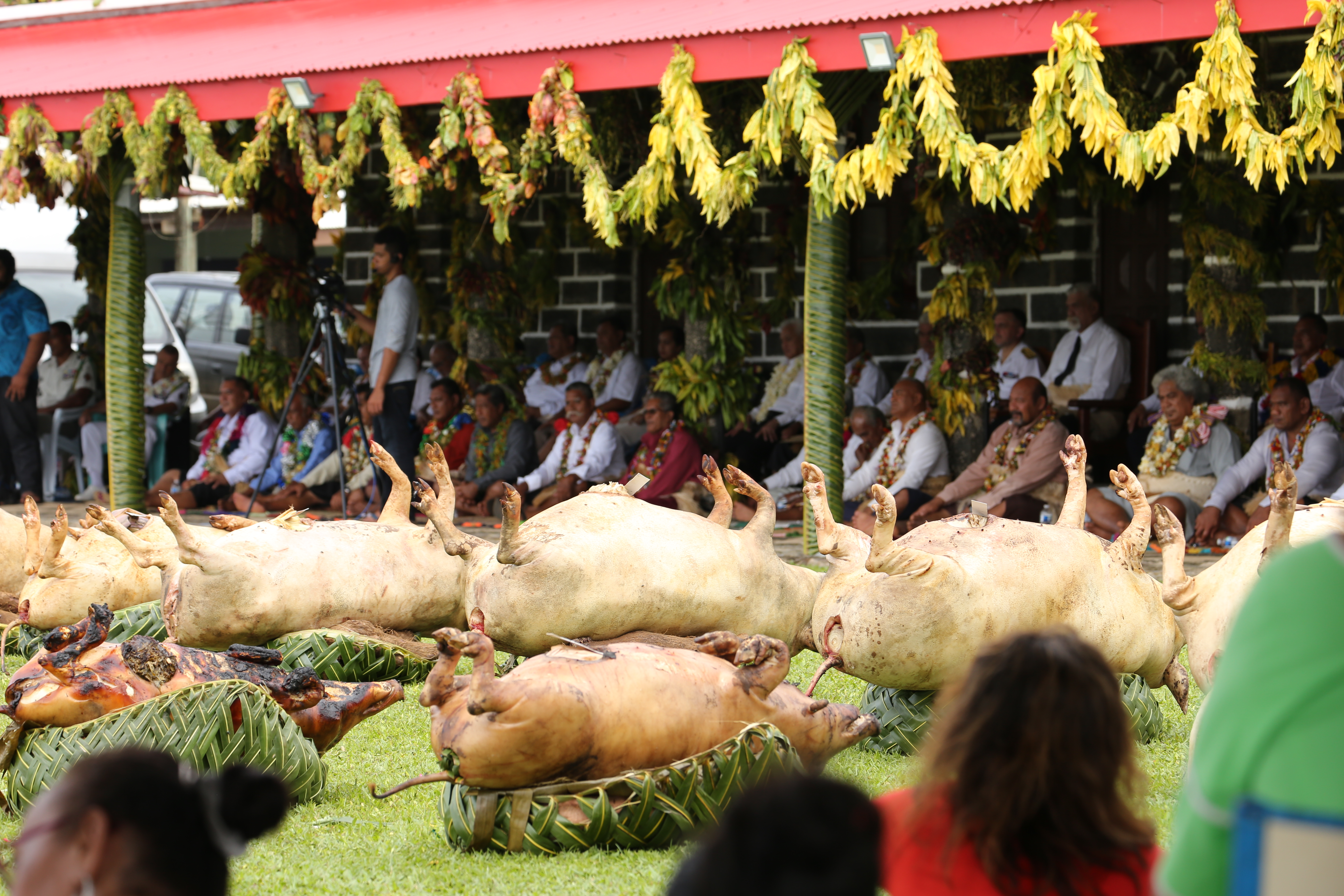
Offerings (baskets of vegetables and grilled pigs) placed on the mala'e, in front of seated dignitaries (here, the katoaga takes place in front of the royal palace in Mata Utu on Territory Day, 29 July 2019)

In Wallis, the katoaga begins with an early-morning mass, followed by an "apéritif" (a meal offered for dignitaries), a kava ceremony, then dances and finally the distribution of food. In Futuna, the two essential components of a katoaga are the distribution of kava among the chiefs and the distribution of food.

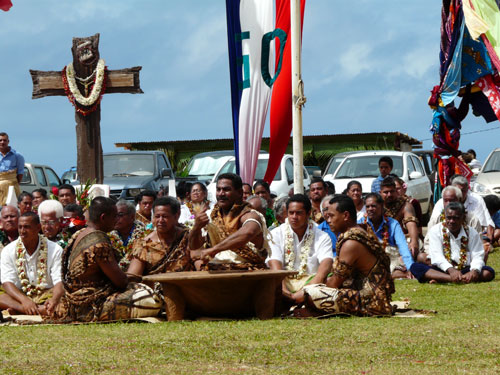
Wallis kava ceremony in front of the royal palace (6 February 2016). It follows a highly codified protocol.

Before leaving mass, the customary district and village chiefs place the offerings ('umu) in the central square (mala'e) right next to the church, and determine to whom they will be distributed, according to their size (the larger the pig, the higher the rank of the recipient). In Futuna, this important responsibility is devolved to an aliki (nobleman, chief), the Tu'i Sa'akafu, whose sole role is among the chieftains.

The dignitaries (in protocol order: Lavelua, customary ministers, bishop, senior administrator, deputy, senator, elected territorial representatives, religious men and women, education representatives, administrative department heads, village chiefs) are generally seated on a terrace sheltered from the wind and sun. Opposite them, the representatives of the noble families who offer the kava are seated on a mat. The dances also take place here. The goods on offer are placed behind the dancers, and spectators from the various villages are seated to one side. The donated foodstuffs are displayed in the central square (mala'e), so that the gifts can be seen to their best advantage.

After mass, the kava ceremony takes place, which is of major importance in the custom, especially if it's a royal kava. The ceremony follows a strict protocol, with well-defined roles for each actor. In Wallis, the crushed kava root is presented to the Lavelua, then the kava is stirred and finally filtered. The liquid is collected in a container called a tano'a. It is then distributed in coconut cups to the various notables present. The order of distribution of the kava cups is determined by the rank of each dignitary, alternating between nobles ('aliki) and commoners (tu'a). The master of ceremonies is responsible for announcing in turn the persons to whom the kava is to be distributed; once called, they clap their hands three times and receive a cup. The Lavelua always has the first cup, and the Prefect the last. This ceremonial is punctuated by a codified speech exchanged between the different actors at each stage of the ceremony. No talking, smoking or moving is allowed, and all observers are seated: "this is a sacred moment that commands respect". Guards are in charge of enforcing these instructions.

In Futuna, the kava ceremony is a little different. Women are excluded from the ceremony, but can still observe it, whereas on Wallis, "women of a certain rank have the right to take part in the ceremony too".

In Futuna, katoaga are an opportunity to recite poems and songs from the oral tradition, and they form the heart of the ceremony. Some, like the miō, are spoken just before the distribution of kava to a customary king. These stories (fakamatala) and tales (fagana) recount the deeds and actions of warriors recounting the history of Futuna, "it is within these very texts that title-bearing chiefs (aliki) find the primary source of their authority and prestige". Another speech, the fakamisimisi, is proclaimed by a chief from outside the village: he celebrates the work carried out by the Futunans and "[thanks] the chiefs and the people for the abundance and beauty of the products on display".

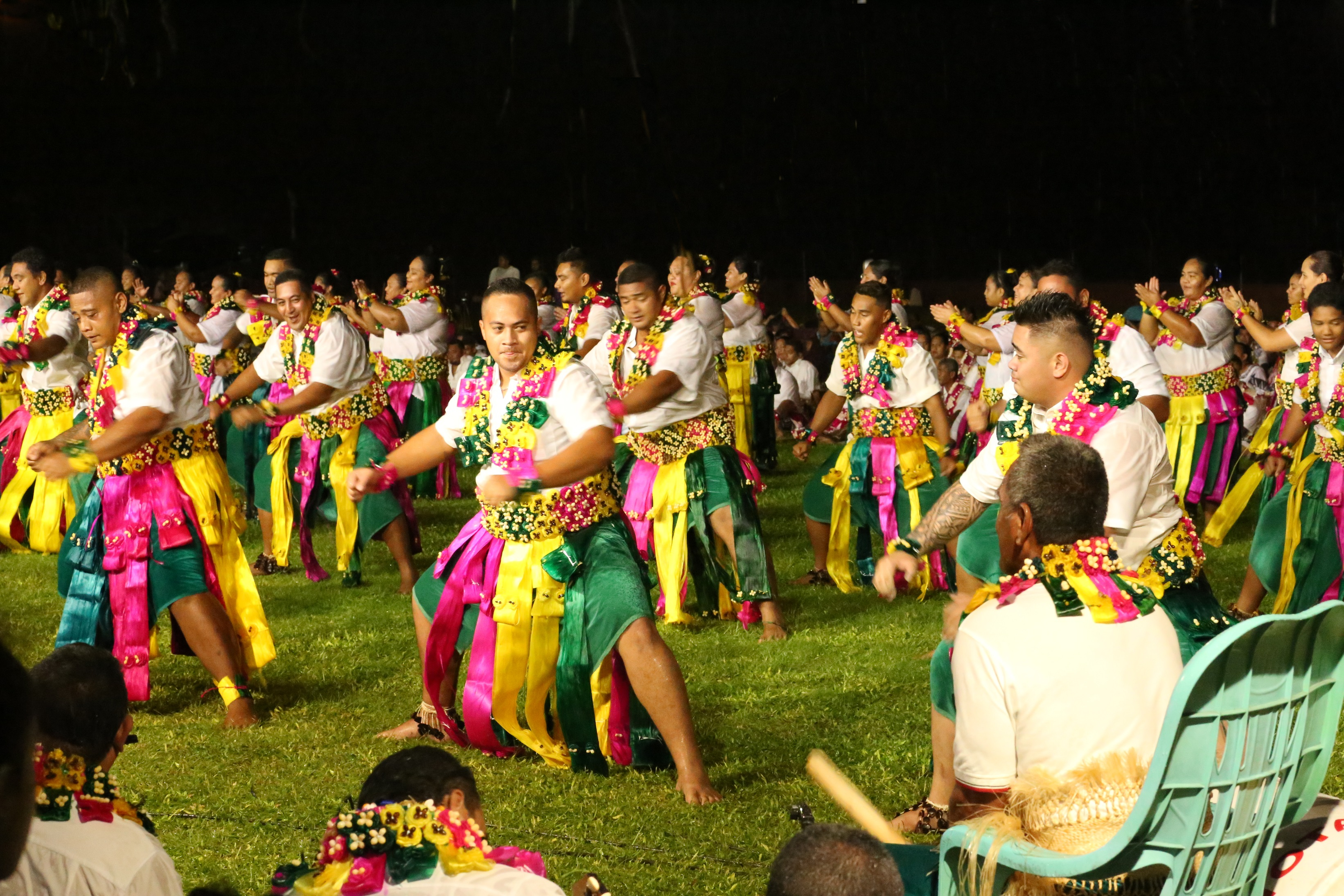
Dance competition for the French national holiday in 2019 in Wallis

After the kava, groups of dancers from different villages or parishes perform for the dignitaries. The katoaga can be the occasion for dance competitions, which can last for several hours. Spectators may reward dancers by slipping Pacific franc bills into their hair or clothing. According to Dominique Pechberty, this practice dates back to the American presence in Wallis from 1942 to 1946 and the monetarization of the Wallisian economy. However, only bills slipped into clothing can be recovered by the dancer; money placed in headdresses is collected and redistributed equitably among all participants after the ceremony. The songs that accompany the dances are generally created for the occasion and recall oral tradition, history or, on the contrary, everyday life.

A speech introduces the offerings, then the shares are announced aloud and collected by the recipient. The order of distribution is "rigorously descending", with the largest pigs and baskets reserved for the highest-ranking dignitaries.

In Wallis, the feast comes to an end around midday, and the various participants return home.

== Economic aspects ==
=== Goods offered ===
Food and goods offered during three katoaga in Wallis in 1988–8922:
150th anniversary of the arrival of the Marist Fathers on 20 November 1988:
- 32 large pigs
- 74 medium and small pigs
- 76 baskets of cooked tubers
- 12 stacks of kape
Wedding of the grandson of King Tomasi Kulimoetoke II with the daughter of Senator Soséfo Makapé Papilio on 23 December 1988 (offerings from the King to the Senator)
- 10 large pigs
- 56 medium and small pigs
- 56 baskets of tubers
Enthronement of deputy Kamilo Gata (17 January 1989) :
- 17 large pigs
- 48 medium and small pigs
- 2 piles of taro and yams

A total of 14 tons of meat.

During a katoaga, the main goods offered are baskets of vegetables (yams, alocasia macrorrhizos) and fruit (bananas), on which are placed grilled pigs, which are then covered with a banig at containing a bark cloth (tapa). The pigs are eviscerated and not cooked (they are usually annealed afterwards before being eaten). In Futuna, they are covered with turmeric to preserve them better. Pigs are stuffed with breadfruit leaves to make them look bigger. Kava plants are also brought in.

These goods, called koloa in Wallisian, are gendered: the pigs and yams are brought by the men, the banigs prepared by the women. Handicrafts made by women are brought in for major festivals. Pig farming is an important marker of masculinity, and most Wallisians keep pigs. "Each family gives a pig of varying size, depending on the title of the head of the family, his generosity and his means.

Since the 1960s, Western products such as bags of rice, tins of meat, cigarettes and bottles of Coca-Cola have also been on display, along with envelopes stuffed with money. They reflect the population's changing consumption patterns. These goods are particularly in demand from salaried workers, who can afford to buy them.

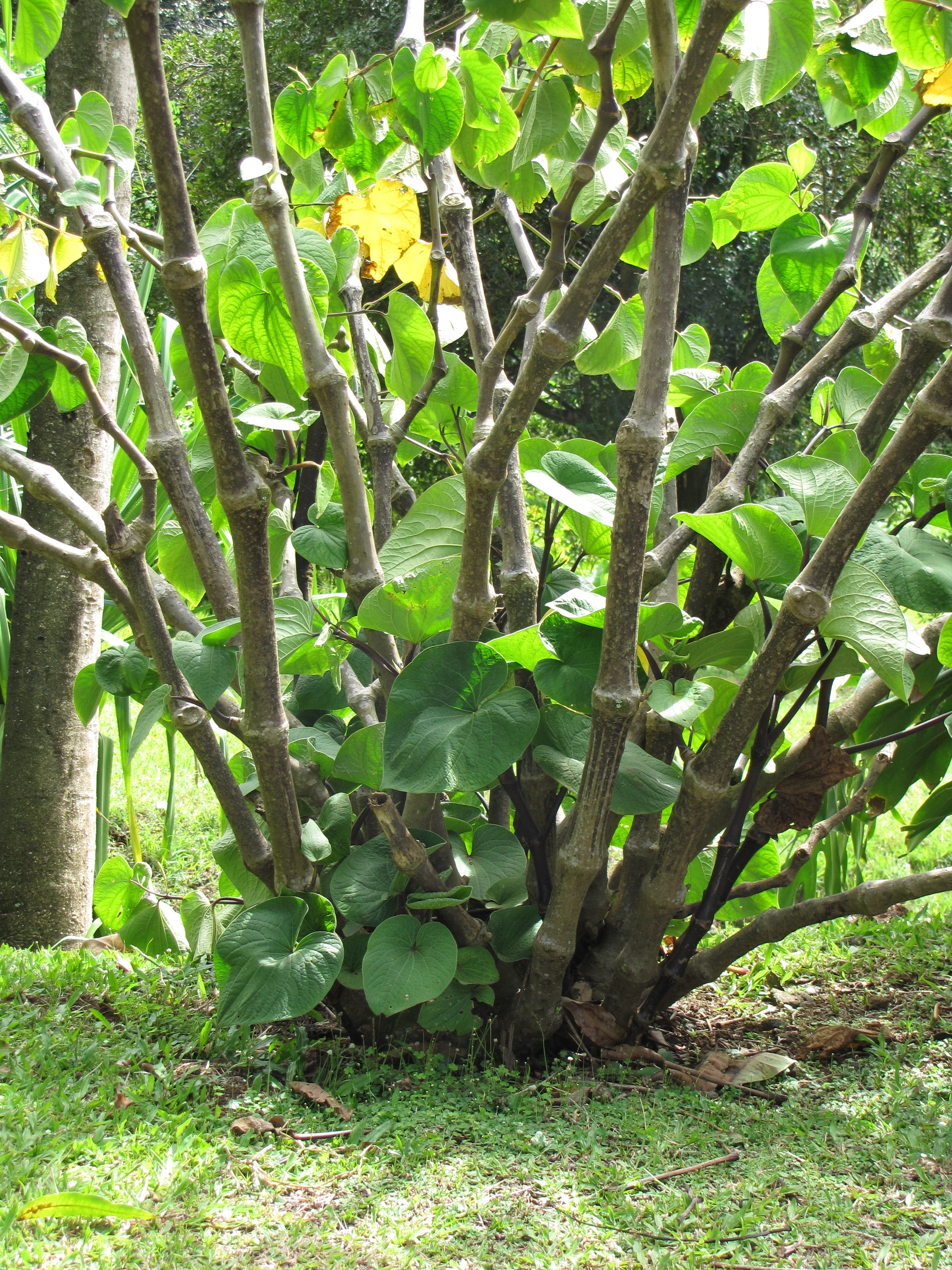
In Futuna, kava plants (piper methysticum) are offered at the katoaga

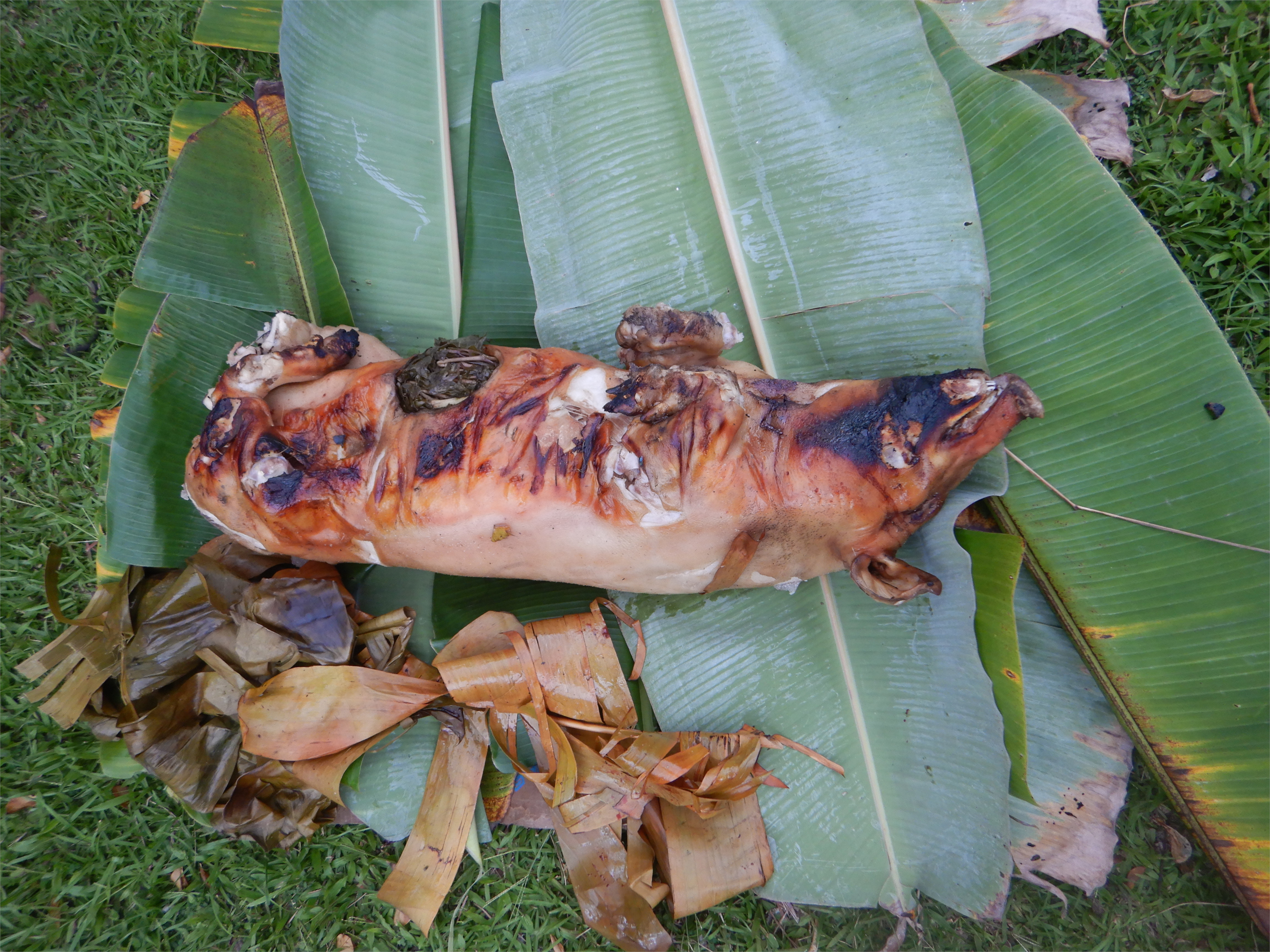
After kava, pigs are the most important gifts in the hierarchy.

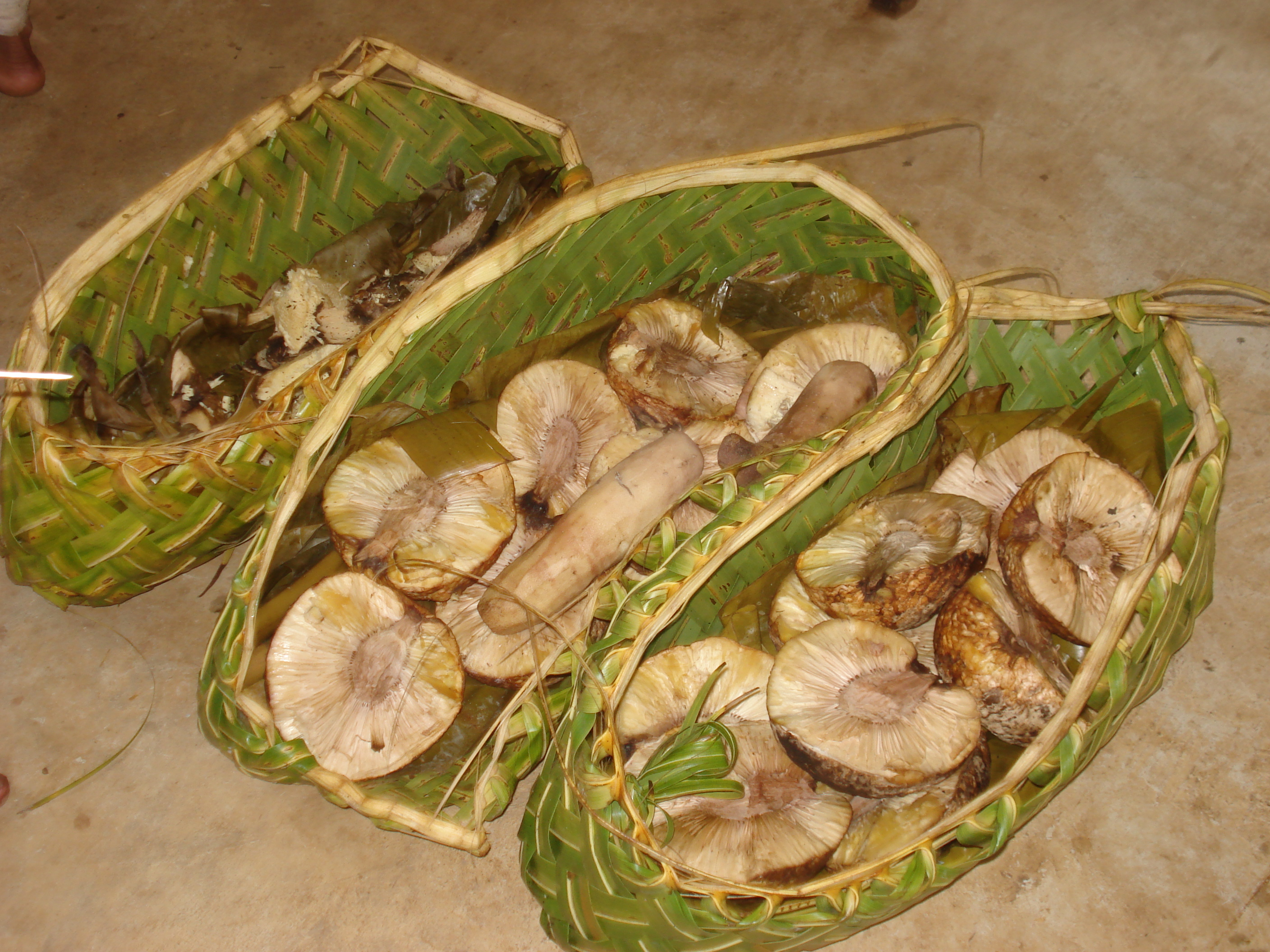
Vegetable baskets containing breadfruit and yams

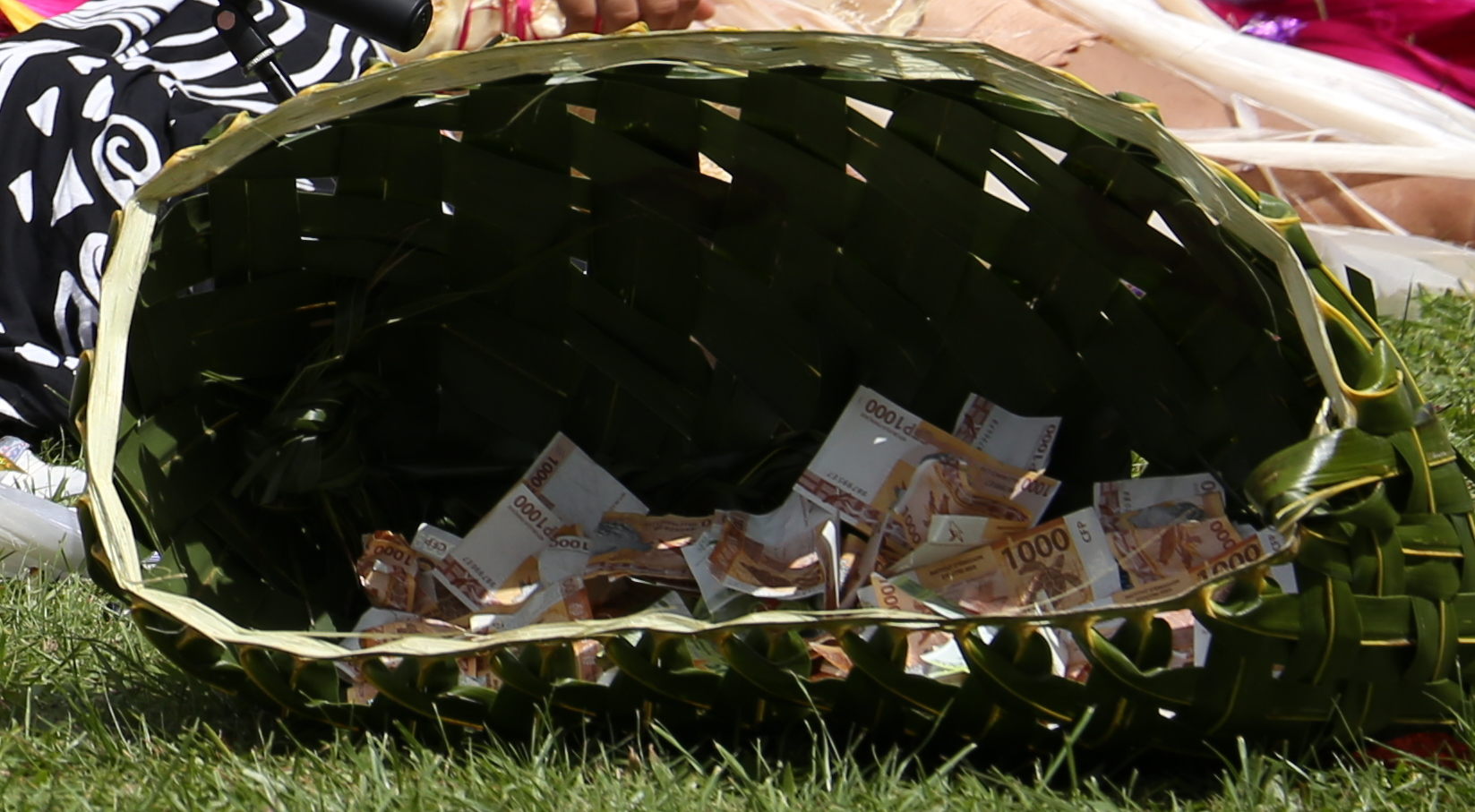
Monetary donations are also made

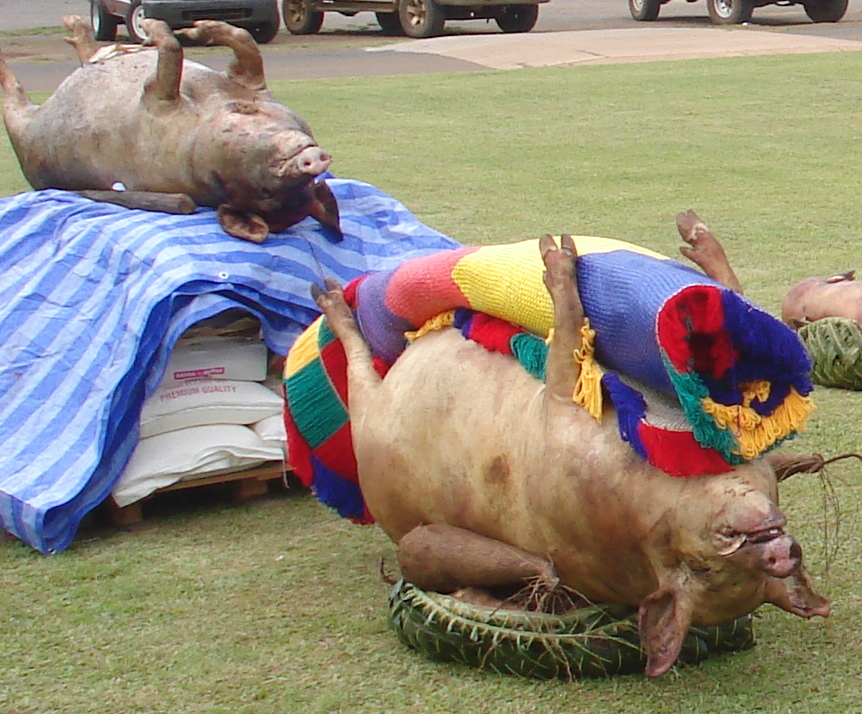
In addition to vegetables, pigs and banigs, imported products (flour, rice, etc.) are also offered.

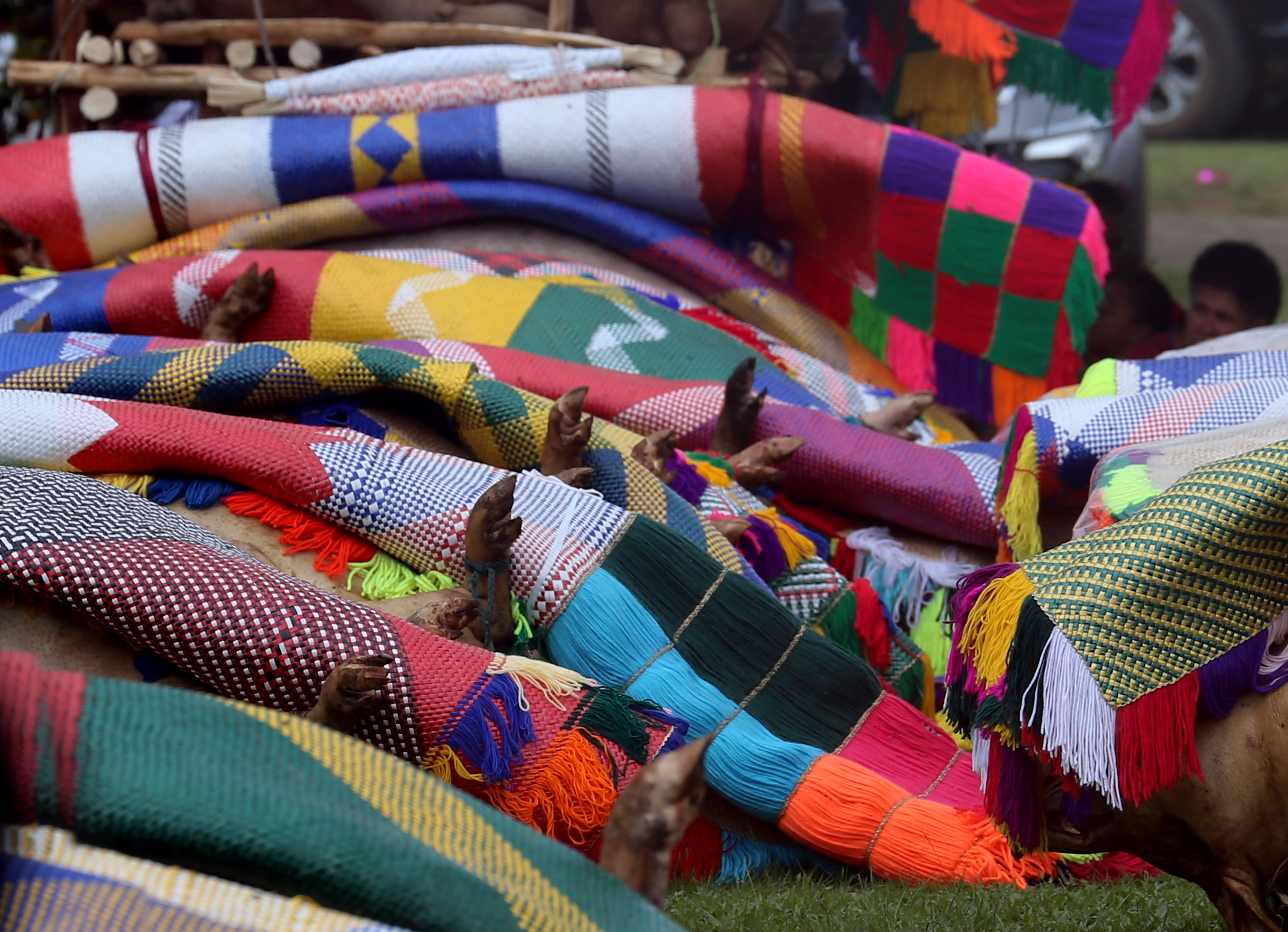
Banigs are brought in by women

=== Value of goods ===
Not all goods have the same symbolic value. Feet of kava are hierarchically the most important, ahead of pigs. Next come food baskets, containing yams, taro and bananas. "Only plants with a certain status are [...] exposed. The quality of the tuber or fruit takes precedence over the number". The symbolic scale continues with Western goods. The products of women's labor (banigs, perfumed oils, turmeric) come last in the hierarchy. The hierarchy of goods presented overlaps with the social hierarchy.

The value of the goods exchanged does not follow a monetary logic: while it is possible to buy banigs or pigs before a katoaga, "in no case can an equivalent sum of money replace them on the day of distribution". Nor is their value measured by how they are used: "most pigs, whose meat turns in the sun, end up in the dump", and when the food is consumed and the banigs used as bedding, they lose all value. These goods are above all expressions of social relationships between givers and receivers, in contrast to the Western concept of the individual. Anne di Piazza describes the production of taros and yams intended as gifts as "production for social and ritual purposes".

In general, villagers get back less food than they have given, with the largest shares going to authorities, often from outside the village. Goods continue to circulate within family groups (kaiga) and are redistributed (unless they have been eaten at a collective meal).

=== Production and sales ===
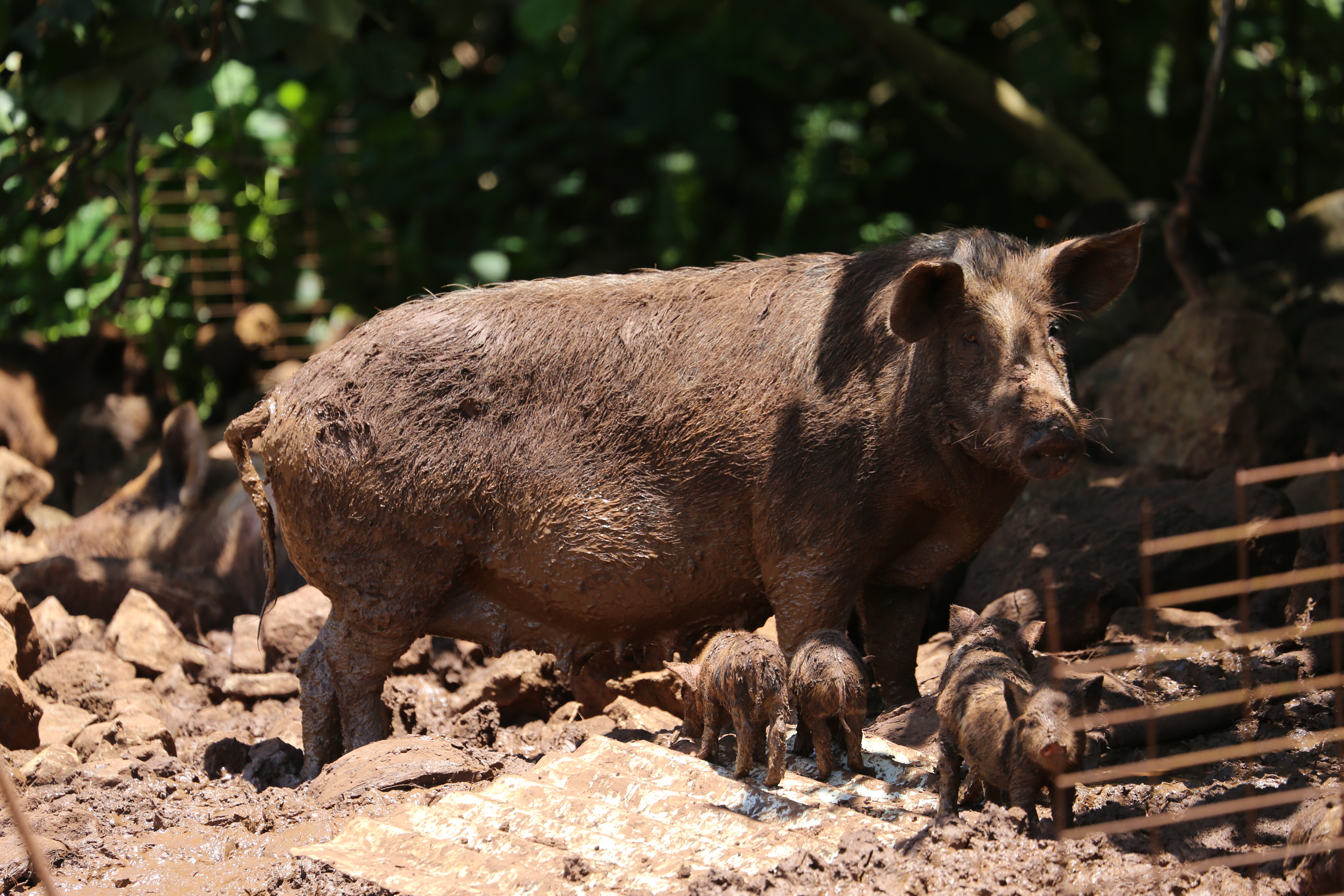
In Wallis and Futuna, most men raise pigs in preparation for customary ceremonies.

The katoaga are an opportunity for men and women to work harder in the fields or in handicrafts, and reinforce cooperation between extended members of the same family. For anthropologist Patrick Vinton Kirch, these ceremonies of exchange of goods force the inhabitants to produce more than would suffice for their subsistence, to always have surpluses to offer. This in turn shapes agricultural production and its by-products (banigs and tapa).

Anthropologist Paul van der Grijp explains that the production of pigs and yams for men, and banigs and tapa for women, is an activity that determines their value in the eyes of the community. The pride of giving one's production is accompanied by the shame of not having enough to give, and of having to buy the necessary goods to compensate. This conception of work largely explains the failure of attempts to create a central market in Wallis in 1976, 1981 and 1987, in a society where market exchange remains very limited.

Nevertheless, the generalization of salaried employment and work for the French administration has brought about a change in attitude, with work on the land (gaue kele) falling into disuse among the new generations. Salaried Wallisians and Futunans, who don't necessarily have the opportunity or time to raise pigs or farm, can buy ceremonial goods. Some local entrepreneurs specialize in raising pigs, and demand for these animals is very high as traditional festivals approach. A large pig can cost up to 300,000 Pacific francs, and many families go into debt to meet their customary obligations. Tubers, banigs and tapa can also be bought from producers, and their sale constitutes an important informal market.

=== Circulation of wealth ===
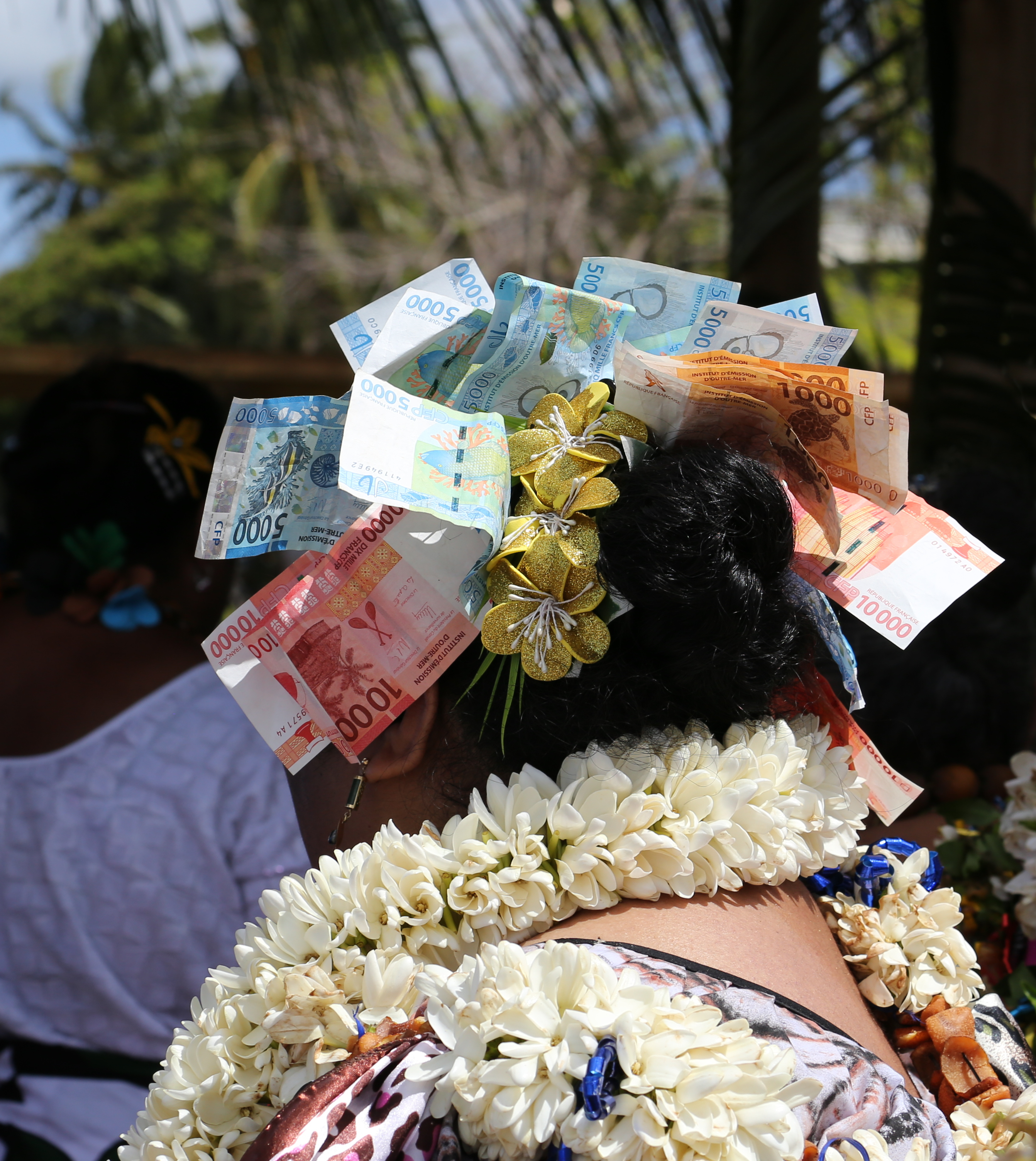
A dancer in Wallis during the Fête de l'Assomption on 15 August 2019. The best performances are rewarded with bills pinned in the hairstyle or stuck in the clothes. The katoaga plays a role in redistributing monetary wealth.

The katoaga play a role in sharing and redistributing wealth in society and preventing hoarding. Anthropologist Sophie Chave-Dartoen notes that "terms such as 'wealth' and 'money' have no equivalent in the Wallisian language, and their translation is problematic". The goods offered at the katoaga are not monopolized by customary chiefs, and do not correspond to their personal wealth: on the contrary, they are offered by villagers in the name of the chief.

Agricultural and fishing products are often distributed within families outside of customary ceremonies, and the katoaga does not meet a requirement for food distribution. However, European consumer goods donated by employees during katoaga ceremonies enable their circulation, and the ceremony "plays an important role in the redistribution of monetary resources". The money collected is donated to the Catholic mission or village cooperatives.

Anthropologist Paul van der Grijp notes that since the introduction of salaried employment in Wallis and Futuna, there has been an "inflation of donations", which have to be ever larger. For example, at a katoaga in Ono in 1997, 160 pigs were exhibited. This is made possible by the increasing monetarization of the Wallisian and Futunan economy, thanks to jobs provided by the French administration and money orders sent by Wallisians and Futunians from New Caledonia. Nevertheless, the majority of Futuna families do not have access to these services and practice subsistence farming. Anthropologist Adriano Favole sees these ever-growing donations as a response to the emergence of major economic inequalities between salaried and non-salaried workers.

== Anthropological analysis ==
=== Gift and personal prestige ===
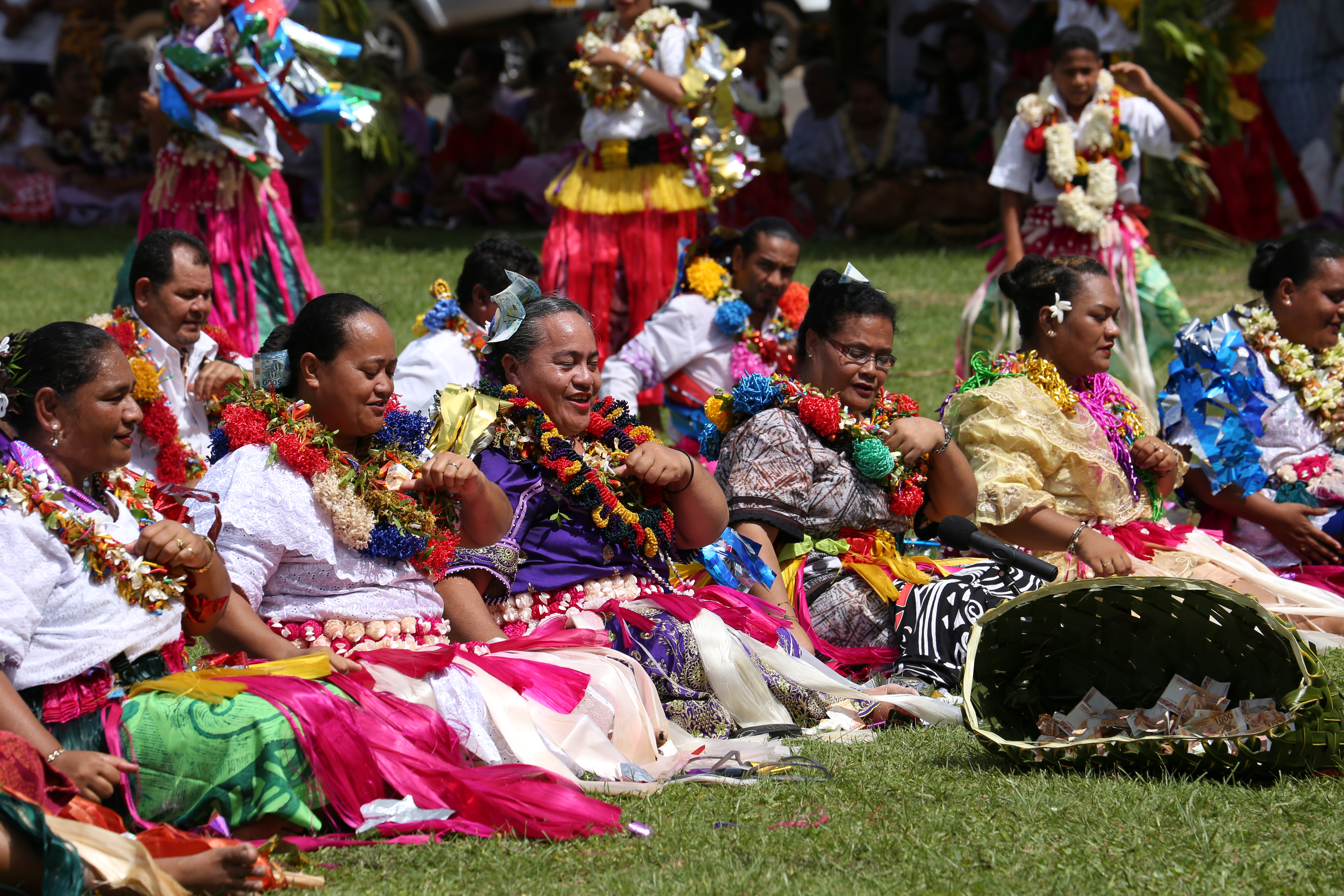
Women's dances for Assumption Day 2019

For anthropologist Dominique Pechberty, katoaga is akin to the potlatch analyzed by Marcel Mauss. It's a ceremony of gifts and counter-gifts, where wealth circulates and confers prestige on those who give it. Thus, it is not the possession of material goods, but rather the ability to give in large quantities, that establishes a person's honor. Conversely, someone arriving at a big party with a small pig will be ridiculed. On the other hand, these gifts are mandatory to maintain one's rank. "The thing given is a source of mana (power) and obliges the giver to give back, if possible with greater splendor".

These gifts also serve an ostentatious purpose, enabling the nobles ('Aliki) to show off their power. A chief's authority is measured by the number of relations he can mobilize for such a ceremony. Adriano Favole points out that participation in a katoaga is a requirement for those wishing to enter politics, and that the katoaga represents a "political arena" in which customary chiefs compete, each wanting to organize a ceremony more dazzling than the others. In Futuna, some katoaga are even the scene of oratorical clashes between rival chiefs.

Some traditional chiefs do not hesitate to go into debt with merchants to buy and distribute large quantities of food to their communities, to consolidate their power and maintain their rank. The katoaga ceremonies thus reveal a "constant evaluation" of social relations: "at each ceremony, each member of the community works to preserve or even increase [his] status".

This modus operandi of Wallisian and Futunansocieties explains in particular the weak power of the French administration at the start of the Wallis and Futuna protectorate, which was not integrated into these ceremonial exchanges.

=== Political authority and socio-cosmic order ===
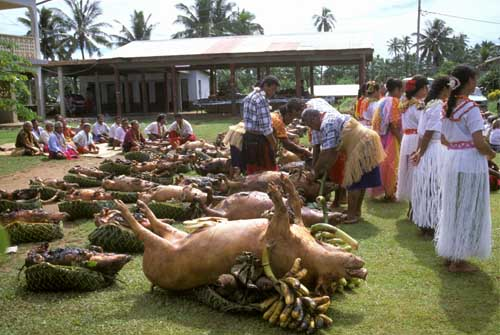
The katoaga is an opportunity to assert the authority of customary chiefs through the scope of the social relations they manage to mobilize in the distribution of wealth (here, a ceremony to mark the feast of Saint Pierre Chanel on 28 April in the 2000s).

Sophie Chave-Dartoen points out that each villager takes part in the preparation of the katoaga "according to the support he wishes to show for the chief and his community". Katoagas are thus an opportunity to demonstrate the unity of the population behind their chief and the authority he exercises. "The chief's authority does not lie in the possession, or even in the free disposal, of wealth [...]; it lies in his ability to gather, in agreement with his community, a large amount of wealth and to distribute it, manifesting [...] the good order of social relations and general prosperity". In the end, participating villagers receive little in the way of material benefits (a share of a pig, a few yams). Nevertheless, the symbolic gains are significant: they confirm individuals' place within the society, gathered around a chief and protected by the ancestors and by God, and can increase personal prestige through the importance of one's gift.

Adriano Favole points out that in Futuna, participation in the katoaga affirms "membership of a social collectivity with the rights and responsibilities – particularly those linked to work – that this entails". On the other hand, "the grandeur of a katoaga reflects the well-being and prosperity of the island, and reveals the skill and strength of the men and women of the organizing village". Nevertheless, for archaeologist Anne di Piazza, the relationship between a chief and the villagers is also an economic one: based on gift and counter-gift, "every gift calls for a return, and if possible [...] with a surplus. From then on, the circuit of exchange cannot be interrupted: there is always a katoaga of delay". It is thus difficult to leave customary exchange networks, on pain of losing all social status. Participation in katoaga is therefore a binding customary obligation.

For Favole, katoaga constitute "cosmo-poiesis rites", "insofar as they aspire to construct (poiêin) an 'order' (cosmos) in the world of men and nature through the definition of hierarchical categories". The katoaga enshrines the hierarchy of Futunan society, with the king (sau) at its head: "the king, the all-encompassing principle, is the supreme guarantor of both social order and the fecundity of nature". The kava and katoaga confirm the "cosmological" character of kingship (as theorized by Marshall Sahlins): in Polynesian culture, the well-being of the population, the life of the king and the alignment of cosmic forces are linked.

Chave-Dartoen points out that the katoaga expresses recognition of the customary chiefs' role as mediators between the world of the living and the world of the dead, as well as with God. Generally speaking, social order and cosmic order go hand in hand in Wallisian and Futunan societies, and it is the role of customary authorities to guarantee respect for the rules that maintain this order. Dominique Pechberty believes that this ceremony enshrines "the essential values of Wallisian culture". Adriano Favole classifies the katoaga as one of the "politics of tradition", in which custom is put on stage, without this being an essentialization of the past: these ceremonies evolve and incorporate new elements, such as money and the Christian religion.

=== Aesthetics ===
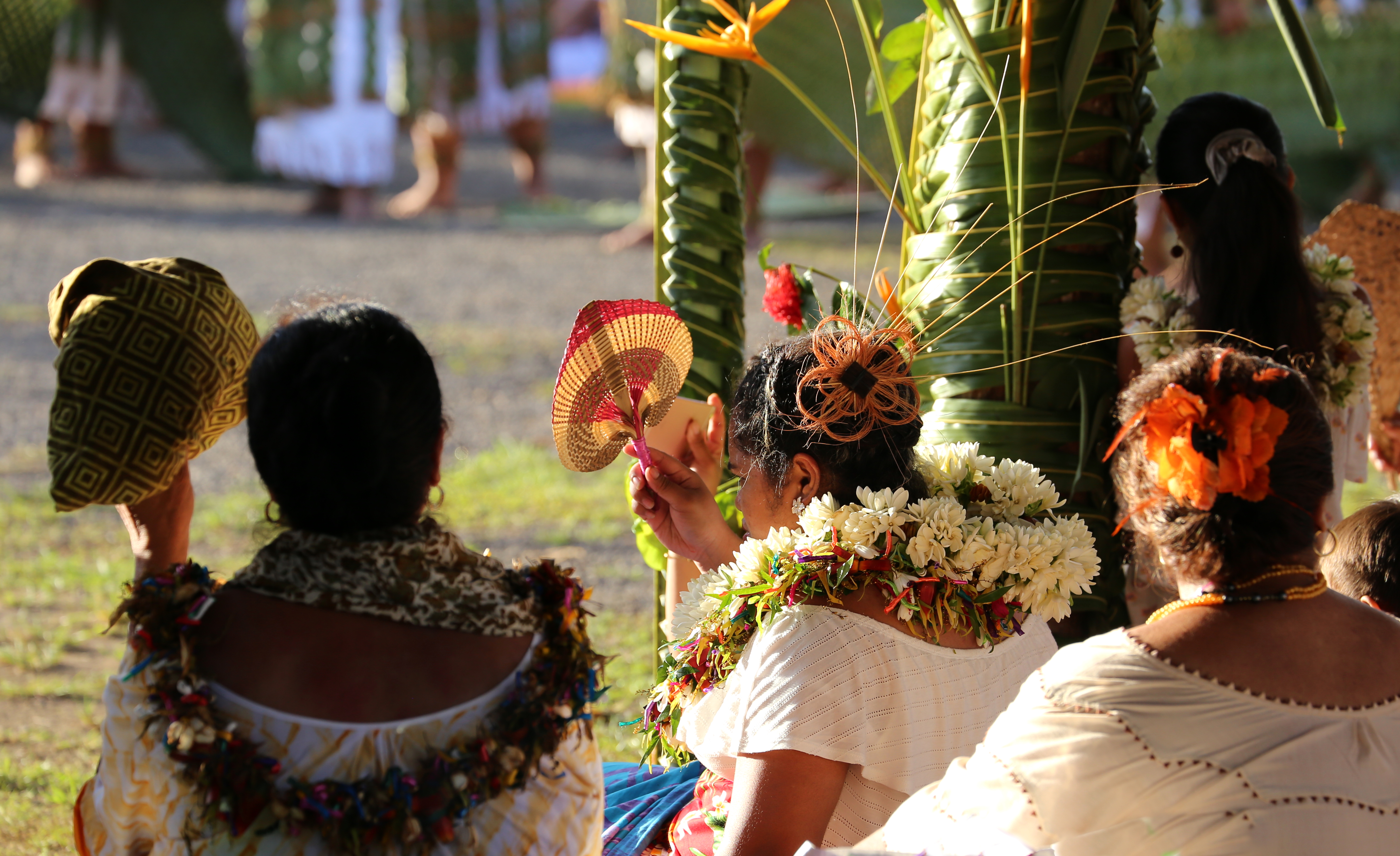
For anthropologist Adriano Favole, katoaga also responds to an aesthetic search for the beautiful and sublime (Wallis, 13 July 2019).

For Adriano Favole, the preparation and execution of a katoaga also responds to the search for a particular aesthetic: "the spectacle offered by the village square covered with reddened pigs illuminated by the first pale lights of the sun, baskets made of woven coconut leaves, bark cloths decorated with local inks and the banner of cloths rising near the beach [ is] considered to be of the utmost beauty" by the locals. It is celebrated by the fakamisimisi poem declaimed before the participants by a customary chief, describing the various goods brought in through metaphors. This search for "the beautiful and the sublime" is also reflected in the participants' clothing and finery (flower necklaces, tattoos, perfumes), and constitutes "a kind of artistic ennoblement of daily work".

== In New Caledonia ==
In the Wallisian and Futunancommunity of New Caledonia, katoaga is much less common than in Wallis and Futuna. In fact, most Wallisians and Futunians have salaried jobs in the city, cannot cultivate land and do not live in the same place. While a chieftaincy linked to those of Uvea and Futuna has been set up, according to the villages and districts of origin, because of the geographical dispersal, village unity no longer exists: "as a result, the exercise of custom loses its meaning". In this context, custom takes on a folkloric aspect around dances, and goods exchanged during katoaga are perceived as costly expenses; hierarchy is often ignored by younger generations who have adopted a Western lifestyle where money and social success have taken precedence over traditional values. However, katoaga is still practiced by a few families on important occasions – pigs and banigs are usually bought for the occasion. Family networks are still active, especially with those who have remained on their home islands.

== See also ==
- Potlatch
- Dance of Wallis and Futuna
- Politics of Wallis and Futuna

== Bibliography ==
- Pechberty, Dominique (1998). "Le katoaga". Journal de la Société des Océanistes (in French). 106 (1): 75–79. doi:10.3406/jso.1998.2043.
- Favole, Adriano (2006). "Le fakamisimisi de Futuna ou l'esthétique du travail quotidien". Journal de la Société des Océanistes (in French) (122–123): 123–139. doi:10.4000/jso.593.
- Van der Grijp, Paul (2008). Projets de marché et représentations locales du travail à Wallis, en Polynésie occidentale (in French). Vol. 127. Actes des congrès nationaux des sociétés historiques et scientifiques.
- Chave-Dartoen, Sophie (2012). "Par-delà la monnaie. Accumulations et circulations cérémonielles de richesses à Wallis (Polynésie occidentale)". Revue Numismatique. 6 (168): 105–117. doi:10.3406/numi.2012.3175.
