= Kapeliele Faupala =

French Wallisian traditional ruler (1940–2026)

- Lavelua of Wallis (Uvea)
- Reign: 25 July 2008 – 2 September 2014.
- Coronation: 25 July 2008
- Predecessor: Tomasi Kulimoetoke II; Council of Ministers
- Successor: Council of Ministers; Patalione Kanimoa
- Born: 29 March 1940; Ahoa, Wallis and Futuna
- Died: 6 August 2026 (aged 86); Ahoa, Wallis and Futuna
- House: Takumasiva Dynasty

Kapeliele "Gabriel" Faupala (29 March 1940 – 6 August 2026) was the Lavelua (King) of Wallis Island (Uvea), one of the three traditional kingdoms which comprise the French overseas territory of Wallis and Futuna. Faupala was officially crowned Lavelua on 25 July 2008, succeeding Tomasi Kulimoetoke II, who died in May 2007. He was removed from office on 2 September 2014.

== Background ==
Faupala was born in Ahoa, Wallis and Futuna on 29 March 1940. He was locally known as Kalae Kivalu before his coronation, by Wallisians. He was chosen by the late King of 'Uvea Tomasi Kulimoetoke II, to become the holder of the "Kalae Kivalu" Title (Prime Minister). He was from the village of Ahoa, which is located in the center of Wallis Island. Faupala was a retired public servant, who worked for the French administration of Wallis and Futuna as well as the local Wallisian public works department until his retirement in 1995.

As Kalae Kivalu, Faupala was head of the Customary Council of Ministers for four years from approximately 2004 until his coronation in 2008. The Customary Council of Ministers enjoys a certain level of official recognition from the government of France under the 1961 treaty signed by Tomasi Kulimoetoke II which made Wallis and Futuna a French overseas territory (Territoire d'Outre-Mer).

Faupala died on 6 August 2026, at the age of 86.

== Lavelua ==
Faupala's predecessor as Lavelua of Wallis, Tomasi Kulimoetoke II, died in May 2007. Kulimoetoke had served as the King for 48 years since his coronation in 1959. A six-month period of mourning was held after Kulimoetoke's death, when it was considered taboo by Wallisians to discuss a possible successor to the throne. Kulimoetoke had a sometimes strained relationship with French authorities during the final years of his reign.

The period of mourning officially ended in November 2007, at which time discussions for a possible successor formally began. A Council of Ministers had taken up the role of royal duties after Kuliemoetoke's death and was charged with finding his successor. Two main feuding royal families of Wallis had been engaged in a behind the scenes fight for the previous three years to secure the throne of Uvea. Their struggle to succeed Kulimoetoke had begun before the previous King's death in 2007. The royal Wallisian families, or clans, were from the North (Hihifo) and South (Mu'a) of Wallis Island. Each offered their own candidate to succeed Kuliemoetoke. Ultimately, after months of deliberations, the traditional Council of Ministers announced in mid July 2008 that Kapiliele Faupala would become the new King of Wallis (Uvea). The announcement of Faupala as the new King sparked protests by the other royal families and clans across Wallis. The North and South royal families also claimed that they should have been actively consulted by the Council in choosing the new monarch for the island.

=== Coronation ===
Kapiliele Faupala was formally crowned the 51st Lavelua of Wallis on 25 July 2008. He chose to retain the title and name of Lavelua. His coronation took place in Mata-Utu, the capital of Wallis and Futuna, on the main grounds of Malae Sagato Soane and gathered more than 2,000 persons where Faupala's predecessor, Tomasi Kulimoetoke II, is buried. The coronation ended several days of formal traditional Wallisian celebrations, which included a kava ceremony and the presentation of gifts to the new King. Faupala was 68 years old at the time of his coronation.

Several of Wallis's chiefly royal families, only in the North (Hihifo), chose not to attend Faupala's coronation due to the ongoing dispute over the royal succession.

The coronation took place in the presence of the French Secretary General to the Administrator Superior of Wallis and Futuna, since the current Administrator Superior, Richard Didier, was traveling outside of Wallis and Futuna at the time. A large delegation from New Caledonia, which is also a French overseas possession, also attended the coronation. New Caledonian dignitaries included Marie-Claude Tjibaou, the then-current Chair of the Agency for the Development of Kanak Culture. A number of pro-French New Caledonian political parties were also represented including the president of Future Together, Didier Leroux. Other New Caledonian political and traditional figures, such as the Chairman of South Province Philippe Gomès and the High Chief of Lifou Island, Evanes Boula, also attended Faupala's coronation on invitation.

The New Caledonian delegation was careful not to become involved with the internal Wallisian royal succession dispute, with Didier Leroux saying "We were invited to attend the ceremonies. But I'd like to point out that we come as external observers and I would not like to take sides in the current quarrel between one side or the other."

Kapeliele Faupala Lavelau of Wallis (Uvea)
Regnal titles
Preceded by Tomasi Kulimoetoke II; Council of Ministers	King of Wallis (Uvea); 25 July 2008 – 2 September 2014	Succeeded by Council of Ministers; Patalione Kanimoa
