= Tomasi Kulimoetoke II =

- 50th Lavelua of Uvea (Wallis Island)
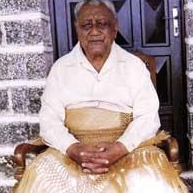

Lavelua of Uvea
- Reign: 12 March 1959 - 7 May 2007
- Predecessor: Aloisia Brial; Council of Ministers
- Successor: Council of Ministers; Kapiliele Faupala
- Born: 26 July 1918; Ha'afuasia, Wallis Island, Wallis and Futuna
- Died: 7 May 2007 (aged 88); Mata'Utu, Wallis
- House: Takumasiva Dynasty

Tomasi Kulimoetoke II (26 July 1918 – 7 May 2007) was the 50th Lavelua (King) of Uvea, which is one of the three traditional kingdoms in the French overseas territory of Wallis and Futuna, from 1959 until his death in 2007.

Tomasi Kulimoetoke was born in Ha'afuasia, Hahake District on Wallis island. He was elected king on 12 March 1959, after a 6 month-rule by a Council of Ministers. In the early years, he supported closer links with France, recognising that Wallis was economically dependent on subsidies. After a national referendum, he signed treaty to make Wallis a French overseas territory (Territoire d'Outre-Mer) in 1961.

In 2002, the king riled many of his countrymen, as well as France, by shutting down the island's only newspaper because it had carried an editorial criticising him for giving refuge to a family friend, after she was sentenced to jail for embezzling public funds. Reformists also mocked the king's insistence that Wallisians dismount from their bicycles when passing his palace.

In 2005, the King nearly lost his throne after his grandson, Tomasi Tuugahala, was sentenced to serve 18 months in prison for the involuntary manslaughter of a pedestrian who was killed in a drunk-driving incident on New Year's Eve. The King invited his grandson to take refuge in the royal palace, where he hid for four months before surrendering to the French gendarmes. The King's Prime Minister, holder of the title "Kalae Kivalu" urged the high administrator of the French government Xavier de Fürst to "quit the territory". The King also claimed that the incident was dealt with according to customary tribal law and that the French penal law should be abolished in Uvea.

Reformists wished to depose the King and install Sosefo Mautamakia Ahau Halagahu, son of the late Halagahu as his successor in the northern district "Hihifo". Local riots occurred and the coronation did not take place. The King retained the throne and would be further recognised as such by France. Several hundred of the King's supporters marched and built roadblocks on the island during the crisis.

His daughter Etua took over his ceremonial duties in later years, when he suffered from poor health. He died in Mata-Utu. A six-month mourning period was observed, during which it was taboo to mention a possible successor.

He had six children.
