= Recognition of same-sex unions in Vanuatu =

Vanuatu does not recognise same-sex marriage, civil unions or any other form of recognition for same-sex couples. In November 2024, the Parliament of Vanuatu amended the Marriage Act to ban same-sex marriages.

== Legal history ==
Recognition of same-sex relationships in Oceania Marriage Marriages performed elsewhere are recognized (American Samoa) No recognition of same-sex couples Constitution limits marriage to opposite-sex couples (Palau, Tuvalu) Same-sex sexual activity illegal, but criminalisation not enforced Same-sex sexual activity illegal (Country names will appear with mouse-overs when map is viewed at full size. Encircling lines are the exclusive economic zones of each state.)

=== Background ===
Vanuatu law previously prohibited consensual, private sexual relations between men, although the law, introduced during the British colonial period, was repealed in 2007. While there is some protection from discrimination on the basis of sexual orientation, societal attitudes toward same-sex unions and homosexuality are generally negative.

Discussions on the legal recognition of same-sex unions first emerged after New Zealand legalised same-sex marriage in 2013. In October 2013, the Minister for Internal Affairs, Patrick Crowby, issued a warning that pastors are not allowed to preside over same-sex marriages. Crowby referred to the Constitution of Vanuatu, which describes the country as "founded on traditional Melanesian values, faith in God, and Christian principles". His announcement followed rumours that a same-sex marriage had been performed in a resort on Iririki. Crowby called for an investigation and said he "would not hesitate to revoke the licence of the pastor and the church involved", as well as penalise the resort for allowing the ceremony to take place on its premises. Pastor Alan Nafuki of the Presbyterian Church of Vanuatu, who was asked to comment by Radio New Zealand, said, "In Vanuatu, being a Christian country, we think it is best that government will review what happened in Vanuatu. And also the government of the day must give the side of the story, that the churches are voicing out our concern at the moment, but we need our government, also, to come out clear on the position of these marriage practises in Vanuatu. I would also say that we are so glad that a country like Australia has not legalised the gay and lesbian marriage. But we know that New Zealand has recently passed a legislation in parliament to have that done. But for Vanuatu, and of course I only speak on behalf of this country, we contend with a very high note that this should not be seen [to be practised] on our land [sic]." The Constitution does not explicitly ban same-sex marriage.

=== Restrictions ===
In June 2014, the Vanuatu Law Commission discussed the issue of same-sex marriage, noting developments in neighbouring Australia and especially New Zealand. The Commission noted that the Marriage Act (Chapter 60; French: Loi sur le mariage; Bislama: Mared Akt) did not explicitly prohibit the recognition of same-sex marriages. It also stated that legalizing same-sex marriage would allow LGBT people to "fulfil their sexual preference or sexual orientation without repression or fear of being prosecuted", but found that religious opposition to legalization would be high. In 2015, it issued a report that the Marriage Act "must expressly prohibit same-sex marriage in Vanuatu" and "must be consistent with the Control of Marriage Act in prohibiting the celebration of same-sex marriage[s] in Vanuatu."

On 14 November 2024, the Parliament of Vanuatu amended the Marriage Act to ban same-sex marriages. Minister of Internal Affairs Andrew Solomon Napuat said, "When the law was passed, it made clear the government's full intention, along with our leaders, that every pastor who performs marriage ceremonies must understand that they cannot conduct a ceremony that is against the law and expect it to be registered." Napuat, who mistakenly stated that the Constitution banned same-sex marriage, added, "If anyone conducts a marriage that does not follow the spirit of the law passed today and seeks our registration, his or her license will be revoked to prevent further marriages. This applies to religious, civil, or traditional ceremonies." The bill was later signed into law by President Nikenike Vurobaravu.

== Historical and customary recognition ==
While there are no records of same-sex marriages being performed in local cultures in the way they are commonly defined in Western legal systems, some communities in Vanuatu recognize identities and relationships that may be placed on the LGBT spectrum. While Vanuatu is almost exclusively Melanesian, there are five Polynesian outlier islands—Emae, Mele, Ifira, Futuna and Aniwa—which, similarly to many other Polynesian societies, recognise a cultural third gender role. These third gender individuals are known as fakafafine in Emae, fakaffine in the Mele-Fila language, and fakafine in the Futuna-Aniwa language. However, there is little literature on the third gender structure on these five islands, unlike in Samoa, Tonga and other Polynesian islands. In Samoa, such individuals are known as faʻafafine and are considered an integral part of society. Historically, if they wished to marry and have children, they would marry women, thus creating the possibility for marriages between two female-presenting individuals to be performed in Samoan culture.

== Religious performance ==
Vanuatu's largest religious organisations are the Presbyterian Church, the Anglican Church of Melanesia and the Catholic Church. The Presbyterian Church expressed opposition to same-sex marriage in 2013, and strongly condemned rumours that a same-sex marriage between two Australians had taken placed in Vanuatu. "We sent a statement that we produced last week for the minister for internal affairs. And we are requesting internal affairs to come up with some kind of policy. We need some immediate guidelines to guide our people here while waiting for the government. to put in legislation that would ban all these practises in Vanuatu [sic]", said Pastor Nafuki in 2013. In May 2023, the Anglican Church, which has one diocese in Vanuatu, issued a statement "that while [it] will always extend and welcome with the love of God people with all forms of sexual orientation, it does not recognize nor will it bless same sex unions." Following the Church of England's decision to allow clergy to bless same-sex civil marriages in 2023, the Anglican Church of Melanesia co-signed a statement that it would "no longer [be] able to recognize" the Archbishop of Canterbury as the leader of the Anglican Communion.

The Church of Jesus Christ of Latter-day Saints in Vanuatu apologised in March 2021 over reports that a same-sex couple had been married in Port Vila the previous month by a church leader. The couple, who presented themselves as "a man and a woman", were later discovered to be of the same sex, and the marriage was annulled. The Catholic Church opposes same-sex marriage and does not allow its priests to officiate at such marriages. In December 2023, the Holy See published Fiducia supplicans, a declaration allowing Catholic priests to bless couples who are not considered to be married according to church teaching, including the blessing of same-sex couples. The Episcopal Conference of the Pacific did not issue a public statement on the declaration. In 2024, a pastor of the Church of the Nazarene expressed support for government plans to forbid same-sex marriages, describing same-sex relationships as "contrary to Vanuatu's customs and constitution".

== See also ==
- LGBT rights in Vanuatu
- Recognition of same-sex unions in Oceania
