= Recognition of same-sex unions in the Federated States of Micronesia =

The Federated States of Micronesia does not recognise same-sex marriage, civil unions or any other form of recognition for same-sex couples. Laws in its four states do not permit marriages between people of the same sex.

== Background ==
According to the Kaleidoscope Australia Human Rights Foundation in 2015, Micronesia "had in recent years given several indications of its support for human rights, including those of LGBTI persons. Despite this, the Federated States of Micronesia [h]as yet to introduce legislative change or take other meaningful steps to recognise these rights." It enacted comprehensive legislation including sexual orientation as a prohibited ground of discrimination in employment and other areas in 2018, but does not recognize same-sex unions in any form. As a result, same-sex couples cannot access the rights and benefits of marriage, including inheritance, tax benefits, domestic violence protections and alimony, among others. Civil unions are also not recognized in Micronesia. The Constitution of the Federated States of Micronesia does not address marriage or the family, and does not explicitly forbid same-sex marriages. There has been no political and societal movements to legalize same-sex marriages or civil partnerships, and the issue is seldom discussed in civil society.

== State laws ==
Recognition of same-sex relationships in Oceania Marriage Marriages performed elsewhere are recognized (American Samoa) No recognition of same-sex couples Constitution limits marriage to opposite-sex couples (Palau, Tuvalu) Same-sex sexual activity illegal, but criminalisation not enforced Same-sex sexual activity illegal (Country names will appear with mouse-overs when map is viewed at full size. Encircling lines are the exclusive economic zones of each state.)

Laws in Micronesia's four states—Chuuk, Kosrae, Pohnpei and Yap—do not permit marriages between people of the same sex. State laws recognize civil and religious marriages, though they generally refer to married spouses in heterosexual terms. They also recognize customary marriages (Pohnpeian: pwopwoud en tiahk en sahpw; Chuukese: apwúpwúlú fán eóreni; Yapese: maabgol ni rogon yalean) performed according to local traditions.

In Pohnpei, marriage between partners of the same sex is not explicitly banned, but laws generally refer to married spouses as "husband and wife". Civil marriage requires a marriage license issued by the Governor of Pohnpei and solemnization performed by civil authorities, whereas religious marriages are solemnized by an ordained minister of a religious denomination. The Constitution of Pohnpei does not expressly address marriage, but Article 5 on "family obligations" states: "To strengthen and retain good family relations in Pohnpei, as needed, this Constitution recognizes and protects the responsibility and authority of parents over their children". Similarly, Chuuk statutory laws do not forbid same-sex marriages, but generally refer to the partners as "husband and wife" or "the male" and "the female". With respect to a marriage involving one or more non-citizens, the statutes say: "The male at the time of contracting the marriage be at least 18 years of age and the female at least 16 years of age..." The Constitution of Chuuk does not contain a definition of marriage or ban same-sex marriage. Likewise, the Constitution of Yap does not address same-sex marriage or marriage explicitly. The marriage laws in Kosrae assume the partners to be of the opposite sex. Section 16.101 of the Kosrae State Code reads: "A marriage performed in the State is valid, if: (a) The male at the time of marriage is at least eighteen years of age and the female at least sixteen years of age, and, if the female is less than eighteen years of age, the marriage has the consent of at least one of the female's parents or her guardian; [...]". (Note: Kosraean: Pahyuck se oreklac ke State ac akihlenyuck, efin: (a) Mukul se ke pacl in pahyuck an year singucul alkosr matwac ac muhtwacn sacn tiac srihk liki year singucul ohnkohsr matwacl, ac, efin muhtwacn sacn srihk liki year singucul alkosr, pahyuck sacn oasr inseselac luhn sie sin pahpah kuh ninac kuh mwet karihngihn muhtwacn sacn; [...].) The Constitution of Kosrae does not define marriage, only stating that "the lawful authority to perform marriage ceremonies shall not be vested in those individuals who hold public office, including the Governor, Lieutenant Governor, Speaker, Vice Speaker, or any State Court justices." In January 2005, a constitutional amendment to ban same-sex marriages was proposed to the Kosrae State Legislature. A committee chaired by Yosiwo George recommended approval of the measure, but eventually the ban was not passed into law.

== Historical and customary recognition ==
While there are no records of same-sex marriages being performed in local cultures in the way they are commonly defined in Western legal systems, some communities recognize identities and relationships that may be placed on the LGBT spectrum. Micronesia has two Polynesian outlier islands—Kapingamarangi and Nukuoro—which may, similarly to many other Polynesian societies, recognise a cultural third gender role. These individuals, whose sex is assigned male at birth, but who embody female gendered behaviours, are known as hakaahina in the Kapingamarangi language and as hagahahine in the Nukuoro language. In Samoa, such individuals are known as faʻafafine and are considered an integral part of society. Historically, if they wished to marry and have children, they would marry women, thus creating the possibility for marriages between two female-presenting individuals to be performed in Samoan culture. A similar third gender structure exists in Chuuk where such individuals are referred to as wininmwáán (pronounced [wininˈmˠaːn]), translating to "women who behave like men". However, "this does not necessarily mean that wininmwáán are sexually active with females [or marry females]".

== Religious performance ==
Micronesia's largest religious denominations are the Catholic Church and the United Church of Christ. The latter, based in the United States, allows its clergy to bless and officiate at same-sex marriages. A resolution to allow same-sex marriages in the United Church was supported by an estimated 80 percent of delegates at the General Synod in 2005. Local congregations and pastors are under no obligation to solemnize same-sex marriages if this would violate their personal beliefs. The Catholic Church does not permit same-sex marriages in its places of worship. In December 2023, the Holy See published Fiducia supplicans, a declaration allowing Catholic priests to bless couples who are not considered to be married according to church teaching, including the blessing of same-sex couples. The Episcopal Conference of the Pacific did not issue a public statement on the declaration.

== See also ==
- LGBT rights in Micronesia
- Recognition of same-sex unions in Oceania
