= Property (Relationships) Amendment Act 2001 =

Act of Parliament in New Zealand

New Zealand Parliament
- Long title: N/A
- Commenced: 1st day of February 2002.

Legislative history
- Passed: 3 April 2001

Amended by
- The Property (Relationships) Act 1976 was renamed from 1 February 2002, by s 5(2) of the Property (Relationships) Amendment Act 2001 (2001 No 5) as a part of these amendments. The title wording of the "Matrimonial Property"; as it was known initially was adjusted to the current "Property (Relationships)". The Act is commonly confused due to this particular amendment.

Related legislation
- Property (Relationships) Act 1976; Property (Relationships) Amendment Act 2005 (2005 No 19)
- Status: Current legislation

The New Zealand Property (Relationships) Amendment Act 2001 was implemented to provide essential updates to the Property (Relationships) Act 1976 (previously called the 'Matrimonial Property Act 1976'). The act updates definitions to include same-sex relationships, death in marriages and De facto separation. It re-outlines requirements in to the division of property and aims to modernize past concepts of relationships, marriage and property involved in such arrangements. The amendment specifically states its recognition of male and female relationship equity, socioeconomic status, same sex relationships and children; providing updates in definition since development in related legislation. The main policy of the Property (Relationships) Amendment Act 2001 cites a goal for equal sharing of property from both relationship parties; upholding values of fairness and justice.

== History ==
The Property (Relationships) Act 1976 was established to deal primarily with the division of the property of married, de facto and civil union couples upon divorce or separation. The initial act was known as the 'Matrimonial Property Act 1976, though was updated upon amendment due to changes in the New Zealand definition of what constitutes a legal relationship. This change in name was a part of the 2001 amendments despite confusion regarding its initial implementation in 1976. This act was amended again in 2005 following the controversial civil union Act 2004; making it legal for same-sex unions to be included under definition as a 'civil-union'. Changing family structures in New Zealand grew the necessity for an amendment to the seemingly outdated relationship definition in 2001.

The addition of the 2001 amendments also sought to further include other circumstances that would otherwise effect the outcome of a division of property. This may include, but is not limited to socio-economic status, de facto relationships, civil unions, division of labour, marriage and native land issues.

== Amendments ==
=== Division of Property ===
The act is mainly applied to define the how property is divided upon termination, separation or death in/of a relationship. The act applies itself differently depending on type and length of relationship. Provisions of the act may also differ depending on whether both beneficiaries are alive or if one is deceased. Property is defined as family home (whenever acquired), all jointly owned property (whether acquired before or after the relationship occurred), proportion of the value of any life insurance policy, any policy of other insurance, proportion of superannuation value, any income or gains, etc.

=== Equal Sharing ===
In Section 1G(d): amended, on 26 April 2005, by section 3(4) of the Property (Relationships) Amendment Act 2005 (2005 No 19), it states that the assessment of the division of property in equal sharing must be noted by: what basis property is divided, relationship tenure of more than 3 years, living standards and income and marital contribution of each partner of the relationship to maintain equity in division. Part 5 of the act also addresses what rights secured and unsecured creditors maintain, and what extent may the share be of unsecured credits a spouse or partner has. The proceeding thus deals with general to more specific issues relating to the division of property but ultimately aims to maintain legal equity and 'fairness' in ultimatum.

=== New Additions ===
The 2001 amendment mainly addressed the recent legislative additions to the definition of a 'relationship' within New Zealand. The purpose of this act is to "reform the law relating to the property of married couples...recognize the equal contribution of husband and wife...and of de facto partnership" and "...to provide for a just division of the relationship property...". The reformed principles of the act follow the guide that: "men and women have equal status", "all forms of contribution...[to the relationship]...have equal status", that a "just division of relationship property has regard to [socio-economic status]" and that "relationship property should be resolved as inexpensively, simply and speedily as is consistent with justice".

== Criticism ==
There has been much academic criticism regarding the effectiveness of the act in cases of agriculture, native land and the general 'effectiveness' of the 2001 amendment. One of the main areas of criticism within the act has been the alleged prevalence of 'sham trusts', 'alter-ego' trusts, the bundle of rights doctrine and 'illusory trusts'. There is a common call for the clarification of definitions to include such cases. There is a growth in the idea that these issues do not allow the legislation to fulfil its original intention. Criticism has also been placed upon the lack of modernity the current amended act entails.

=== De facto Relationships ===
Criticism regarding the balance of equity within the act has also been deconstructed. While the amendment balances gender position and redefines relationship to broaden the individuals involved with property, some inconsistency regarding de facto pairings has been cited. Under the act's amendments, both married and civil union couples maintain higher access to compensation than unmarried de facto couples. The policy of the legislative landscape maintains itself under the guise of equal sharing and the definition and place of de facto relationships within the act therefore somewhat contradicts this. The de facto couple's place outlined in the amendment therefore incites conflict with the core directive of the Property (Relationships) Act. Therefore, the basis of this criticism stems from the contradiction of the act's purpose in maintaining equal sharing for both parties of a relationship against the lack of compensation in de facto pairings. This had led to proposition for change in up-holding policy purpose.

=== Socio-Economic Status ===
Issues regarding the just division of property amongst plaintiffs of varying socio-economic status has also been critiqued in recent years. The current Property (Relationships) Act under amendment does not account for equity in a relationship rather focusing on specifically financial and physical objects of a relationship; i.e. it does not account for a stay-at-home parent or other domestic duties. This division of labour both domestic and work-force related does not appear in detail under definition in the act's amendments and has been highly criticised due to a statistical shift of household labour in New Zealand; often leading to a financial disadvantage to partner A or B. For Example, Women are much more likely to leave the work force after pregnancy while their partners are also statistically likely to support the domestic arrangement financially; thus creating a financial divide between partners despite both individuals retaining a clear role within the familial unit. This inconsistency within definition has led to many cases being decided by court, which out of 15 cases over 16 years, has remained equally as inconsistent and conservative leading to the further call for change in the Amendment.

== Notable Cases ==
=== Ward v Ward ===
The Ward v Ward issue is a commonly presented case that showcases the implementation of the amended 2001 legislation. The couple were married for fourteen years in which the Mr Ward inherited a farming business. Legal advisers recommended the couple invest half the shares. The shares were then transferred in to a trust by the couple and soon began incurring debts owed by the trustees. Upon the couple's separation each plaintiff was owed equal from the incurred debts but the value of the farm had significantly increased in the period. This was noticeably less than what would have been received by Mrs Ward had her relationship property entitlement been retained through share ownership. As Mrs Ward was party to the disposition she retained no ability to s44 to claim that the outcome was to diminish her rights. However the balance of debt incurred outside of the investment trust was not sufficient to cover Mrs Ward's entitlement in the claim. Section 182 of the act therefore allowed Mrs Ward to provide compensation, and the court ordered 50% of the trust to be resettled separately. Had the claimants maintained a de facto relationship, section 182 would not have been lawful and Mrs Ward would not have received her perceived compensation and redress. This case is often cited in presenting inconsistencies within the 2001 amendments of the Property (Relationships) Act.

=== O v S ===
The O v S case presents a result in which a de facto relationship sees a seemingly more unfair order over property ownership. This case is commonly cited due to its example of de facto relationship status remaining inconsistent with the 2001 Amendment Act's core policy. The O and S parties maintained a de facto relationship for 10 years prior to separation. The related trust was discovered as an alter-ego and therefore justified a trust claim of $75,000; the judge however ordered in favour of the Property (Relationships) Act. Though there was an attempt to defeat rights under s44, property was received by the second respondents under good faith. Compensation was still ordered however, the judge allowed the husband the ability to raise the funds on the basis of past business evidence. Thus, the wife would have to wait for redress on the husband's terms despite other income and trust sources. Had O and S been married, this outcome would have likely presented different results. This case has led to much criticism regarding the status and definition of trusts in New Zealand legislation, citing in-coherency of definition.

== Future Propositions ==
A call for a modern-approach has been increasingly active to reform current relationship legislation. increasing criticism has paved further discussion regarding future amendments to the act. This includes the addition of definitions relating to UN-specified trusts, native land entitlements and further clarification of legislative definitions.

Other propositions include the further redefinition of relationships. The 2001 amendments aimed to readdress relationship standings within legislation, further specification has been cited as an area for redevelopment. The case of Ward V Ward brought a conceptual flaw to light regarding the amendment act's original policy of maintaining equal sharing in a relationship. The lack of specification regarding de facto relationships in this amendment has warranted lawmakers to suggest changes to amend this and further fulfil the act's core directive.

The topic of immeasurable contributions within relationships has also maintained significant controversy under the 2001 amendment's redefinition. This has led for a call to update such definitions to add more specific terms for ease of property distribution. Domestic duties, child birth and child care are relationship contributions that cannot be divided upon separation and can therefore leave some individuals short-handed following separation or divorce. Future proposals have named the addition of these actions in a relationship to be included as part of a newly proposed amendment to further conceptual relationship equity post-separation as opposed to the current policy of equal sharing. The current status of equality within the 2001 amendment has left some individuals without an equal share of the relationship; as seen in the case of O v S. O v S and cases not too dissimilar have left a growing movement of proposal that is not un-welcomed by New Zealand legislators, and is therefore not unlikely to have observed changes and additions made in future.
