= Recognition of same-sex unions in Palau =

Palau does not recognise same-sex marriage, civil unions or any other form of recognition for same-sex couples. The Constitution of Palau has forbidden same-sex marriages since 2008, though a campaign to repeal this ban was launched in 2019.

== Legal history ==
=== Background ===
Traditional Palauan marriages (Palauan: chebechiil) were matrilineal, exogamous and arranged by the clan, but today individuals may choose their own partners. Chiefs played an important role in negotiating the unions, which were marked by formal exchange of prescribed foods and wealth between the spouses. Concubinage (klumengelungel) was also recognized as an institutionalized practice, despite attempts by Spanish and German authorities to discourage it during colonization. Additionally, Christianity was introduced to Palau during the colonial period, shaping societal and cultural perceptions on family and homosexuality. Anal intercourse between men became illegal under colonial law during this time. The law was repealed with the enactment of a new penal code in 2014. Nevertheless, society generally does not accept same-sex relationships, and LGBT people continue to experience social marginalisation and discrimination today.

It is unknown whether Palauan society historically recognised a third gender structure, as seen in other Micronesian cultures such as Chuuk. The contemporary word for a "homosexual" is mengol a otaor, which may be viewed as derogatory, based on the word for "concubine" mengol.

=== Constitutional ban ===
The Constitution of Palau (Palauan: Uchetemel a llach er a beluu er a Belau) has defined marriage as between "a man and a woman" since 2008. The constitutional ban was among 22 amendments passed during a referendum on November 4, 2008. Previously, the Constitution did not address same-sex marriage explicitly. The states of Palau also have their own constitutions, although none address marriage or ban same-sex marriage. For instance, the Constitution of Hatohobei (Tobian: Hufehiri Farau ri Faruheri Hatohobei) states that all citizens shall "enjoy such other rights and privileges as may be provided by customs and traditions and as may be provided by law", but does not address marriage or rights for the LGBT community. Article IV, Section 13 of the Constitution of Palau was amended to read:

The government shall provide for marital and related parental rights, privileges and responsibilities on the basis of equality between men and women, mutual consent and cooperation. All marriages contracted within the Republic of Palau shall be between a man and a woman. Parents or individuals acting in the capacity of parents shall be legally responsible for the support and for the unlawful conduct of their minor children as prescribed by law. (Note: The previous text did not contain the sentence on marriage: A Amt a mo kudmokl a kerebil a llemalt el kirel a chebechiil ma klengelakel ma rolel a klungiaol ma ngerachel el oltirakl er a osisiu el deruchall er a sechal ma redil, ma klaingeseu ma kengei er a delongelir. A rechedam ma rechedil, ma rumtechei er tir er a deruchellir, a mo oungerachel a okedmeklir ma ikel mekngit er a llach el omerellir a rengesonges a rekrir el ngelekir el oltirakl a kldmokl er a llach., translating to "The government shall provide for marital and related parental rights, privileges and responsibilities on the basis of equality between men and women, mutual consent and cooperation. Parents or individuals acting in the capacity of parents shall be legally responsible for the support and for the unlawful conduct of their minor children as prescribed by law.")

In July 2019, in response to a question at a weekly press conference, President Tommy Remengesau Jr. said he supported repealing the ban, branding it discriminatory and saying he believed in "full equality". "Those who are different doesn't mean that they should be outcast, second class citizens, or that they can't contribute to the community. So I want to make it clear that I don't believe in the constitutional amendment that promote[s] discrimination. I want it to be on record that I support the rights of each individual, any Palauan, to be treated equally... Let us treat each other with respect and dignity. This won't be positive for us at the UN level as the trend worldwide is opening up to these individual rights, but we are taking a step backward", he said. He finished his statements with "as long as they believe in God like everyone else, we can treat each other with respect and dignity". Local activists called his comments a "very surprising and progressive act". A popular initiative led by Pearl Marumoto and Rondy Ronny, announced on a Palauan television talk show, was launched in 2019 to legalise same-sex marriage in Palau. The organisers sought the support of 25 percent of registered voters, as required by the Palauan Constitution, to facilitate a vote on repealing the constitutional ban on same-sex marriages. For the Constitution to be amended, a simple majority of votes cast and approval in 12 of the 16 states of Palau is required. Local observers said the initiative faced "an uphill battle". No referendum on repealing the ban has taken place as of 2024.

=== Statutory laws ===
Recognition of same-sex relationships in Oceania Marriage Marriages performed elsewhere are recognized (American Samoa) No recognition of same-sex couples Constitution limits marriage to opposite-sex couples (Palau, Tuvalu) Same-sex sexual activity illegal, but criminalisation not enforced Same-sex sexual activity illegal (Country names will appear with mouse-overs when map is viewed at full size. Encircling lines are the exclusive economic zones of each state.)

The National Code (Palauan: Llach er a Belau; Sonsorolese: Farau ri Panou; Tobian: Farau ri Panou; Japanese: パラオ国法, Parao Kokuhō) stipulates the legal requirements necessary for the issuance of a marriage license between two citizens, between two non-citizens, and between a non-citizen and a citizen. The code does not expressly forbid same-sex marriages, but its provisions on marriages between two non-citizens or between a citizen and a non-citizen state that "the male" must be at least 18 years of age and "the female" at least 16 years of age. In February 2014, a bill was introduced to the Senate of Palau to define marriage in the National Code as being between "a man and a woman" in order to give statutory effect to the new constitutional definition of marriage. The bill passed its first reading in May 2014, but eventually did not pass the National Congress. The Kaleidoscope Australia Human Rights Foundation (KHRF) considered that if enacted, the bill would have "further entrench[ed] discrimination against same-sex couples in Palauan law". At Palau's second Universal Periodic Review on 21 January 2016, Spain recommended the government to legalize same-sex marriage. The government "noted" (rejected) these recommendations. Palau also does not recognize civil unions, which would provide same-sex couples with some of the rights and benefits of marriage. The KHRF reported in 2016 that the constitutional definition of marriage "[does] not hinder the ability of the National Congress to legislate for other forms of relationship recognition".

Palauan law does not expressly ban the recognition of same-sex marriages validly performed abroad, but an attempt to register an overseas same-sex marriage was denied in 2014. This refusal was not pursued in court. A 2023 government report recommended allowing same-sex couples married abroad to be recognized and allow surviving spouses to access insurance social security benefits. The report, which according to Vice President Uduch Sengebau Senior can serve as "valuable resource for informed-decision making and policy formulation", also noted that the "LGBT community in Palau supports the removal of the constitutional provision against same-sex marriage".

== Religious performance ==
The Catholic Church, the largest religious denomination in Palau, opposes same-sex marriage and does not allow its priests to officiate at such marriages. In December 2023, the Holy See published Fiducia supplicans, a declaration allowing Catholic priests to bless couples who are not considered to be married according to church teaching, including the blessing of same-sex couples. The Episcopal Conference of the Pacific did not issue a public statement on the declaration. The stance of Modekngei, a hybrid of ancient Palauan customs and Christianity, on same-sex unions is not explicitly detailed.

== See also ==
- LGBT rights in Palau
- Recognition of same-sex unions in Oceania
