= Marriage Act 1955 =

Act of Parliament in New Zealand

New Zealand Parliament
- Long title: An Act to consolidate and amend the law relating to marriage
- Royal assent: 27 October 1955
- Commenced: 1 April 1956
- Administered by: Ministry of Justice

Legislative history
- Passed: 1955

Amended by
- Marriage Amendment Act 2005; Marriage (Definition of Marriage) Amendment Act 2013

Related legislation
- Marriage Act 1854; Marriage Act 1908; Property (Relationships) Act 1976; Births, Deaths, Marriages, and Relationships Registration Act 1995; Civil Union Act 2004
- Status: Current legislation

The Marriage Act is an Act of Parliament that was passed in 1955 in New Zealand and is administered by the Ministry of Justice. It repealed the Marriage Act 1908.

Forbidden marriages, being those between relatives and relatives in a civil union, are detailed in Schedule 2 of the Act.

The Act led to some enactments by the Parliament of England and the Parliament of the United Kingdom to cease having an effect in New Zealand, the earliest being the Ecclesiastical Licences Act 1536.

== See also ==
- Marriage in New Zealand
- Civil union in New Zealand
- Same-sex marriage in New Zealand
- Polygamy in New Zealand
