= Recognition of same-sex unions in the Cook Islands =

The Cook Islands does not recognise same-sex marriage, civil unions or any other form of recognition for same-sex couples. Even though same-sex marriage has been legal in New Zealand since August 2013, the Parliament of the Cook Islands has legislative competence to make changes to the law on marriage.

== Legal history ==
=== Background ===
Homosexuality was decriminalised in the Cook Islands with the passage of the Crimes (Sexual Offences) Amendment Act by the Parliament of the Cook Islands in 2023. Although the law had never been enforced, it proscribed up to seven years' imprisonment for consensual, private sexual relations between men. As a self-governing associated state of New Zealand, the Parliament has legislative competence to make changes to the law on marriage. As a result, the Marriage (Definition of Marriage) Amendment Act 2013, which legalised same-sex marriage in New Zealand, does not apply to the Cook Islands. Societal attitudes toward same-sex unions and LGBT rights more broadly differ significantly from New Zealand. While discussing the decriminalisation bill in 2023, MP Teariki Heather referenced New Zealand's legalisation of same-sex marriage to justify his opposition to the legislation; "Do we want to become like them? Do we want to receive the consequences?"

On 28 April 2013, shortly following passage of same-sex marriage legislation in the New Zealand House of Representatives, Prime Minister Henry Puna expressed his personal opposition to the legalisation of same-sex marriage. Puna argued that the "Cook Islands' 'Christian values' and 'tradition' prevent[ed] it from adopting marriage equality". In November 2015, two Cook Island women who had married in New Zealand were barred by local traditional leaders from renewing their vows in Arorangi and Ngatangiia. The chairman of the aronga mana (traditional leaders council) in Puaikura, Arorangi said the council had voted unanimously to block the ceremony from taking place: "As far as we're concerned in our village, we condone these kind of things, this behaviour. It's not the people, it's the stuff they're doing, we condone it."

=== Restrictions ===
Recognition of same-sex relationships in Oceania Marriage Marriages performed elsewhere are recognized (American Samoa) No recognition of same-sex couples Constitution limits marriage to opposite-sex couples (Palau, Tuvalu) Same-sex sexual activity illegal, but criminalisation not enforced Same-sex sexual activity illegal (Country names will appear with mouse-overs when map is viewed at full size. Encircling lines are the exclusive economic zones of each state.)

The Marriage Act (Act 6 of 1973; Cook Islands Māori: Te Ture nō te ‘Akaipoipo‘anga; Pukapukan: Tule o Akaaonga) outlaws same-sex marriage. An explicit prohibition on marriages between persons of the same sex was enacted by the Marriage Amendment Act 2000, and later the Marriage Amendment Act 2007. The 2007 law clarified that "no person shall be permitted to marry another person who is of the same gender as him or herself." The Constitution of the Cook Islands does not address marriage or expressly forbid same-sex marriages. Civil unions, which would offer some of the rights and benefits of marriage, are likewise not recognised in the Cook Islands. As a result, same-sex couples do not have access to the legal rights, benefits and obligations of marriage, including protection from domestic violence, adoption rights, tax benefits and inheritance rights, among others.

== Historical and customary recognition ==
While there are no records of same-sex marriages being performed in local cultures in the way they are commonly defined in Western legal systems, local communities recognize identities and relationships that may be placed on the LGBT spectrum. Like most of Polynesia, the Cook Islands has traditionally recognised a third gender structure known in Cook Islands Māori as akavaʻine (pronounced [akavaˈʔine]; Pukapukan: wakawawine). The term refers to individuals who identify as female but are biologically male. Akavaʻine engage in women's work, such as cooking, cleaning and sewing, tend to socialise with women and tend to wear female clothing, but have little desire to have sex with other akavaʻine. They typically have sex with heterosexual men, who do not consider themselves, nor are they considered by others, to be "homosexual". Nowadays, there exists a relative tolerance and acceptance of akavaʻine in terms of their public behaviour, but a near complete avoidance of akavaʻine sexuality as a topic of discussion. In neighbouring Samoa, such individuals are known as faʻafafine and are considered an integral part of society. Historically, if they wished to marry and have children, they would marry women, thus creating the possibility for marriages between two female-presenting individuals to be performed in Samoan culture.

== Religious performance ==
The largest Christian denomination in the Cook Islands is the Cook Islands Christian Church, which accounts for about 43% of the population according to the 2021 census. The Christian Church is firmly opposed to same-sex marriage. Reverend Tinirau Soatini said in 2015: "I believe in scriptures and scriptures and the word of God, that god created man and female, male and female to reproduce, to create human beings, to create another being. So the scriptures says that a man and woman leaves their father and mother and becomes one body." The Catholic Church also opposes same-sex marriage and does not allow its priests to officiate at such marriages. In December 2023, the Holy See published Fiducia supplicans, a declaration allowing Catholic priests to bless couples who are not considered to be married according to church teaching, including the blessing of same-sex couples. The Episcopal Conference of the Pacific did not issue a public statement on the declaration.

In 2014, the synod of the Anglican Church in Aotearoa, New Zealand and Polynesia passed a resolution creating a pathway towards the blessing of same-sex relationships. In the meantime, "clergy should be permitted 'to recognise in public worship' a same-gender civil union or state marriage of members of their faith community." Some dioceses in New Zealand offer a "relationship blessing", notably the dioceses of Auckland, Dunedin, and Waiapu. In May 2018, the Anglican Church voted to allow its ministers to bless same-sex civil marriages and unions. Ministers may offer their blessing to civil marriages but are not permitted to perform same-sex wedding ceremonies in the church. The move does not apply to the Diocese of Polynesia. In a separate motion, the synod said that it was "deeply mindful of the deep interweaving of cultural and religious values at the core of our Pacific societies that place a profound respect, and reverence for the belief in God and the belief in the traditional understanding of marriage."

== See also ==
- LGBTQ rights in the Cook Islands
- Same-sex marriage in New Zealand
- Recognition of same-sex unions in Oceania
