= Polygamy in New Zealand =

Polygyny

Polygamous marriages may not be performed in New Zealand. A married person who enters into another marriage in New Zealand is guilty of the crime of bigamy. Similar rules apply for civil unions, which have been legal in New Zealand since 2005. However, polygamous marriages legally performed in another country have limited recognition in New Zealand law, provided that no person involved was living in New Zealand at the time of the union.

Advocacy for full legalisation of polygamy in New Zealand has come from some libertarian individuals and from individual members of non-Christian religious groups. However, polygamy has little public support among New Zealanders, and no major political party has endorsed its legalisation.

== History ==
Polygamy existed in traditional Māori society to a limited extent, mostly practised by rangatira (tribal chiefs). When New Zealand was annexed into the British Empire in 1840, British law took effect that prohibited polygamous marriage. Colonial law permitted Māori to marry under their own marriage customs, which continued until 1888 (although polygamy was practised in Māori society – legally or otherwise – well into the 20th century). But in general, polygamy has remained prohibited in New Zealand law.

== Legislation ==
Marriage is regulated in New Zealand by the Marriage Act 1955. As originally enacted, this Act, and earlier Marriage Acts, offered no definition of marriage and did not specify the sex, sexual orientation, gender identity or number of partners that may be involved in a marriage leaving this to the common law. From the 19th of August 2013, the Marriage (Definition of Marriage) Amendment Act 2013 amendment the 1955 Act to explicitly allow same-sex marriages by adding a definition that defined marriage as: "marriage means the union of 2 people, regardless of their sex, sexual orientation, or gender identity". The Commentary on the Bill referred back from the select committee indicates that the definition inserted was to "clarify that a marriage is between two people regardless of their sex, sexual orientation, or gender identity" but gives no indication that the question of polygamy was considered.

A person who is married or in a civil union recognised by New Zealand law, and who subsequently enters into a formal marriage or civil union recognised by New Zealand law with another person in New Zealand, can be charged with bigamy, which is a crime under section 205 of the Crimes Act 1961 and carries a two to seven years imprisonment penalty.

Polygamous marriages cannot be solemnised in New Zealand. However, polygamy receives limited recognition in New Zealand under the Family Proceedings Act 1980. Section 2 of the Act states that:

marriage includes a union in the nature of marriage that—

(a) is entered into outside New Zealand; and
(b) is at any time polygamous,—

where the law of the country in which each of the parties is domiciled at the time of the union then permits polygamy

== Public debate and advocacy ==
Small libertarian organisations and some individual members of non-Christian religious faiths have advocated for the full legalisation of polygamy in New Zealand. However, there is little public support for legalised polygamy among New Zealanders, nor has it been endorsed by any major political party.

In 2008, Social Development Minister Ruth Dyson was alleged to have given a speech supporting diverse family structures, including "triples". Dyson denied giving the speech, given that she did not cite such material within the original draft within her actual speech, and confirmed that the government had no plans to legalise polygamy.

Polygamy also featured during the public debate surrounding same-sex marriage in New Zealand. When a private member's bill was drawn from the parliamentary ballot in 2012 to legalise same-sex marriage, opponents of the bill warned that allowing same-sex couples to marry could lead to polygamy being legalised in New Zealand. Supporters of the bill responded that they were opposed to any such recognition of polygamy, and cited the British Columbia Supreme Court's Bountiful case from November 2011) as an example of recent British Commonwealth case law which upheld Section 293 of the Canadian Criminal Code and still prohibits polygamy in Canada. They argued that given this recent Commonwealth case law, any pro-polygamy litigation would face opposition for legal recognition

== See also ==
- Marriage in New Zealand
