= Recognition of same-sex unions in Fiji =

Fiji does not recognise same-sex marriage, civil unions or any other form of recognition for same-sex couples. The Marriage Act defines marriage as "the voluntary union of one man to one woman", although the Constitution of Fiji guarantees equal protection before the law to all citizens regardless of sexual orientation.

== Legal history ==
=== Background ===
On 26 March 2013, Prime Minister Frank Bainimarama expressed opposition to the recognition of same-sex marriage. Answering a question raised by a caller on a radio talk-back programme, he stated that same-sex marriage "will not be allowed because it is against religious beliefs". In April 2013, a support group representing LGBT students, the Drodrolagi Movement, called for a discussion on the issue. In January 2016, Bainimarama reiterated his opposition to same-sex marriage, saying "there will be no same-sex marriage in Fiji" and suggested that lesbian couples seeking to marry move to Iceland. He reiterated his opposition in April 2019, saying, "As long as we are in government – Fiji will not allow same-sex marriage", because Fiji is a "God-fearing country". His stance was backed by the Catholic Church, the Methodist Church of Fiji and Rotuma and the Fiji Muslim League. The Fiji Coalition on Human Rights said it was "disappointed and disturbed" by Bainimarama's stance, arguing that his remarks go against the basis of Fiji's laws and contradicted his commitment to the United Nations Human Rights Council. That same month, the director of the Fiji Human Rights and Anti-Discrimination Commission, Ashwin Raj, argued that "same-sex marriage [was] not a right", but suggested that "there need[ed] to be more clarity on what the Constitution of Fiji states on the issue of same-sex marriage". Raj added that "the priority must be towards addressing discrimination faced by the LGBTI community", and called for "a calm and rational debate".

=== Restrictions ===
Recognition of same-sex relationships in Oceania Marriage Marriages performed elsewhere are recognized (American Samoa) No recognition of same-sex couples Constitution limits marriage to opposite-sex couples (Palau, Tuvalu) Same-sex sexual activity illegal, but criminalisation not enforced Same-sex sexual activity illegal (Country names will appear with mouse-overs when map is viewed at full size. Encircling lines are the exclusive economic zones of each state.)

Fiji family law does not provide legal recognition to same-sex marriages or civil unions. In 2002, the Marriage Act 1968 (Chapter 50; Fijian: Lawa ni Vakamau, pronounced [ˈlaɰa ni βakaˈmɔu̯]; Fiji Hindi: विवाह कानून, Vivaah Kanoon; Rotuman: Foho ne ʻInoso) was amended to state that "marriage in Fiji shall be the voluntary union of one man to one woman to the exclusion of all others". In May 2022, the former director of the Fiji Human Rights Commission, Shaista Shameem, called on same-sex couples to challenge the act in court. Shameem said the same-sex marriage ban may violate Article 26(3) of the Constitution, which bans discrimination based on sexual orientation:

A person must not be unfairly discriminated against, directly or indirectly on the grounds of his or her

(a) actual or supposed personal characteristics or circumstances, including race, culture, ethnic or social origin, colour, place of origin, sex, gender, sexual orientation, gender identity and expression, birth, primary language, economic or social or health status, disability, age, religion, conscience, marital status or pregnancy; or
(b) opinions or beliefs, except to the extent that those opinions or beliefs involve harm to others or the diminution of the rights or freedoms of others,

or on any other ground prohibited by this Constitution.

Despite opposition from religious groups, protection against discrimination based on sexual orientation had been introduced in 1998; Fiji being among the first three countries in the world to adopt such a constitutional protection, alongside South Africa and Ecuador. In 2022, Fijian-New Zealand activist Shaneel Lal called on the Fijian Government to allow same-sex marriage. When asked to comment on the recognition of same-sex marriage in May 2022, spokespeople for the Unity Fiji Party, the Social Democratic Liberal Party and the National Federation Party said their parties had no official position on the matter. In 2026, the government formed a constitutional commission mandated with examining and amending the Constitution. On 30 September, Prime Minister Sitiveni Rabuka introduced a draft bill to the Parliament of Fiji proposing various amendments to the Constitution. Although the draft text maintains the constitutional protection against discrimination based on sexual orientation, it introduces a new clause that explicitly shields laws on "adoption, marriage, devolution of property on death, and pension" from constitutional challenge on discrimination grounds. In October, religious groups called for an explicit constitutional ban on same-sex marriage to be added to the draft text.

== Historical and customary recognition ==
While there are no records of same-sex marriages being performed in Fijian culture in the way they are commonly defined in Western legal systems, local communities recognize identities and relationships that may be placed on the LGBT spectrum. Prior to European colonisation and the conversion of the local Fijian population to Christianity in the 19th century, Fijian society authorised homosexual activity through ritual or in the cultural practice of gender liminality. While they may be homosexual, gender-liminal males, known in Fijian as vakasalewalewa (pronounced [βakaˈsaːleɰaleɰa]), are "deemed not to emphasise their sexual orientation as a fixed aspect of their identity but rather are seen to borrow a range of 'social and cultural attributes and symbols' from the opposite sex in ways that are 'foregrounded and backgrounded according to social context'". This "deeply embedded" tradition has been shaped by the Western introduction of "conservative Christian morality", and leading gender-liminal males to experience social marginalisation and discrimination today. The modern term qauri (pronounced [ŋɡɔu̯ˈriː]), of Hindi origin, is used to collectively describe all non-heterosexual male-bodied people in Fiji.

== Religious performance ==
The largest Christian denominations in Fiji are the Methodist Church of Fiji and Rotuma and the Catholic Church, which together account for around 80% of Fiji's Christian population. The Methodist Church has been vociferously opposed to same-sex marriage and LGBT rights, arguing that homosexuality "threatens the stability of key institutions in Fiji's society" and violates "Christian standards of morality". "The Methodist Church opposes same-sex marriage. That is still our stand at the moment", said Reverend Jolame Lawasa in 2024. It reiterated its opposition in 2025, with Reverend Semisi Turagavou stating that "[i]t is not something we will be practising. It is against our faith." In 2026, it explicitly called for a constitutional ban on same-sex marriage and establishing Christianity as the state religion. The Catholic Church also opposes same-sex marriage and does not allow its priests to officiate at such marriages. In December 2023, the Holy See published Fiducia supplicans, a declaration allowing Catholic priests to bless couples who are not considered to be married according to church teaching, including the blessing of same-sex couples. The Episcopal Conference of the Pacific did not issue a public statement on the declaration. The Archbishop of Suva, Peter Loy Chong, stated in 2015, "The culture and religion is strong here. It is going to, it will happen but I do not think it is going to happen in a very fast pace in the way it is taking place overseas." Along with the Fiji Muslim League, both denominations supported Prime Minister Bainimarama's public rejection of same-sex marriage in 2019.

In 2014, the synod of the Anglican Church in Aotearoa, New Zealand and Polynesia passed a resolution creating a pathway towards the blessing of same-sex relationships. In the meantime, "clergy should be permitted 'to recognise in public worship' a same-gender civil union or state marriage of members of their faith community." Some dioceses in New Zealand offer a "relationship blessing", notably the dioceses of Auckland, Dunedin, and Waiapu. In May 2018, the Anglican Church voted to allow its ministers to bless same-sex civil marriages and unions. Ministers may offer their blessing to civil marriages but are not permitted to perform same-sex wedding ceremonies in the church. The move does not apply to the Diocese of Polynesia. In a separate motion, the synod said that it was "deeply mindful of the deep interweaving of cultural and religious values at the core of our Pacific societies that place a profound respect, and reverence for the belief in God and the belief in the traditional understanding of marriage."

Hinduism is Fiji's second largest religion, accounting for a majority of Indo-Fijians. In 2016, a same-sex couple held a secret Hindu wedding ceremony in Suva alongside friends and family, though the marriage lacks legal recognition in Fiji. The couple said, "We had to keep it quiet. We had to be sure whoever we invited was open-minded. At that time [2016] the military was … loud about their disagreement with homosexuals and had we gotten caught we would've been taken to barracks."

== See also ==
- LGBT rights in Fiji
- Recognition of same-sex unions in Oceania
