= Ecclesiastical Licences Act 1536 =

Act of the Parliament of England

Ecclesiastical Licences Act 1536 (Note: The citation of this act by this short title was authorised by section 5 of, and the second schedule to, the Statute Law Revision Act 1948. Due to the repeal of those provisions, it is now authorised by section 19(2) of the Interpretation Act 1978.)
- Act of Parliament
- Parliament of England
- Long title: An Acte for the release of suche as have obteyned pretended Lycences and Dispensacions from the See of Rome. (Note: These words are printed against this act in the second column of the second schedule to the Statute Law Revision Act 1948, which is headed "Title".)
- Citation: 28 Hen. 8. c. 16
- Territorial extent: England and Wales

Dates
- Royal assent: 18 July 1536
- Commencement: 8 June 1536 (Note: Start of session.)
- Repealed: 1 January 1970

Other legislation
- Repealed by: Statute Law Revision Act 1948; Criminal Law Act 1967Statute Law (Repeals) Act 1969
- Relates to: Statute of Praemunire

Status: Repealed

Text of statute as originally enacted

The Ecclesiastical Licences Act 1536 (28 Hen. 8. c. 16) was an act of the Parliament of England.

== Subsequent developments ==
The preamble to, and section 2 of, the act was repealed by section 1 of, and the first schedule to, the Statute Law Revision Act 1948 (11 & 12 Geo. 6. c. 62), which came into force on 30 July 1948.

The words "And that all ecclesiasticall" to "their obedience and" in section 3, and section 4 of the act were repealed by section 1 of, and schedule 1 to, the Statute Law Revision Act 1948 (11 & 12 Geo. 6. c. 62), which came into force on 30 July 1948.

Section 1 of the act, from "and shall never" onwards was repealed by section 13(2) of, and part I of schedule 4 to, the Criminal Law Act 1967, which came into force on 21 July 1967.

The whole act, so far as unrepealed, was repealed by section 1 of, and part II of the schedule to, the Statute Law (Repeals) Act 1969, which came into force on 1 January 1970.

== See also ==
- Marriage Act 1955, a New Zealand Act of Parliament which replaced provisions of the Ecclesiastical Licences Act 1536
