= Ifira =

Island in Shefa Province of Vanuatu

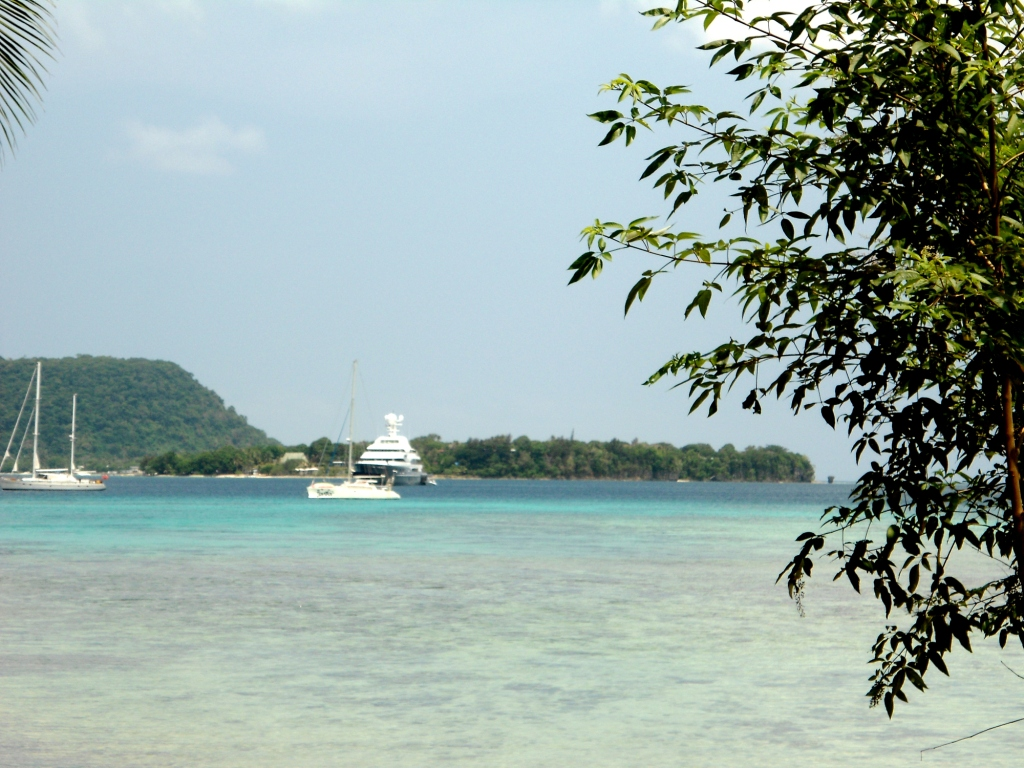
- A view on Ifira from Vila Bay (2011).
- Interactive map of Ifira

Geography
- Location: Pacific Ocean
- Coordinates: 17°45′00″S 168°17′00″E
- Archipelago: Vanuatu
- Area: 0.51 km^{2} (0.20 sq mi)
- Highest elevation: 20 m (70 ft)

Administration
- Vanuatu
- Province: Shefa Province

Demographics
- Population: 721 (2015)

Ifira is an offshore island of Efate, located in Shefa Province of Vanuatu in the Pacific Ocean.

== Geography ==
Ifira lies off the coast of Efate Island in Vila harbour. Ifira spans about 0.9 km (0.56 mi) from the north to the south and 0.9 km (0.56 mi) from the east to the west. The newly completed Lapetasi International Container Terminal is situated on the island. The estimated terrain elevation above the sea level is some 20 metres (66 ft).

== Population ==
As of 2015, the official local population was 721 people in 146 households. Local people speak the Mele-Ifira language (or Ifira-Mele), which is a Polynesian language also spoken in Mele and Efate.
