= Mele-Fila language =

Polynesian language

Mele-Fila
- Ifira-Mele
- Native to: Vanuatu
- Region: Efate, Ifira Island
- Native speakers: (3,500 cited 2001)
- Language family: Austronesian: Malayo-Polynesian; Oceanic; Polynesian; Futunic ?; Mele-Fila

Language codes
- ISO 639-3: mxe
- Glottolog: mele1250

Mele-Fila (Ifira-Mele) is a Polynesian language spoken in Mele and Ifira on the island of Efate in Vanuatu. In spite of their differences, Mele and Fila are two dialects of the same language and are mutually intelligible. French and English are also fairly common among the residents of Efate.

Mele-Fila is an everyday language for residents of Mele village and Fila Island. Mele village, with a population of 1,000, is located roughly 7 km (4.3 mi) north-west of Port Vila, the nation's capital. Fila Island, with a population of 400, is located about 1.5 km (0.93 mi) west of Vila.

== History ==
Based on archaeological evidence, it is understood that peoples speaking Austronesian languages originated on the island of Taiwan about 6,000 years ago. Some of their descendants formed the Lapita civilisation, who sailed to Remote Oceania, including Vanuatu, roughly 3,200 years ago.

The population of Mele-Fila belongs to the Polynesian outliers, who historically came from Central Polynesia (Tonga, Samoa) during the last two millennia.

== Phonology ==
Mele-Fila consonants
		Bilabial		Alveolar	Alveolo- palatal	Velar	Glottal
		Labio- velarized	plain	Alveolar	Alveolo- palatal	Velar	Glottal
Nasal		mʷ	m	n		ŋ	
Plosive		pʷ	p	t	t͡ɕ	k	
Fricative	voiceless		f	s			
Fricative	voiced		v				
Trill				r			
Approximant		w		l			h

This language is unusual among Polynesian languages for its phoneme /tɕ/ which historically represents *t palatalised before i, but now in contrast with t as a result of recent loanwords. In the Fila dialect, /p/ and /m/ are not distinct from their labialized counterparts.

Mele-Fila vowels
	Front	Central	Back
High	i		u
Mid	e		o
Low		a	

Mele vowels are similar to other Polynesian vowels as there are /i e a o u/ long and short. More than half of the words used in the language hail from Proto Polynesian language. Stressed initial vowels were kept, while unstressed initial vowels were removed.

"Ex: English: then, Mele: gafuru, PPN: aŋafulu"
"Ex: English: yesterday, Mele: nanafi, PPN: ananafi"

Articles and verbal particles with unstressed long vowels often have their unstressed vowel shortened:

Ex: ruú ́́are - "The two houses"
Ex: ru pókasi - "the two pigs"

Consonant clusters (strings of consonants without a vowel) exist, but can only be formed from these three combinations:

1. a sonorant and an obstruent
2. a fricative and a stop,
3. an obstruent and a nasal.

Word stress usually falls on the second-to-last syllable. Mele-Fila words usually contain at least three vowels. Similar to many Polynesian languages, this requires counting long vowels as two vowels.

Mele-Fila has borrowed significantly from the Efate languages of Vanuatu. It also borrowed from English and French via Bislama, one of Vanuatu's national languages and creole language. This has caused its syllable structure to allow (C)VC consonants as well as (C)V. Consonants can be geminated(vocally lengthened), which indicates that a noun is plural.

== Syntax ==
Mele-Fila has a Subject – Verb – Object sentence order.

== Verbal particles ==
Below is a list of "verbal particles":

- Ee – not of the future (past or current)
- Tee – intentional (could also mean immediate future)
- Too (roo in 3rd person) – future
- Kuu – indicates start or completion of an action/event
- Kaa – used when communicating to relatives below your social standing
- Kee (uncommon)- hypothetical
- Negation marker used post verb /kee/ (more common)
- Negation marker used pre-verb /see/ only used with ee or tee verbal particles
- Loose possession- used for actual ownership and some family relationships (possessed + n(a) + Possessor)
- Intimate possession – relation between parts/wholes and certain family relations
- Noki – frequent/habitual (always)
