= Recognition of same-sex unions in Oceania =

Recognition of same-sex relationships in Oceania Marriage Marriages performed elsewhere are recognized (American Samoa) No recognition of same-sex couples Constitution limits marriage to opposite-sex couples (Palau, Tuvalu) Same-sex sexual activity illegal, but criminalisation not enforced Same-sex sexual activity illegal (Country names will appear with mouse-overs when map is viewed at full size. Encircling lines are the exclusive economic zones of each state.)

Countries performing civil unions in Oceania Gender-neutral civil unions. Civil unions never performed.

Debate has occurred throughout Oceania over proposals to legalize same-sex marriage as well as civil unions.

Currently two countries and eight territories in Oceania recognize some type of same-sex unions. Two Oceanian countries, Australia and New Zealand, (Note: Excluding Tokelau, Niue and the Cook Islands.) and eight territories or states, namely Easter Island, French Polynesia, Guam, Hawaii, New Caledonia, the Northern Mariana Islands, the Pitcairn Islands and Wallis and Futuna allow same-sex couples to legally marry. In American Samoa, same-sex marriage is not performed, but same-sex marriages from other jurisdictions are recognized.

== Current situation ==
=== National level ===
Status	Country	Legal since	Country population (Last Census count)
Marriage (2 countries)	Australia	2017	24,754,000
Marriage (2 countries)	New Zealand	2013	4,840,750
Total	—	—	29,594,750 (80% of the Oceanian population)
No recognition (10 countries) * same-sex sexual activity illegal
No recognition (10 countries) * same-sex sexual activity illegal	Federated States of Micronesia	—	135,869
No recognition (10 countries) * same-sex sexual activity illegal	Fiji	—	856,346
No recognition (10 countries) * same-sex sexual activity illegal	Kiribati *	—	96,335
No recognition (10 countries) * same-sex sexual activity illegal	Marshall Islands	—	73,630
No recognition (10 countries) * same-sex sexual activity illegal	Nauru	—	12,329
No recognition (10 countries) * same-sex sexual activity illegal	Papua New Guinea *	—	5,172,033
No recognition (10 countries) * same-sex sexual activity illegal	Samoa *	—	179,000
No recognition (10 countries) * same-sex sexual activity illegal	Solomon Islands *	—	494,786
No recognition (10 countries) * same-sex sexual activity illegal	Tonga *	—	106,137
No recognition (10 countries) * same-sex sexual activity illegal	Vanuatu	—	240,000
Subtotal	—	—	7,366,465 (19.44% of the Oceanian population)
Constitutional ban on marriage ( 2 countries) * same-sex sexual activity illegal	Palau	2008	19,409
Constitutional ban on marriage ( 2 countries) * same-sex sexual activity illegal	Tuvalu *	2023	11,146
Subtotal	—	—	30,555 (0.1% of the Oceanian population)
Total	—	—	7,397,020 (20% of the Oceanian population)

=== Sub-national level ===
Status	Country	Jurisdiction	Legal since
Marriage (8 jurisdictions)
Marriage (8 jurisdictions)	Chile	Easter Island	2022
Marriage (8 jurisdictions)	France	New Caledonia; French Polynesia; Wallis and Futuna	2013
Marriage (8 jurisdictions)	United Kingdom	Pitcairn Islands	2015
Marriage (8 jurisdictions)	United States	Guam (2015); Hawaii (2013); Northern Mariana Islands (2015)	Varies
Recognizes marriages performed in other jurisdictions only (1 jurisdiction)	United States	American Samoa	2022
No recognition (3 jurisdictions)	New Zealand	Cook Islands; Niue; Tokelau	—

== Public opinion ==
Indicates the country/territory has legalized same-sex marriage nationwide
Indicates that same-sex marriage is legal in certain parts of the country
Indicates that the country has civil unions or registered partnerships
Indicates that same-sex sexual activity is illegal

Opinion polls for same-sex marriage by country
Country	Pollster	Year	For	Against	Neutral (Note: Also comprises other responses, including: Don't know; No answer; Other; Refused.)	Margin of error	Source
Australia	Ipsos	2023	63%	27% [16% support some rights]	10% not sure	±3.5%	
New Zealand	Ipsos	2023	70%	20% [11% support some rights]	9%	±3.5%	

Opinion polls for same-sex marriage by dependent territory and sub-national entities
Country	Pollster	Year	For	Against	Neutral	Margin of error	Source
Guam	University of Guam	2015	55%	29%	16%	-	

== See also ==
- LGBT rights in Oceania
- Australian Marriage Law Postal Survey
- Recognition of same-sex unions in Africa
- Recognition of same-sex unions in the Americas
- Recognition of same-sex unions in Asia
- Recognition of same-sex unions in Europe
