= Recognition of same-sex unions in Tuvalu =

Tuvalu does not recognise same-sex marriage, civil unions or any other form of recognition for same-sex couples. In 2023, the Constitution of Tuvalu was amended to ban same-sex marriage.

== Legal history ==
Recognition of same-sex relationships in Oceania Marriage Marriages performed elsewhere are recognized (American Samoa) No recognition of same-sex couples Constitution limits marriage to opposite-sex couples (Palau, Tuvalu) Same-sex sexual activity illegal, but criminalisation not enforced Same-sex sexual activity illegal (Country names will appear with mouse-overs when map is viewed at full size. Encircling lines are the exclusive economic zones of each state.)

=== Background ===
Tuvaluan law prohibits consensual, private sexual relations between men with up to fourteen years' imprisonment, although the law, introduced during the British colonial period, has never been enforced. While there is some protection from discrimination on the basis of sexual orientation, societal attitudes toward same-sex unions and homosexuality are generally negative.

=== Restrictions ===
The Marriage Act (Chapter 22.25; Tuvaluan: Tulafono Lasi i te Faiga o Āvaga, pronounced [tulaˈfono ˈlasi i te faˈiga o aːˈvaŋa]) does not expressly prohibit the recognition of same-sex unions. However, it generally refers to married spouses as "husband" and "wife". The act was amended in 2015 and 2021, but the Parliament of Tuvalu did not introduce an explicit definition of marriage or expressly ban same-sex marriages. Civil unions, which would offer some of the rights and benefits of marriage, are likewise not recognised in Tuvalu. As a result, same-sex couples do not have access to the legal rights, benefits and obligations of marriage, including protection from domestic violence, adoption rights, tax benefits and inheritance rights, among others.

The Constitution of Tuvalu previously did not define marriage as being between "a man and a woman". In July 2020, the Parliament established a committee tasked with modifying the Constitution. There were discussions on according legal rights to LGBT people, though the legalization of same-sex marriage was largely rejected as "taboo". A draft constitutional amendment, which would define marriage in heterosexual terms, was published on 12 December 2022. The amendments were approved unanimously by Parliament in September 2023, and went into force on 1 October 2023. Article 43(2) states:

Under this Constitution every person has the following fundamental duties and responsibilities to themselves, their dependents, and others [...] to uphold the Christian principles of a family unit, which shall comprise a marriage as between a man and a woman to the exclusion of all others, and their offspring as the foundation of the Tuvaluan society

== Historical and customary recognition ==
While there are no records of same-sex marriages being performed in Tuvaluan culture in the way they are commonly defined in Western legal systems, local communities recognize identities and relationships that may be placed on the LGBT spectrum. Similarly to many other Polynesian societies, Tuvalu recognises a third gender structure known as pinapinaaine (pronounced [pinapina.aˈine]; or pina for short). The term refers to individuals whose sex is assigned male at birth, but who embody female gendered behaviours. It is likely that "they have always existed" in Tuvalu, though their cultural role has been shaped by the Western introduction of "conservative Christian morality", leading pinapinaaine to experience social marginalisation and discrimination today. In Samoa, such individuals are known as faʻafafine and are considered an integral part of society. Historically, if they wished to marry and have children, they would marry women, thus creating the possibility for marriages between two female-presenting individuals to be performed in Samoan culture.

== Religious performance ==
The largest religious denomination in Tuvalu is the Church of Tuvalu, which accounts for about 86% of the population according to the 2022 census. The Church does not allow its ministers to officiate at same-sex marriages, though it has remained largely silent on the issue.

== See also ==
- LGBT rights in Tuvalu
- Recognition of same-sex unions in Oceania
