= Property (Relationships) Act 1976 =

Act of Parliament in New Zealand

New Zealand Parliament
- Long title: N/A
- Commenced: 1 February 1977

Legislative history
- Passed: 1976

Amended by
- The short title of this Act was amended, as from 1 February 2002, by s 5(2) of the Property (Relationships) Amendment Act 2001 (2001 No 5) by substituting the words "Property (Relationships)" for the words "Matrimonial Property". The Act is therefore confused by some as actually having been passed in 2001. In actuality the Matrimonial Property Act 1976 was renamed the Property (Relationships) Act 1976 as part of the 2001 amendments.

Related legislation
- Property (Relationships) Amendment Act 2001 (2001 No 5); Property (Relationships) Amendment Act 2005 (2005 No 19)
- Status: Current legislation

The Property (Relationships) Act 1976 is a New Zealand statute which primarily deals with the division of property of married couples, de facto couples and civil union couples when they separate or when one of them dies. In general, the couple's property is to be divided equally between them.

The Act was previously called the Matrimonial Property Act 1976 but amendments in 2001 changed the scheme of the Act considerably hence "Matrimonial Property" was replaced with "Property (Relationships)" in the short title. The 2001 amendments extended the property division regime in the Act to include heterosexual and homosexual de facto partners, making it one of the first New Zealand statutes to acknowledge same-sex relationships. In 2005 the Act was amended again to include civil union partners following commencement of the Civil Union Act 2004.

== Division of property ==
=== Equal sharing ===
According to section 11 of the Act, on the division of joint property under the Act, each of the spouses or partners is entitled to share equally in the family home, the family chattels, and any other relationship property. This statement stays true even if one of the spouse deceases by an accident, a long-term illness or even a murder by the other spouse. This section of the law was created in order to give equal rights to the stay-in-home side of the contribution with respect to the financial contribution i.e. childcare. Currently there are no further amendments to protect people from the abusers of the Act.

=== Relationship property and separate property ===
Section 8 and 9 of the Act specify what is relationship property and what is separate property for the purposes of the Act. Sometimes separate property can become relationship property and thus subject to equal sharing.

=== Exceptions to equal sharing ===
There are some statutory exceptions to the equal sharing presumption. For example, if the relationship is one of short duration as defined by the Act, the Court may divide the property other than equally.

==== Section 13 ====
Section 13 of the Act gives the Court discretion to depart from equal sharing if there are "extraordinary circumstances" which render equal sharing "repugnant to justice". The Court of Appeal has emphasised that this test is a stringent one:

"The phrase ‘extraordinary circumstances’ refers, I think, to circumstances that must not only be remarkable in degree but also be unusual in kind. It is vigorous and powerful language to find in any statute and I am satisfied that it has been chosen quite deliberately to limit the exception to those abnormal situations that will demonstrably seem truly exceptional and which by their nature are bound to be rare." Martin v Martin [1979] 1 NZLR 97 (CA), 102, per Woodhouse J.

If section 13 is satisfied the shares of the parties are determined in accordance with the contribution of each to the marriage partnership.

=== Compensating for economic disparities ===
Under section 15 of the Act, if at the end of the relationship the income and living standards of partner A are likely to be significantly higher than partner B as a consequence of the effects of the division of functions within the relationship, then the Court has power to make compensating orders. This provision has been referred to as the "stay-at-home spouse clause" and allows one partner to be awarded more than 50 percent of joint property to address the economic disparity created during the relationship.

== Contracting out agreements ==
If people have assets they wish to protect they can enter into a contracting-out agreement with their partner at the beginning of the relationship. The provisions in part 6 of the Act deal with contracting out of the Act so that the 50/50 split can be avoided. For contracting-out agreements to be watertight, they must be drafted in such a way as to allow for the creation of future property.
