= Constitution of the State of Yap =

Yap constitution

Constitution
- Signed: 1982
- Commenced: January 1, 1983
- Effective: December 24, 1982
- Status: Current legislation

The Constitution of the State of Yap, one of the four states of the Federated States of Micronesia, is the fundamental legal text of the State of Yap. It was adopted in 1982, promulgated on December 24 of the same year and came into force on January 1, 1983. Amendments were adopted by referendum and promulgated on November 24, 2006. The constitution comprises 15 articles. It can be consulted in English on the website of the Supreme Court of the Federated States of Micronesia.

== History of the Constitution ==
The constitution of Yap State is elaborated by a Constitutional Convention made up of delegates elected by the people. The resulting constitution was put to a referendum. It was adopted by a majority and promulgated on December 24, 1982. It came into force on January 1, 1983. The State of Yap was then a subdivision of the United States-administered Pacific Islands Trust Territory. Independence brought no changes to the constitution. Eleven amendments were proposed in 2004 by a constitutional convention. They were approved by the people on November 7, 2006 and certified by the Yap State Election Commissioner on November 24, 2006. An amendment to Article XIV of the constitution, by adding a Section 12, concerning the prohibition of gambling, was adopted by the legislature on May 14, 2014 (Resolution 8-102). As required by any attempt to amend the constitution, it was put to a referendum. The amendment was rejected on November 4, 2014, by 2545 votes to 2284.

== Structure of the Constitution ==
The Constitution as ratified on December 24, 1982, comprises, after a brief preamble, fifteen articles. Eleven amendments were made in 2006, without altering the number of articles. With the exception of Articles I and VIII, the articles are divided into sections. Some amendments modify the original text, while others add a new section. Articles I to VII define the basic structure of government.

=== Preamble and Article 1 ===
" We, the people of the State of Yap, desire to live in peace and harmony with one another, our neighbors and our environment. Recognize our traditional heritage and villages as the foundation of our society and economy. Realize our prosperity and welfare require an intelligent selection and integration of modern technology and institutions. Dedicate ourselves to govern our State, now and forever, for the general welfare of all generations to come. Do hereby ordain and establish this Constitution of the State of Yap."

=== Article I ===
Article I is a simple supremacy clause: "This Constitution is the supreme law of the State. An act of government in conflict with this Constitution is invalid to the extent of the conflict."

=== Article II: Fundamental rights ===
This Article II comprises thirteen sections whose content is almost identical to the US Constitution's Bill of Rights. Guaranteed rights include freedom of speech and of the press, and the separation of church and state. The constitution also guarantees citizens against unreasonable search and seizure, the right to due process and equal protection, the right to counsel and confrontation in criminal cases, as well as to a speedy and public trial, the right against self-incrimination, the right against excessive bail or cruel and unusual punishment. Article II guarantees the right to apply for a writ of habeas corpus, the prohibition of the enactment of laws that are retroactive or compromise contractual obligations, the prohibition of slavery, the right to just compensation in the event of expropriation, and the right to sue the government for damages. The last section reminds us that this enumeration cannot prohibit the existence of other rights for the population.

=== Traditional chiefs and customs ===
Nug boundaries of the Yap Islands with dashed village boundaries

The first section of Article III of the Yapese constitution, added by amendment in 2006, recognizes the role in traditions and customs of the Dalip pi Nguchol, the three supreme chiefs of the Yap islands, who own the three highest-ranking lands and under whose authority all the villages, with their own chiefs, are divided into three groups of nug. Traditionally, and as a consequence of the sawei hierarchical system, the Yap islands have always had a higher status than the outer Yap islands. To ensure that traditions and customs are respected and maintained, the second section of Article III of the constitution, since its promulgation in 1982, has formalized the existence of two councils of chiefs: one for the chiefs of the municipalities of the Yap islands, the Pilung council, and the other for the chiefs of the municipalities of the outer Yap islands, the Tamol council.

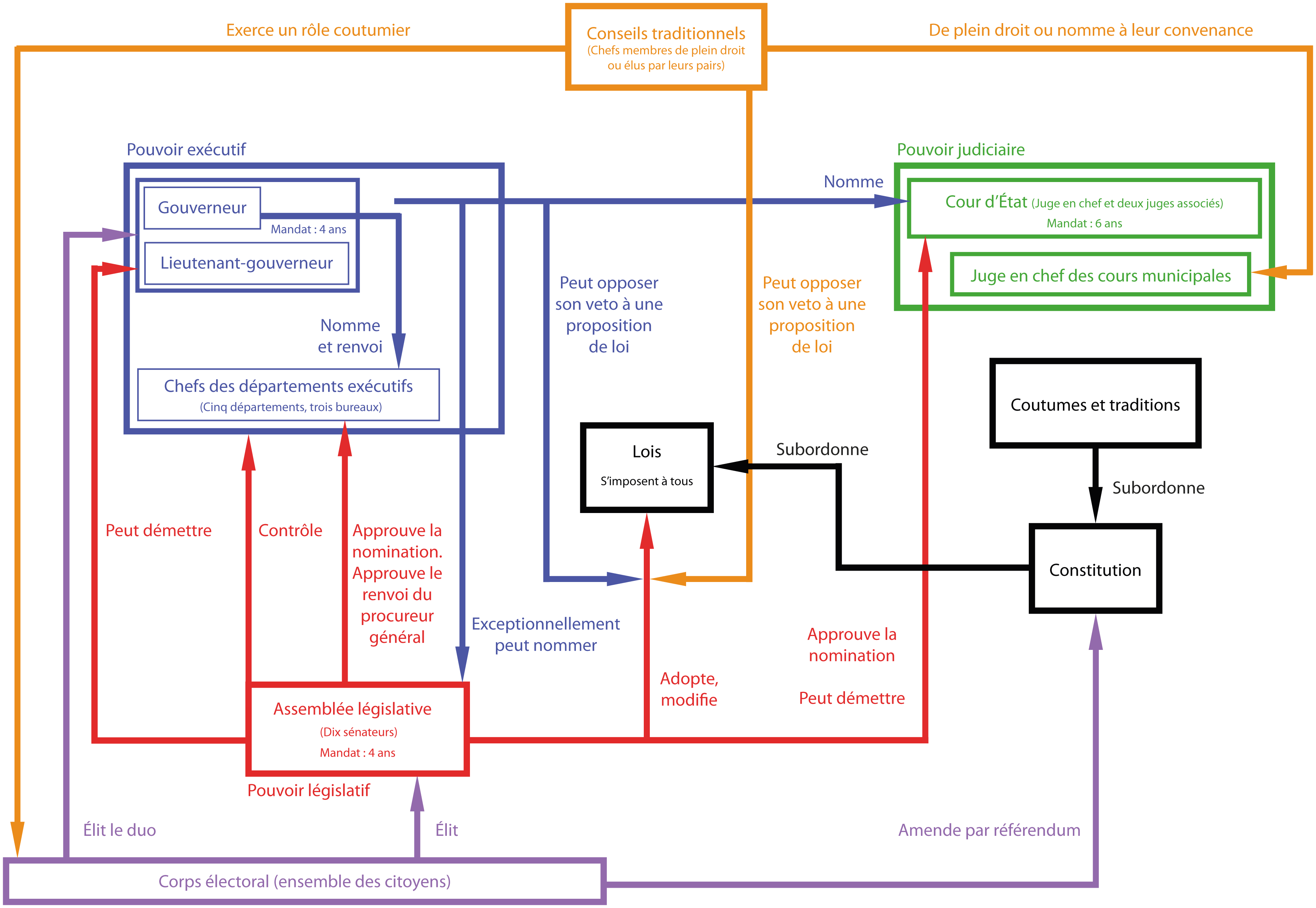
The four institutional powers of Yap State

Sections 16 to 18 of Article V of the constitution empower the councils to perform functions relating to tradition and custom in the state, and to review and disapprove an act of the Yap State legislature if, in their opinion, it violates custom and tradition. These are not codified but transmitted orally. According to Tina Takashy, in the household context, this can lead to abuses and violations of human rights when the aim is to ensure the protection of social cohesion and harmony and common survival. The first section of Article XV provides for the possibility of codifying traditional laws. The right of veto, which councils use sparingly, cannot be overridden. The legislator, if he wishes to continue the legislative process, must incorporate the objections into the bill, send it back to the assembly for consideration and then, if adopted, back to the councils for approval. To avoid deadlock, bills may be submitted for prior reading by the councils. In 1982, during the Yap Constitutional Convention, the right of veto, inherited from the 1978 Yap District Charter, was the subject of intense debate. The convention's Standing Committee, the proposing authority, rejected it in favor of a text requiring that only bills relating to custom and tradition be forwarded to the Councils, and that they should only be able to comment on, not disapprove, a bill. Convention delegates rejected this recommendation.

The third section of Article III specifies that nothing in the Constitution shall be construed as limiting or invalidating any recognized tradition or custom. Custom and tradition take precedence over any statute, any interpretation of the Constitution, and even over any judicial decision. For attorney-at-law Brian Z. Tamanaha, "unlike the other three branches, however, councils transcend the concept of separation of powers by exercising functions that are quasi-legislative, quasi-executive and judicial, not to mention chiefly".

=== Article IV: Elections ===
Article IV establishes the conditions for voting. Any citizen who is 18 years of age, registered on the electoral roll, has fulfilled the minimum period of residence and has not been disbarred by a court conviction, mental incapacity or insanity is entitled to vote. The State must prescribe by law the method of voting and provide the means necessary for the organization of suffrage and the secrecy of the vote. General elections are held every four years on the first Tuesday following the first Monday in November of an even-numbered year. Exceptional circumstances may postpone the election for up to 60 days. Special elections may be held in accordance with the law. In the event of a tie between the two candidates with the most votes, a run-off election must be held to break the tie.

Article XI defines the electoral districts in which members of the Legislative Assembly are elected. The first electoral district is that of the Yap Islands archipelago, and must have six elected members. The other four districts have only one elected member. The second electoral district comprises the atolls of Ulithi, Fais Island, Sorol Atoll and Ngulu Atoll. The third district is Woleai atoll. The fourth district covers Eauripik atoll, Faraulep atoll and Ifalik atoll. The fifth district covers Satawal island, Lamotrek atoll and Elato atoll. These districts are to be updated every 10 years by the Assembly. The Assembly must ensure that the population is approximately equal per elected representative, taking into account the social and geographical configuration of the state.

=== The Legislative Assembly and customary law ===
Article V concerns the Legislative Assembly, vested with the legislative power of the State. It is composed of ten members, at least 25 years of age, citizens of the Federated States of Micronesia for at least ten years, residents of the State for at least five years and of the electoral district for which they are running, and where they have been registered on the electoral rolls, for at least the year immediately preceding the filing of their candidacy. They must not have been convicted of a crime, unless they have received a pardon restoring their rights. Each member is elected at a general election in an electoral district as defined in Article XI of the Constitution. Their term of office begins at noon on the second Monday in January after the general election and ends at noon on the second Monday in January, four years later. In the event of a vacancy occurring less than a year before the end of the term, the Governor will fill the vacancy by appointment. Otherwise, a special election is held.

Elected representatives receive a salary prescribed by law. Any increase in salary voted by law becomes effective only after the end of their term of office. Elected officials may not, for one year after the end of their term of office, apply for a job or public office created or whose salary will have been increased during their term of office by legislative act. Except in cases of crime or breach of the peace, elected representatives may not be arrested. They are not answerable for statements or actions taken in the exercise of their functions. A member of the Assembly may be punished by censure or, by a vote of two-thirds of the members, by suspension or expulsion.

The management of day-to-day business requires the presence of two-thirds of the Assembly. A majority of votes is sufficient to pass a bill or resolution, except for its final approval, in which case a vote of one-third of the members is required. A bill must go through two readings in the Legislative Assembly on different days. Once passed, it is forwarded to the Pilung Council and the Tamol Council for review. If they consider that the bill negatively affects tradition and custom, or the role or function of a traditional leader as recognized by tradition and custom, they bring the negative effects to the attention of the Assembly within thirty days. A disapproved bill can be amended to meet the Councils' objections, and if it is amended and passed, only one reading is required. It is then resubmitted to the Councils. A bill that has passed the scrutiny of the traditional chiefs is forwarded to the Governor. He has ten or thirty days, depending on the situation, to examine the bill presented to him. After this period, the bill becomes law. The Governor signs it if he approves the bill, which then becomes law. The Governor may veto a bill in its entirety. In the case of a bill providing for public expenditure, he may veto one or more items of expenditure, by deleting or modifying them. The uncensored parts become law. If the Assembly accepts the amended parts, a single reading with two-thirds of the votes cast leads to its adoption. If the bill is amended by the Assembly, it is sent back to the Governor, who may or may not sign it.

In the event of embezzlement, misfeasance or conviction of a felony, the Governor, Lieutenant-Governor or a State Court judge may be removed from office by a three-quarters vote of the members of the Legislative Assembly.

=== Executive power ===
Sections 1 to 5 of Article VI define the positions of Governor and Lieutenant-Governor. The executive power of the state is exercised by the Governor, in conjunction with a Lieutenant-Governor. Their salaries are prescribed by law, and may only be increased or decreased by a general law applying to salaried employees of the state government. If the applicant for governor is a resident of the Yap Islands, the applicant for lieutenant-governor will be a resident of the Outer Yap Islands, and if the governor is a resident of the Outer Yap Islands, the lieutenant-governor will be a resident of the Yap Islands. The Duo is elected by the voters of the state in a general election, for a four-year term, renewable consecutively once. To be eligible, one must be at least thirty years of age, be a citizen of the Federated States of Micronesia by birth, have been a resident of the state for at least fifteen years and during the five years preceding the filing of the candidacy, be a person eligible to vote in the state, and never have been convicted of a felony unless granted a pardon restoring civil rights. The person receiving the greatest number of votes, and at least forty-five percent of the votes cast, is elected governor. If this quota is not reached, the two duos with the highest number of votes participate in a special election.

The Governor may not hold any other public office or employment during his term of office. The Lieutenant-Governor may be appointed by the Governor to head an executive department established by law, and may assume such other responsibilities as may be assigned by the Governor or prescribed by law. In the event of the Governor's absence or inability to perform or discharge his duties, the Lieutenant-Governor shall act in his stead. If the Lieutenant-Governor is unable to act, the head of one of the principal departments shall exercise the powers and perform the duties of the office of Governor. If the offices of Governor and Lieutenant-Governor are vacant, the President of the Legislative Assembly shall succeed to the office of Governor.

The Governor is responsible for the faithful execution of the laws. He may grant reprieves and pardons, commutations, after conviction, subject to regulations established by law, except in cases of impeachment. No reprieve, commutation or pardon may be granted to a person holding the office of Lieutenant-Governor or Governor. The Governor shall report annually to the Legislative Assembly, by message, the condition of the State, and shall in like manner recommend such measures as he may deem advisable.

Article VI, Section 8 establishes that the executive and administrative offices, departments and institutions of the State and government, as well as their respective functions, powers and rights, shall be established by law. Each principal department is under the supervision of the Governor and is headed by a single director, unless otherwise provided by law. He is designated and appointed by the Governor, with the advice and consent of the Legislative Assembly, to serve at the Governor's pleasure during his term of office. Only the dismissal of the Attorney General is subject to the advice and consent of the Legislative Assembly. The appointment of members of the boards of regulatory or quasi-judicial bodies is subject to the advice and consent of the Legislative Assembly. The term of office and dismissal of members is laid down by law.

Section 9 allows the Governor to declare a state of emergency for up to 30 days to preserve the public peace, health or safety, at a time of extreme emergency caused by civil unrest, natural disaster, or the immediate threat of war or insurrection. A state of emergency cannot interfere with judicial power, but remains free from judicial interference for fifteen days after its first publication. It may interfere with a civil right to the extent really necessary for the preservation of peace, health or security. The state of emergency may be extended: within thirty days of the declaration of emergency, the Legislative Assembly must respond to the Speaker's or Governor's call to consider the revocation, modification or extension of the declaration. Unless it expires by its own terms, is revoked or extended, a declaration of emergency is effective for thirty days.

=== Article 7: Judicial power ===
Section 2 was modified by a constitutional amendment adopted by Yap State voters on November 7, 2006, and certified by the Yap State Election Commissioner on November 24, 2006. The amendment was defined in proposed law no. 2004-38, D1 of the 2004 Yap Constitutional Convention. The added portion is underlined.

Section 1. The judicial power of the State shall be exercised by the State Court, and by such other courts as may be created by law.

Section 2. The State Court is the highest court of the State and consists of a Chief Justice and two Associate Justices. The number of associate judges may be increased by law at the request of the State Court. Retired State Court judges, or other persons educated or experienced in the law, may serve temporarily on the State Court at the request of the Chief Justice. The Chief Justice may give a special assignment to a person to serve as Associate Justice for a specific case. In the event of vacancy of the Chief Justice, or if he is ill, absent or unable to act, an Associate Justice shall serve temporarily in his stead.

Section 3. The Governor shall designate and appoint, with the advice and consent of the Legislative Assembly, the Chief Justice and Associate Justices of the State Court. The judges of the State Court shall hold office for a term of six years.

Section 4. Compensation of State Court Judges to be provided by law. Their compensation shall not be diminished during their respective terms of office, except by general law applying to salaried employees of the State Government.

Section 5. Courts shall have a court of first instance and a court of appeal as prescribed by law.

Case Annotations: A provision of a state statute which attempts to place the phrase "exclusive jurisdiction" in the statutes of the Yap State Court cannot take away from a national court responsibilities imposed upon it by the national constitution, which is the "supreme law of the Federated States of Micronesia." Gimnang v. Yap, 5 FSM Intrm. 13,23 (App. 1991). A state law cannot relieve the Supreme Court of the Federated States of Micronesia of its exclusive jurisdiction in cases falling under art. XI, § 6 (a) of the Constitution of the Federated States of Micronesia. Faw v. FSM, 6 FSM Intrm. 33, 36-37 (Yap 1993).

Section 6. The State Court shall establish and promulgate rules governing practice and procedure in civil and criminal cases, which shall have the force and effect of law, provided that the Legislature may create or modify such rules by law. The State Court is a court of record.

Section 7. The decisions of the Court shall be consistent with this Constitution, the traditions and customs of the State, and the social and geographical configuration of the State.

=== Article 9: Taxes and finance ===
Section 9 was added by a constitutional amendment adopted by Yap State voters on November 7, 2006, and certified by the Yap State Election Commissioner on November 24, 2006. The amendment was defined in Proposition Law No. 2004-51, D2 of the 2004 Yap Constitutional Convention.

Section 1. The power of taxation must never be surrendered, suspended or contracted continuously.

Section 2. No taxes shall be levied or appropriated public funds or public property transferred, except for public purposes.

Section 3. The property of the state government or its political subdivisions shall be exempt from taxation.

Section 4. The power of taxation shall be reserved to the State Government, except where it may be delegated by the Legislature to local governments; provided that the State Government may not tax real property. The Legislative Assembly may apportion state revenues among local governments.

Section 5. The Legislative Assembly shall not appropriate funds in excess of estimated available revenues.

Section 6. No money shall be withdrawn from the State Treasury, nor held in obligation, except in accordance with law.

Section 7. The Governor shall submit to the Legislature a budget setting forth a complete plan of the proposed expenditures and revenues anticipated for the state government, together with such other information as the Legislature may require. The budget shall be presented in a written document, at one time, and for the fiscal years prescribed by law.

The Governor shall also submit bills to provide for proposed expenditures and for any additional revenues recommended within a time prescribed by law.

Section 8. there shall be regular and independent audits of state agencies and revenues.

Section 9. The state shall conduct regular public oversight hearings of state agencies and revenues.

=== Article 10: Amendment ===
Section 1. An amendment to this Constitution may be proposed by a Constitutional Convention. At least every ten years, the Legislature shall submit to the voters the question, "Shall there be a Convention to amend the Constitution?" If a majority of the votes cast on the question are in the affirmative, delegates to the Convention shall be chosen no later than the next regular election in the State.

Section 2. An amendment to this constitution may be proposed by popular initiative. An initiative is proposed by a petition containing the proposed amendment. The petition must be signed by at least twenty-five percent of the registered voters and filed with the Governor, who shall certify its validity.

Section 3. The Legislative Assembly may propose an amendment to this constitution by passing a resolution by a three-fourths vote of the members of the Legislative Assembly.

Section 4. At a general or special election, or referendum, a proposed amendment shall be submitted to the electorate for approval or rejection in a separate ballot. A proposed amendment becomes part of the Constitution when approved by a majority of the votes cast.

Section 5. The Legislature shall appropriate funds and enact laws necessary to implement this Article.

=== Article 12: Health and education ===
Section 3 was added by a constitutional amendment adopted by Yap State voters on November 7, 2006, and certified by the Yap State Election Commissioner on November 24, 2006. The amendment was defined in Proposition No. 2004-47, D3 of the 2004 Yap Constitutional Convention.

Section 1. The State Government shall provide for the protection and promotion of public health, which may include the traditional practice of medicine.

Section 2. The State Government shall provide public education and schools. Public elementary education shall be free. The traditions and customs of the people of this State shall be taught in public schools as provided by law.

Section 3. Standards for education in the State of Yap shall be prescribed by law.

=== Article 13: Resource conservation and development ===
Sections 1 and 2 were modified by a constitutional amendment adopted by the voters of Yap State on November 7, 2006, and certified by the Yap State Election Commissioner on November 24, 2006. The amendment to Sections 1 and 5 was set forth in Proposition Law No. 2004-39, D1 of the Yap Constitutional Convention of 2004, and the amendment to Section 2 in Proposition Law No. 2004-14, D1. Removed portions are in [square brackets], added portions are underlined.

Section 1. The State Government [shall promote] may ensure the protection, conservation and sustainable development of agriculture, fisheries, mineral resources, forestry, water, land and other natural resources.

Section 2. An agreement for the use of land where one of the parties is not a citizen of the Federated States of Micronesia or a corporation wholly owned by one of its citizens shall not exceed a term of [fifty] one hundred years. The Legislature may prescribe a lesser term.

Section 3. Title to land may be acquired only in a manner consistent with tradition and custom.

Section 4. Radioactive and nuclear substances shall not be tested, stored, used or disposed of in the State.

Section 5. The State recognizes the traditional rights and ownership of the natural resources and maritime space of the State from the high water mark [inland] and up to 12 miles from the baseline of the islands. No action may be taken to interfere with traditional and property rights, except as the State government may provide for the conservation and sustainable development [protection] of natural resources in the State's maritime space from the high waterline [inland] and up to 12 miles from the base line of the islands.

Section 6. A foreign fishery, research or exploration vessel shall not take the natural resources of any area within the maritime space of the State, except as permitted by the appropriate persons exercising traditional rights and by property and law.

=== Article 14: General terms and conditions ===
Sections 1 and 2 were modified by a constitutional amendment adopted by Yap State voters on November 7, 2006, and certified by the Yap State Election Commissioner on November 24, 2006. The modification of Section 1 was defined in Proposition Law No. 2004-76, D2 of the Yap Constitutional Convention of 2004 and the addition of Section 10 in Proposition Law No. 2004-76, D2. Removed portions are in [square brackets], added portions are underlined.

Section 1. Colonia is the state capital, unless otherwise specified by law. The Legislature shall provide for the designation and demarcation of the boundary of the state capital.

Section 2. There shall be a system of civil service for state government, which shall be based on principles of merit.

Section 3. All public officers, before assuming the duties of their office, shall take and subscribe the following oath or affirmation: "I do solemnly swear that I will support and defend the Constitution of the State of Yap, and that I will faithfully discharge my duties as (name of job) to the best of my ability, with the help of God." The legislature may prescribe other oaths or affirmations.

Section 4. No person shall receive, use, or enjoy any government income, property, or service for personal account or gain, except as permitted by law.

Section 5. The indigenous languages of the State and English shall be the official languages.

Section 6. The meaning of any provision of this Constitution shall be determined in accordance with the intent of the delegates.

Section 7. The people may pass, amend or repeal laws by popular initiative. A popular initiative petition must contain the full text of the proposed law, amendment or law to be repealed and must be signed by at least twenty-five percent of the registered voters of the state. A popular initiative petition must be filed with the Attorney General for certification. A popular initiative petition certified by the Attorney General must be submitted to the voters at the next general election and becomes effective if approved by a majority of the votes cast for the initiative.

Section 8. A citizen of the Federated States of Micronesia whose domicile is in the State is a citizen of the State.

Section 9. The Governor, Lieutenant-Governor or a member of the Legislative Assembly may be removed by recall. A recall is initiated by a petition which identifies the official sought to be recalled by name and office, states the reasons for the recall, and must be signed by at least twenty-five percent of those eligible to vote for the office held by the official. A special recall election must be held no later than sixty calendar days after the filing of the recall petition. An official shall be removed from office only with the approval of a majority of those voting in the election. A recall petition may not be filed against an officer more than once per quarter or during the first year of a term.

Section 10. Mentally handicapped persons shall be accommodated as provided by law.

ARTICLE XV, Section 9. The Legislature shall adopt official translations of this Constitution.

== See also ==
- Yap
- Oceania
