= Kaleidoscope Australia Human Rights Foundation =

Kaleidoscope Human Rights Foundation
- Formation: 16 September 2013; 13 years ago
- Legal status: Not-for-profit organisation
- Purpose: LGBTIQIA+ rights
- Location(s): Melbourne & Sydney, Australia
- Region served: Asia Pacific
- Website: www.kaleidoscopehrf.org

Kaleidoscope Human Rights Foundation (previously known as "Kaleidoscope Australia Human Rights Foundation") is a non-governmental organisation based in Australia that works to protect the rights of LGBTQIA+ people in the Asia Pacific region.

== Objectives ==
The objective of the organisation lies in "promoting and protecting the human rights of bisexual, transgender, intersex and queer people in the Asia Pacific region". Kaleidoscope "works directly with local activists to enhance their capacity to combat prejudice, hostile authorities, and discriminatory laws, helping them achieve the freedom and equality essential to living a life of dignity".

== History ==
Kaleidoscope Human Rights Foundation was founded in September 2013 and was inspired by its sister organisation, The Kaleidoscope Trust in the UK. Professor Paula Gerber, then Deputy Director of the Castan Centre for Human Rights Law at Monash University, was the inaugural president of the organisation. Between 2017-2023, the Board was Chaired by Raymond Roca. In 2024, Professor Paula Gerber returned as Chair of the Board of Directors.

Former Justice of the High Court of Australia, Michael Kirby is the patron of the organisation.

== Advocacy ==
Kaleidoscope Human Rights Foundation has a particular focus on submitting Alternative Reports ("previously known as Shadow Reports") to UN treaty committees and also to the UN Human Rights Council. The intention is to ensure that every national review by UN committees and the Council includes an examination of the human rights of sexual and gender minorities as well as wider human rights issues. To date, Alternative Reports to Human Rights Committees have been prepared for dozens of countries in within the Asia Pacific, including Nepal, Cambodia, Japan, Sri Lanka, Mongolia and many more. The Melbourne office of international law firm DLA Piper assists in the research and drafting of these reports. These reports have proven to be impactful in encouraging State reforms on LGBTQIA+ policies, one example is the Alternative Reports on Sri Lanka may have spurred the government there to move its position.

Kaleidoscope also publishes a range of Guides to using UN Human Rights Treaties to protect LGBTQIA+ rights. To date, three Guides have been published and used by NGOs and governments, including "Looking through the Kaleidoscope: A Guide to Best Practice in Determining Applications for Refugee Status based on Sexual Orientation, Gender Identity and Intersex Grounds" (published in 2016), "Using the ICESCR to Protect the Economic, Social and Cultural Rights of LGBTI People - A Practical Guide" (published in 2018), and most recently "Best Practice Guide: CEDAW as a Tool to Protect the Rights of Trans Women" (published in 2024, in collaboration with international law firm King & Wood Mallesons).

Kaleidoscope also keeps up lines of communication with the Australian government over issues relating to Australia's foreign relations with regional nations over their record on the human rights of sexual or gender minorities. During the election campaign in 2013, KHRF ran a pledge campaign to get the political parties in Australia committed to LGBTI rights in foreign policy. They were successful in getting the Greens, Labor and the Liberal candidate in Melbourne Ports, Kevin Ekendahl, to sign the pledge. In November 2013, Kaleidoscope Australia was also one of almost 20 groups across the Commonwealth that participated in and helped publish the "Speaking Out" report on Homophobia in the Commonwealth that had been coordinated and compiled by the Kaleidoscope Trust.
