= Marriage in New Zealand =

Marriage rates in New Zealand from 1961 to 2014.

Marriage in New Zealand is governed by an Act of Parliament. The minimum marriage age is 18 years, or 16 years with consent of the Family Court. Polygamous marriages are not permitted in New Zealand. There are prohibitions of marriages between some relatives and some who are already in a civil union.

There has been a steady reduction in the number of registered marriages since the 1970s and there has been a shift in the age of marriage. Teenage brides made up 32 percent of all brides in 1971, compared with just 3 percent in 1999.

Before 1976 the majority of marriages in New Zealand were performed by ministers of religion in a church with the remainder performed by a registrar in a registry office. From 1976, the Marriage Amendment Act 1976 allowed for marriages to be performed by celebrants from approved organisations and by independent marriage celebrants in addition to ministers of religion (now known as religious organisation marriage celebrants). The percentage of marriages performed by religious celebrants has steadily declined since 1976.

== Marriage celebrants ==
Marriages in New Zealand are solemnised by marriage celebrants where a marriage celebrant may be a minister of religion of a specified religious body, a marriage celebrant of an approved organisation, or an independent marriage celebrant.

Before 1976 there was growing dissatisfaction with the Marriage Act as it restricted people to choose between a Christian marriage that was usually performed in a church and solemnised by an Officiating Minister, or to a secular marriage in a Registry office where the number of guests was very restricted. From 1973 the Humanist Society of New Zealand lobbied the government for a change to the Marriage Act seeking the right of people to have marriage ceremonies of their choice with a celebrant of their choice held in a place of their choice.

In 1976, The Marriage Act Amendment Act 1976 replaced the words "officiating minister" in the 1955 Marriage Act with "marriage celebrant" and allowed for marriages to be performed by organisational and independent marriage celebrants in addition to religious organisational marriage celebrants. The Humanist Society was the first organisation to have a nominee registered under the amended Act and a Humanist marriage celebrant was appointed in Auckland. The Humanist Society followed with the appointment of further Humanist celebrants in Auckland and at various locations throughout New Zealand. Other secular organisations followed and registered their own celebrants and the number of independent celebrants also increased steadily.

Since 1976, the percentage of marriages performed by religious celebrants has declined steadily. In 1995 there were 1,543 civil celebrants officially registered in New Zealand and 38% of all marriages were solemnised by civil celebrants and 18% by Registrars – a total of 56% of all marriages.

In 2015 there were 22,800 registered marriages, and 9,867 official celebrants; 3,996 religious organisational celebrants, 3,424 organisational celebrants, and 2,447 approved independent celebrants. Independent celebrants performed 52% of marriages and registrars 22%, giving a total of 74% of all marriages. Religious and approved organisational celebrants together performed 26% of marriages.

== Same-sex marriage ==
Same-sex marriage is permitted in New Zealand as of 19 August 2013. However, Civil unions have been legal in New Zealand since 26 April 2005. The Civil Union Act 2004 to establish the institution of civil union for same-sex and opposite-sex couples was passed by the Parliament on 9 December 2004. The Act has been described as very similar to the Marriage Act 1955 with references to "marriage" replaced by "civil union". A companion bill, the Relationships (Statutory References) Act, was passed shortly thereafter on 15 March 2005, to remove discriminatory provisions on the basis of relationship status from a range of statutes and regulations. As a result of these bills, all couples in New Zealand, whether married, in a civil union, or in a de facto partnership, now generally enjoy the same rights and undertake the same obligations. These rights extend to immigration, next-of-kin status, social welfare, matrimonial property and other areas. Non-married couples are not however permitted to adopt children, although people in non-marital relationships can adopt as individuals.

In 2005, United Future Member of Parliament (MP) Gordon Copeland sponsored the Marriage (Gender Clarification) Amendment Bill that would have amended the Marriage Act to define marriage as only between a man and a woman, and amend anti-discrimination protections in the Bill of Rights related to marital and family status so that the bill could stand. This move was strongly criticised by opponents of the legislation, such as then-Attorney General Michael Cullen as an overly 'radical' attack on the Bill of Rights. The bill also would have prohibited the recognition of same-sex marriages from foreign countries as marriages in New Zealand. The bill had its first reading debate on 7 December 2005, and subsequently failed 47 votes in favour to 73 votes against.

In May 2012, Labour Party MP Louisa Wall stated that she would introduce a private member's bill, the Marriage (Definition of Marriage) Amendment Bill, allowing same-sex couples to marry. The bill was submitted to the members' bill ballot on 30 May 2012. Green Party MP Kevin Hague also submitted a same-sex marriage bill, the Marriage (Equality) Amendment Bill, to the ballot on 24 June Wall and Hague stated that they planned to work together in support of whichever bill came up first, and in July Wall's bill was drawn from the ballot.

The Marriage (Definition of Marriage) Amendment Act 2013 amended the Marriage Act 1955 from 19 August 2013 to include a definition of marriage that explicitly allows same-sex marriages.

== Polygamy ==
Polygamy existed in pre-European Māori society to a limited extent.

Polygamous marriages may not be performed in New Zealand. Section 205 of the Crimes Act 1961 provides a two to seven year imprisonment term for bigamy for a person who enters into a formal marriage or civil union recognised by New Zealand law with a third person when they are already married or in a civil union recognised by New Zealand law. Section 205 includes civil unions, which have been legal in New Zealand since 2005, and same-sex marriages, which have been legal since 2013.

However, polygamous marriages legally performed in another country can be recognised in New Zealand, provided that no person involved was living in New Zealand at the time of the union.

Advocacy for full legalisation of polygamy in New Zealand has come from some religious organisations and from polyamorous groups. However, polygamy has little public support among New Zealanders, and no major political party has endorsed its legalisation.

== Marriage between relatives ==
Under Schedule 2 of the Marriage Act 1955, no person may marry the following relatives:

- grandparent
- parent
- child
- grandchild
- sibling (half or full)
- parent's sibling
- sibling's child
- grandparent's former spouse or civil union partner
- parent's former spouse or civil union partner
- child's former spouse or civil union partner
- grandchild's former spouse or civil union partner
- former spouse's or civil union partner's grandparent
- former spouse's or civil union partner's parent
- former spouse's or civil union partner's child
- former spouse's or civil union partner's grandchild

== Māori marriages ==
Māori society had no formal marriage rite as such, but family approval was required and marriages are still discussed at hui. Maori custom marriages were recognised as legal until 1888. However, although there was some doubt about the validity of such marriages after a Supreme Court, now the High Court, decision in 1888, they continued to be used until the 1950s. From 1888, parliament continued to recognise custom marriages in legislation while the courts sometimes did not, creating a contradictory system.

Māori were not mentioned in the Marriage Act of 1842 and were exempted from the provisions of the Marriage Acts of 1847, 1854, 1880, 1904, and 1908, but from 1854 allowed to marry under the provisions of the Acts if they so desired. From 1854, the Governor General could proclaim districts where the Act would apply to Māori marriages.

The Marriage Act 1955 makes no special provisions or exemptions for Māori. However, the Births, Deaths, Marriages, and Relationships Registration Act 1995 requires that all information relating to a Maori custom marriage be recorded in a manner that allows it to be clearly ascertained that the marriage was a Maori custom marriage while other provisions of the same act make no special provision for Maori custom marriages and require that for any marriage to be registered, forms supplied to the Registrar must be signed by each spouse, the celebrant, and two witnesses.

== Age of consent to marriage ==
English common law applicable in New Zealand from 1840 allowed girls to marry at 12, and boys at 14, however, such young marriages were rare and persons under the age of twenty-one required the consent of their father, guardian in the absence of a father, or mother in the absence of a father or guardian. In 1933, the minimum age of marriage for both men and women was raised to 16 with the consent of a parent or guardian required for those under 21. Following the passing of the Age of Majority Act 1970 those over 20 did not require the consent of a parent or guardian from 1 January 1971. Consent of a parent or guardian was subsequently restricted to those aged 16 or 17 by the Marriage Amendment Act 2005 and from 14 August 2018, the consent of a parent or guardian was replaced with the consent of a Family Court Judge in order to prevent forced marriages.

== Forced marriage ==
In some cultures, the tradition of forced marriage is practised and this occurs to a small degree in New Zealand. One women's support organisation reported that forced marriage makes up half of their youth work and one worker had 50 such cases over a four-year period.

In 2012, a private member's bill, the Marriage (Court Consent to Marriage of Minors) Amendment Bill, was submitted by National Party MP Jackie Blue to address the problem of forced marriages of 16- and 17-year-olds. There are about 80 applications per year for marriages between 16- and 17-year-olds. After Blue left Parliament, the bill was picked up by fellow National MP Jo Hayes and was eventually drawn from the ballot on 13 April 2017.

The bill proposed that 16 and 17-year-olds who wish to marry must apply to the Family Court for the consent of a Family Court Judge, in place of consent from a parent or guardian, and set out how the court is to consider the application. At the Select Committee stage, the bill was broadened to cover civil unions and de facto relationships in addition to marriages, and was subsequently retitled the Minors (Court Consent to Relationships) Legislation Bill. The bill passed its third reading on 8 August 2018, received Royal Assent on 13 August, and came into force on 14 August 2018.

== Legislation ==
Marriages in New Zealand are allowed between any two people regardless of their sex, sexual orientation, or gender identity. Marriages must be solemnised in the presence of a Marriage Celebrant or Registrar, except for Quaker marriages, and two or more witnesses within three months of the issue of a licence and may take place at any time of the day and at any place stated on the marriage licence. The presence of a Marriage Celebrant entitled under the Marriage Act to act as a Marriage Celebrant is required at all marriages other than Quaker marriages to ensure that the requirements of the Marriage Act are met. During the solemnisation of every marriage each party must say to the other—“I AB, take you CD, to be my legal wife or husband”; or words to similar effect; or the words required by a specified body in the case of the solemnisation of a marriage in accordance with the rules and procedures of a specified body that requires different words to be used as a marriage vow.

=== Historical background ===
Colonial New Zealand marriage law was initially governed by English common law as the English Marriage Act 1753 and Marriage Act 1836 did not apply in New Zealand. The first New Zealand Marriage Act was the Marriage Validation Act 1842. The Marriage Act 1847, based on the English Marriage Acts and practice, was the first Act to govern aspects of marriage in New Zealand. It was followed by the Marriage Acts of 1854, 1880, 1904 (Marriage Act Compilation Act 1904), 1908, and 1955 and various amendments. The Marriage Act 1955 as amended is the current legislation.

English law applied in New Zealand from 1840. Before 1842, doubts were expressed regarding the validity of marriages in New Zealand. Maori had their own marriage practices and immigrants to New Zealand from England, Scotland, Ireland, and other countries were of various Christian denominations, other religions, and non-believers. The immigrants brought with them a variety of marriage practices. Marriages were performed by officiating ministers of various denominations while other people simply declared themselves married. All marriages were considered common-law marriages under English common law but doubts arose because common law marriages were not recognised in England and Wales following the 1753 English Marriage Act, the first statutory legislation in England and Wales to require a formal ceremony of marriage.

The purpose and full title of the controversial 1753 English Act was "An Act for the Better Preventing of Clandestine Marriage" where an irregular or clandestine marriage was a marriage that was usually performed by ordained clergy but performed in a parish other than the home parish of those intending to marry and sometimes with no banns or marriage licence issued by the church. These marriages were however legally recognised and binding and difficult to reverse. In the 1740s, more than half the marriages performed in London were clandestine marriages performed in the environs of the Fleet Prison. The majority of these "Fleet marriages" were for honest purposes, when couples simply wanted to get married quickly or at low cost, but there were several scandals involving the elopement of minors, bigamy, kidnap, and forced marriage. Some people were particularly concerned at the possible seduction or kidnap of their daughters or young heiresses by unscrupulous individuals. Young women could marry at twelve years old and their elopement and marriage by a Parson, Vicar, Minister or Curate only interested in the money for performing the marriage was considered a matter of concern.

The 1753 Act, noting that "great Mischiefs and Inconveniencies have arisen from Clandestine Marriages" restricted the legal recognition of marriage in England and Wales from 25 March 1754 to marriages performed by the established Church of England in a Church of England Parish Church or public Chapel, with exemptions for Jews and Quakers. Marriages performed by other Christian denominations, nonconformists, dissenters, other religions, or atheists, and common law marriages, ceased to be recognised. The Act voided all marriages solemnized by licence issued by the Church of England of those under 21 where the consent of the father, guardian, or mother had not been obtained but allowed marriages where banns had been read in the home parishes and no objection had been received from the father, guardian, or mother. The Act required churches performing marriages to keep marriage registers and provided the death penalty for those who committed acts of forgery in a marriage register or for destroying a marriage register. The penalty for any person who solomized a marriage in a place other than a permitted church or chapel or without the required publication of banns or church licence was fourteen years transportation to plantations in America. The Act quickly ended Fleet and other irregular or clandestine marriages.

In England and Wales from 25 March 1754, people of other Christian denominations, other religions, and atheists were forced to undertake Church of England marriages to receive legal recognition of their marriages. Legal recognition gave a number of advantages including the legitimisation of children to enable children to be recognised as heirs.

The 1753 Act was replaced by the English Marriage Acts of 1823 and 1836. The new Acts allowed other religious groups to apply for the registration of their buildings for marriages and to conduct marriages if a Registrar and two witnesses were present and allowed for the secular alternative of non-religious marriages performed by Registrars in registry offices. While the English Marriage Acts did not apply in Scotland or New Zealand and New Zealand had no established church, many English immigrants accustomed to English law and practice, who were a small majority in New Zealand, mistakenly considered that as English law applied in New Zealand the English restrictions on marriage must also apply in New Zealand and that marriages not performed by the Church of England must be clandestine marriages without legal recognition.

=== Marriage Validation Act 1842 ===
The Marriage Validation Act 1842, issued on 21 February 1842 by Governor William Hobson, recognised that doubts existed regarding the validity of marriages under the common law of England "whereby marriages in the Colony are governed" when the marriage was not "solemnized by a minister episcopally ordained". The Act validated all marriages "solemnized by any minister of any Christian denomination, who had not or shall not have received episcopal ordination". There was no provision for Maori, people of other religions, or non-believers.

=== Marriage Act 1847 ===
The Marriage Act of 1847, 1847 No. 7, was the first New Zealand legislation to govern aspects of marriage in New Zealand. Based on the English Acts, it was introduced by Governor George Grey "to regulate the law of marriage in the Colony of New Zealand". From 1 January 1848, a notice or banns had to be issued for marriages twenty-one days before the issue of a marriage license or certificate of marriage. Marriages were to be "solemnized with open doors between the hours of eight in the forenoon and four in the afternoon in the presence of an officiating minister and two or more witnesses" at the place specified on the marriage notice and license or certificate. Marriages were to be performed by officiating ministers in a church building or office or other place specified on the notice and license or certificate, or by Deputy Registrars of Marriage in registry offices or other place specified on the notice and license or certificate. The Act required "that in some part of the ceremony and in the presence of the officiating minister and witnesses as aforesaid each of the parties shall declare— I do solemnly declare that I know not of any lawful impediment why I, A.B., may not be joined in matrimony to C.D. And each of the parties shall say to each other— I call upon these persons here present to witness that I, A.B., do take thee, C.D., to be my lawful wedded wife [or husband]". The Act required all marriages to be registered.

Marriages between Maori were exempted from the Act. Officiating ministers entitled to solemnize marriages were restricted to ministers whose names had previously been provided to the Registrar-General by the recognised head or heads of six religious bodies listed in the Act. The six bodies were: The United Church of England and Ireland, The Church of Scotland, The Free Church of Scotland, all Presbyterian Congregations, The Roman Catholic Church, and The Wesleyan Methodist Society. There were special provisions for Quakers and Jewish people.

No minimum age of marriage was specified but English common law allowed girls to marry at 12, and boys at 14, however, such young marriage was rare and persons under the age of twenty-one required the consent of their father or their guardian in the absence of their father, or their mother when there was no father or guardian. Property obtained by the marriage of a minor without consent where a false declaration of eligibility to marry was involved could be seized by the court from the offending party for the benefit of an innocent party or the children of the marriage.

Penalties for non-compliance with the Act were severe: "any person knowingly and wilfully so offending, and being lawfully convicted thereof, shall be deemed and adjudged to be guilty of felony, and shall be transported for the space of fourteen years: Provided that all prosecutions for such felony shall be commenced within the space of three years after the offence committed".

The Act did not define marriage or specify the sex, sexual orientation, or gender identity of those to be married or the number of people who may be involved in a marriage.

=== Marriage Act 1854 ===
From 1 January 1855, the Marriage Act 1854, 1854 No. 12, increased the number of listed religious bodies entitled to provide officiating ministers to twelve. The twelve bodies were: The United Church of England and Ireland, The Church of Scotland, The Roman Catholic Church, The Free Church of Scotland, all Presbyterian Congregations, The Wesleyan Methodist Society, all Congregational Independents, Baptists, The Primitive Methodist Society, The Lutheran Church, all Hebrew Congregations, and The Society of Friends. The Act also made provision for the recognition of officiating ministers of religion not associated with the listed religious bodies provided they had the support of twenty-four householders.

The penalties for falsely pretending to be an Officiating Minister and solemnizing a marriage and other breaches of the Act were reduced to seven years penal servitude. Maori were exempted from the Act but permitted to marry under the provisions of the Act if they desired to do so and the Governor General could proclaim districts where the Act would apply to Maori marriages. The 1854 Act repealed "An Ordinance for regulating Marriages in New Zealand" (No. 7 of Session No. VIII.).

=== Marriage Act 1880 ===
The Marriage Act 1880, 1880 No. 21 repealed the Marriage Act 1854, 1854 No. 12, and the amendments of 1858, 1868, 1875, and 1876. The 1880 Act revised the list of religious bodies. The twelve bodies listed were: The Church or the Province of New Zealand, commonly called the Church of England; The Presbyterian Church of New Zealand; The Presbyterian Church of Otago and Southland; The Roman Catholic Church; The Wesleyan Methodist Society; All Congregational Independents; Baptists; The Primitive Methodist Connexion; The United Methodist Free Churches; The Lutheran Church; All Hebrew Congregations; and The Society of Friends. It allowed for marriages that did not comply with the Act to be declared void.

=== The Marriage Acts Compilation Act 1904 ===
The Marriage Acts Compilation Act 1904, 1904 No. 19, repealed The Marriage Act 1880, 1880 No. 21 and the amendments of 1889 and 1891, The Deceased Wife's Sister Marriage Act 1880, and The Deceased Husband's Brother Marriage Act, 1900. The Act required that marriages shall be solemnised with open doors, between the hours of eight in the morning and four in the afternoon, in the presence of an Officiating Minister or other person duly authorised by this Act, and in the presence of two or more witnesses. The Act specified ten Religious Bodies: The Church of the Province of New Zealand, commonly called the Church of England; The Presbyterian Church of New Zealand; The Roman Catholic Church; The Methodist Church of Australasia in New Zealand; All Congregational Independents; Baptists; The Primitive Methodist Connexion; The Lutheran Church; All Hebrew Congregations; and The Society of Friends. Maori were exempted from the Act but permitted to marry under the provisions of the Act if they desired to do so. The Governor General could proclaim districts where the Act would apply to Maori marriages.

=== Marriage Act 1908 ===
"The Marriage Act 1908", 1908 No. 113, consolidated and repealed "The Marriage Acts Compilation Act, 1904", 1904, No 19, Including “The Marriage Act, 1904"; "The Marriages Validation Act 1905", 1905, No. 64; and "The Statute Law Amendment Act, 1906": Section 12. The religious bodies recognised by the 1908 Act were: The Church of the Province of New Zealand, commonly called the Church of England; The Presbyterian Church of New Zealand; The Roman Catholic Church; The Methodist Church of Australasia in New Zealand; All Congregational Independents; Baptists; The Primitive Methodist Connexion; The Lutheran Church; All Hebrew Congregations; and The Society of Friends. Maori were exempted from the Act but permitted to marry under the provisions of the Act if they desired to do so. The Governor General could proclaim districts where the Act would apply to Maori marriages

==== Marriage Amendment Act 1933 ====
"The Marriage Amendment Act 1933", 1933 No. 5, voided all marriages "between persons either of whom is under the age of sixteen years" that might take place after the passing of the Act. This increased the minimum age of marriage to 16 for both men and women with consent required from a parent or guardian for those under 21. The Amendment Act also allowed that a person charged with indecent assault under section 216 of the Crimes Act, 1908, may use as a sufficient defence against the proceedings a reasonable belief that the girl against whom he is alleged to have offended was his wife. The Act also affirmed that a woman may be an Officiating Minister.

=== Marriage Act 1955 ===
The Marriage Act 1955, 1955 No. 92, repealed The Marriage Act 1908, 1908 No. 113 (Reprint of Statutes, Vo1. Ill, p. 826.) and seventeen amendments. The Act applied to the marriage of any person domiciled in New Zealand at the time of the marriage, whether the marriage is solemnised in New Zealand or elsewhere. It allowed marriages to be solemnized with open doors in the presence of an officiating minister and two or more witnesses, at any time between the hours of six in the morning and eight in the evening. It recognised nine specified religious bodies: Baptists; The Church of the Province of New Zealand, commonly called the Church of England; Congregational Independents; all Hebrew Congregations; The Lutheran Churches; The Methodist Church of New Zealand; The Presbyterian Church of New Zealand; The Roman Catholic Church; and The Salvation Army. The Greek Orthodox Church was added to the list on 27 November 1970.

Significant amendments to the Act include the replacement of "officiating ministers" with "marriage celebrants" in 1976 allowing non-religious marriages to take place outside of registry offices, the abolition of time of day restrictions in 1999, and the recognition of civil unions in 2005 and same-sex marriages in 2013. The 2013 amendment to allow same-sex marriages provided a definition of marriage for the first time.

==== Marriage Amendment Act 1976 ====
A significant amendment to the 1955 Act occurred in 1976. The Marriage Act Amendment Act 1976 amended the Marriage Act 1955 by replacing the words "officiating minister" with the words "marriage celebrant", where marriage celebrants could be ministers of religion, marriage celebrants of other approved organisations, or independent marriage celebrants.

==== Marriage Amendment Act 1978 ====
"The Marriage Amendment Act 1978", 1978 No. 107, deleted the words "I call on the people present here to witness that" from Section 31 (3) of the principal Act (as substituted by section 6 of the Marriage Amendment Act 1976).

==== Marriage Amendment Act 1994 ====
"The Marriage Amendment Act 1994", 1994 No. 153, deleted the words "with open doors" from Section 31 (2), 32 (1), and 33 (1) of the principal Act (as substituted by section 6, section 5 (2), and section 7 (1) respectively of the Marriage Amendment Act 1976).

==== Marriage Amendment Act 1999 ====
In 1999 the Act was further amended by the Marriage Act Amendment Act 1999 to delete the time restriction that required all marriages to take place between 6 a.m. and 10 p.m. Marriages could now take place at any time and any place.

==== Marriage Amendment Act 2005 ====
As a consequence of the passage of the Civil Union Act 2004, the Marriage Act Amendment Act 2005 was passed, predominately to add provisions relating to civil unions. A separate amending Act was required as the Civil Union Act 2004 was drafted to avoid amending the Marriage Act 1955. The amending Act altered Schedule 2 of the Marriage Act 1955, which lists prohibited marriages, where appropriate to incorporate civil unions. The Amendment Act also defined a minor requiring the consent of a parent or guardian to marry as a person under the age of 18 years and thus lowered the age from 20 to 18. The minimum age of marriage remained unchanged at 16 years.

==== Marriage (Definition of Marriage) Amendment Act 2013 ====
From 19 August 2013, the Marriage (Definition of Marriage) Amendment Act 2013 amended the Marriage Act 1955 to include a definition of marriage to explicitly allow same-sex marriages and amended other legislation as necessary. The definition reads: "marriage means the union of 2 people, regardless of their sex, sexual orientation, or gender identity". Prior to the passage of the Marriage (Definition of Marriage) Amendment Act 2013 there was no definition of marriage in the Marriage Act 1955 or other New Zealand legislation.

==== Minors (Court Consent to Relationships) Legislation Act 2018 ====
A private members bill requiring court consent for the marriage of 16 and 17-year-olds designed to prevent forced marriages, amending the Marriage Act and broadened to cover civil unions and de facto relationships in addition to marriages, passed its third reading on 8 August 2018, received Royal Assent on 13 August 2018, and came into force as the Minors (Court Consent to Relationships) Legislation Act 2018 on 14 August 2018.

== See also ==
- Civil union in New Zealand
- Same-sex marriage in New Zealand
- New Zealand culture
- Christian views on marriage
- Marriageable age
- Marriage in England and Wales
- Marriage in Northern Ireland
- Marriage in Scotland
- Marriage in the Catholic Church
