= Same-sex marriage in New Zealand =

Same-sex marriage has been legal in New Zealand since 19 August 2013. A bill for legalisation, the Marriage (Definition of Marriage) Amendment Act 2013, was passed by the House of Representatives on 17 April 2013 by 77 votes to 44 and received royal assent on 19 April. It entered into force on 19 August, to allow time for the Department of Internal Affairs to make the necessary changes for marriage licensing and related documentation. New Zealand was the first country in Oceania, the fourth in the Southern Hemisphere, and the fifteenth in the world to allow same-sex couples to marry. Polling suggests that a large majority of New Zealanders support the legal recognition of same-sex marriage. Civil unions have also been available to both same-sex and opposite-sex couples since 2005.

The New Zealand Parliament can enact marriage laws only in regard to New Zealand proper and the Ross Dependency in Antarctica. The three other territories making up the Realm of New Zealand—the Cook Islands, Niue, and Tokelau—do not recognise same-sex marriage or civil unions.

== Civil unions ==
Civil unions (Māori: hononga ā-ture, pronounced [ˈhɔnɔŋa ˈaːtʉɾɛ]) were legalised for both same-sex and opposite-sex couples on 26 April 2005 following the passage of the Civil Union Act 2004 by the New Zealand Parliament. Couples in civil unions are granted several of the rights and obligations of marriage, including immigration rights, next-of-kin status, social welfare and property rights, amongst others.

== Same-sex marriage ==
Recognition of same-sex relationships in Oceania Marriage Marriages performed elsewhere are recognized (American Samoa) No recognition of same-sex couples Constitution limits marriage to opposite-sex couples (Palau, Tuvalu) Same-sex sexual activity illegal, but criminalisation not enforced Same-sex sexual activity illegal (Country names will appear with mouse-overs when map is viewed at full size. Encircling lines are the exclusive economic zones of each state.)

=== Early court cases ===
The case Quilter v Attorney-General had its origin in early 1996 when three female couples in long-term relationships, including Jenny Rowan and Juliet Joslin, were denied marriage licences by the Registrar-General because marriage under common law was between "one man and one woman". The case against the New Zealand Government was taken to the High Court in May 1996. The applicants argued that the Marriage Act 1955 did not prohibit same-sex marriage and that under the New Zealand Bill of Rights Act 1990 and the Human Rights Act 1993 discrimination on the basis of sexual orientation was prohibited.

Both parties agreed that at the time the Marriage Act 1955 was written in the 1950s, marriage according to common law was between "one man and one woman", which explained why the Act did not specifically outlaw same-sex marriage. The applicants argued, however, that under the Human Rights Act 1993, which prohibits discrimination based on sexual orientation, and sections 6 ("Interpretation consistent with Bill of Rights to be preferred") and 19 ("Freedom from discrimination") of the Bill of Rights, New Zealand prohibits discrimination based on sexual orientation and, therefore, the applicants should be allowed to marry. The government in response cited section 5 ("Justified limitations") of the Bill of Rights, which allows rights and freedoms in the Bill of Rights to "be subject only to such reasonable limits prescribed by law as can be demonstrably justified in a free and democratic society". In its decision, the High Court sided with the government and common law and reiterated that marriage was between "one man and one woman". The High Court decision was appealed to the Court of Appeal (then New Zealand's highest court) in December 1997, which upheld the ruling.

On 30 November 1998, two couples involved in Quilter sued New Zealand at the United Nations Human Rights Committee in Ms. Juliet Joslin et al. v New Zealand claiming that the ban on same-sex marriage violated the International Covenant on Civil and Political Rights. The Committee rejected the case on 17 July 2002.

=== Background ===
During the 2005 election, Prime Minister Helen Clark said she thought it was discriminatory to exclude same-sex couples from the Marriage Act 1955, but said her government would not change the law due to public opinion. Instead, she praised civil unions.

In 2005, United Future MP Gordon Copeland sponsored the Marriage (Gender Clarification) Amendment Bill that would have amended New Zealand marriage law to define marriage as only between "a man and a woman", and amend anti-discrimination protections in the Bill of Rights related to marital and family status so that the bill could stand. This was criticised by opponents, including Attorney General Michael Cullen, as an overly "radical" attack on the Bill of Rights. The bill also would have prohibited the recognition of same-sex marriages from foreign countries as marriages in New Zealand. The bill received a Section 7 report for being inconsistent with the Bill of Rights, specifically freedom from discrimination relating to sexual orientation. It had its first reading debate on 7 December 2005, and subsequently failed 47 votes in favour to 73 votes against.

7 December 2005 vote in the House of Representatives
Party	Voted for	Voted against	Abstained
G New Zealand Labour Party	1: Taito Phillip Field	49: Rick Barker; Tim Barnett; David Benson-Pope; Georgina Beyer; Mark Burton; Chris Carter; Steve Chadwick; Ashraf Choudhary; Helen Clark; Clayton Cosgrove; Michael Cullen; David Cunliffe; Lianne Dalziel; Harry Duynhoven; Ruth Dyson; Russell Fairbrother; Darien Fenton; Martin Gallagher; Phil Goff; Mark Gosche; Ann Hartley; George Hawkins; Dave Hereora; Marian Hobbs; Pete Hodgson; Parekura Horomia; Darren Hughes; Shane Jones; Annette King; Luamanuvao Winnie Laban; Moana Mackey; Steve Maharey; Nanaia Mahuta; Trevor Mallard; Sue Moroney; Damien O'Connor; Mahara Okeroa; David Parker; Jill Pettis; Lynne Pillay; Mita Ririnui; Ross Robertson; Dover Samuels; Maryan Street; Jim Sutton; Paul Swain; Judith Tizard; Margaret Wilson; Dianne Yates	–
New Zealand National Party	36: Shane Ardern; Chris Auchinvole; David Bennett; Paula Bennett; Jackie Blue; Chester Borrows; Don Brash; Gerry Brownlee; David Carter; John Carter; Bob Clarkson; Jonathan Coleman; Judith Collins; Jacqui Dean; Bill English; Craig Foss; Jo Goodhew; Sandra Goudie; Nathan Guy; John Hayes; Phil Heatley; Paul Hutchison; Colin King; Wayne Mapp; Murray McCully; Allan Peachey; Eric Roy; Tony Ryall; Lockwood Smith; Nick Smith; Lindsay Tisch; Anne Tolley; Chris Tremain; Nicky Wagner; Kate Wilkinson; Richard Worth	12: Mark Blumsky; Brian Connell; Chris Finlayson; Tim Groser; Tau Henare; John Key; Simon Power; Katherine Rich; Clem Simich; Georgina te Heuheu; Maurice Williamson; Pansy Wong	–
New Zealand First	5: Peter Brown; Pita Paraone; Winston Peters; Barbara Stewart; Doug Woolerton	2: Brian Donnelly; Ron Mark	–
Green Party of Aotearoa New Zealand	–	6: Sue Bradford; Jeanette Fitzsimons; Sue Kedgley; Keith Locke; Nándor Tánczos; Metiria Turei	–
Māori Party	–	3: Te Ururoa Flavell; Pita Sharples; Tariana Turia	1: Hone Harawira
United Future	3: Gordon Copeland; Peter Dunne; Judy Turner	–	–
ACT New Zealand	2: Heather Roy; Rodney Hide	–	–
G Jim Anderton's Progressive Party	–	1: Jim Anderton	–
Total	47	73	1
Total	38.8%	60.3%	0.8%

=== Marriage (Definition of Marriage) Amendment Act 2013 ===
On 14 May 2012, Labour Party MP Louisa Wall said she would introduce a private member's bill, the Marriage (Definition of Marriage) Amendment Bill, allowing same-sex couples to marry. The bill was submitted to the members' bill ballot on 30 May 2012. It was drawn from the ballot and passed its first and second readings on 29 August 2012 and 13 March 2013, respectively. The final reading passed on 17 April 2013 by 77 votes to 44. Despite being one of six openly gay MPs, Attorney-General Chris Finlayson voted against the bill, declaring his opposition to state involvement in the institution of marriage as the reason. Supporters in the galleries greeted the bill's passage with applause and sang the traditional Māori love song "Pōkarekare Ana", with many MPs joining in. Conservative lobby group Family First called its passage "an arrogant act of cultural vandalism". The bill received royal assent from Governor-General Jerry Mateparae on 19 April and took effect on 19 August 2013.

The Marriage (Definition of Marriage) Amendment Act 2013 (Māori: Te Ture Mārena Takatāpui 2013) amended the Marriage Act 1955 to include a definition of marriage explicitly allowing same-sex marriages, and amended other legislation as necessary. The definition reads: Marriage means the union of 2 people, regardless of their sex, sexual orientation, or gender identity. (Note: Māori: Mārena ko te hononga o ngā tāngata tokorua, ahakoa tō rāua arotoka ā-ia, tō rāua aronga hōkaka, tō rāua tuakiri ā-ira.) Prior to the passage of the Act, there was no explicit definition of marriage in New Zealand legislation.

17 April 2013 vote in the House of Representatives
Party	Voted for	Voted against	Abstained
G New Zealand National Party	27: Amy Adams; Chris Auchinvole; Maggie Barry; David Bennett; Paula Bennett; Jackie Blue; Cam Calder; David Carter; Judith Collins; Jacqui Dean; Craig Foss; Aaron Gilmore; Paul Goldsmith; Jo Goodhew; Tim Groser; Tau Henare; Paul Hutchison; Steven Joyce; Nikki Kaye; John Key (PM); Hekia Parata; Jami-Lee Ross; Scott Simpson; Chris Tremain; Nicky Wagner; Kate Wilkinson; Maurice Williamson	32: Shane Ardern; Kanwal Singh Bakshi; Chester Borrows; Simon Bridges; Gerry Brownlee; Jonathan Coleman; Bill English; Chris Finlayson; Nathan Guy; John Hayes; Phil Heatley; Colin King; Melissa Lee; Sam Lotu-Iiga; Tim Macindoe; Todd McClay; Murray McCully; Ian McKelvie; Mark Mitchell; Alfred Ngaro; Simon O'Connor; Eric Roy; Tony Ryall; Mike Sabin; Katrina Shanks; Nick Smith; Lindsay Tisch; Anne Tolley; Louise Upston; Michael Woodhouse; Jian Yang; Jonathan Young	–
New Zealand Labour Party	30: Jacinda Ardern; Carol Beaumont; David Clark; Clayton Cosgrove; David Cunliffe; Clare Curran; Lianne Dalziel; Ruth Dyson; Kris Faafoi; Darien Fenton; Phil Goff; Chris Hipkins; Parekura Horomia; Raymond Huo; Shane Jones; Annette King; Iain Lees-Galloway; Andrew Little; Moana Mackey; Nanaia Mahuta; Trevor Mallard; Sue Moroney; David Parker; Rajen Prasad; Grant Robertson; David Shearer; Maryan Street; Phil Twyford; Louisa Wall; Megan Woods	4: Damien O'Connor; Ross Robertson; Rino Tirikatene; William Sio	–
Green Party of Aotearoa New Zealand	14: Steffan Browning; David Clendon; Catherine Delahunty; Julie Anne Genter; Kennedy Graham; Kevin Hague; Gareth Hughes; Jan Logie; Mojo Mathers; Russel Norman; Denise Roche; Eugenie Sage; Metiria Turei; Holly Walker	–	–
New Zealand First	–	7: Asenati Lole-Taylor; Tracey Martin; Winston Peters; Richard Prosser; Barbara Stewart; Andrew Williams; Denis O'Rourke	–
G Māori Party	3: Pita Sharples; Te Ururoa Flavell; Tariana Turia	–	–
G ACT New Zealand	1: John Banks	–	–
Mana Party	1: Hone Harawira	–	–
G United Future	1: Peter Dunne	–	–
Independent	–	1: Brendan Horan	–
Total	77	44	0
Total	63.6%	36.4%	0.0%

That Monday, 19 August 2013, 31 same-sex couples married across New Zealand: 15 in Auckland, 6 in Wellington, 6 in Christchurch and 4 in Rotorua. Among the first couples to marry were Natasha Vitali and Melissa Ray in Auckland, who had won a competition on a radio show for an all-expenses paid ceremony. Lynley Bendall and Ally Wanikau were married in an Air New Zealand flight between Auckland and Queenstown in a ceremony attended by U.S. actor Jesse Tyler Ferguson.

In December 2016, in his first press conference after taking office, Prime Minister Bill English said he would vote in favour of same-sex marriage if another vote were to be held. He said, "I'd probably vote differently now on the gay marriage issue. I don't think that gay marriage is a threat to anyone else's marriage." English voted against the Civil Union Act 2004 and the Marriage (Definition of Marriage) Amendment Act 2013, and in favour of the Marriage (Gender Clarification) Amendment Bill 2005. Prime Minister Jacinda Ardern, in office between 2017 and 2022, supported same-sex marriage.

=== Historical and customary recognition ===
While Māori culture historically practiced polygamy to a limited extent, there are no records of same-sex marriages being performed in local communities in the way they are commonly defined in Western legal systems. However, Māori recognise identities and relationships that may be placed on the LGBT spectrum; "Māori culture has a much wider understanding of intimate relationships [than the West], with individuals in same-sex relationships accepted as part of family structures for centuries." A term that originally meant individuals in same-sex relationships, takatāpui (Māori pronunciation: [ˌtakaˈtaːpʉi]), has recently been reclaimed to mean a Māori gay, bisexual or transgender individual. However, this identity has been shaped by the Western introduction of "conservative Christian morality", and as a result "many Māori hold views about sexuality that are customary in Christianity", leading takatāpui and whakawāhine to experience discrimination from their family and community. In August 2013, Reverend Hirini Kaa, speaking on the issue of whether the Anglican Church should recognise same-sex marriages, stated that "Māori principles, such as whanaungatanga [kinship], manaakitanga [hospitality] and aroha [love] will make it hard to turn gay whānau away". Carvings, traditional songs, karakia, and stories were explicit about sexual diversity.

=== Economic impact ===
New Zealand has long been a destination for international weddings. Beginning in 2013, when same-sex marriage was not yet legal in Australia and other Asian and Pacific countries, many same-sex couples from these regions took advantage of New Zealand's inclusive marriage laws and chose to marry there. This proved highly beneficial for the country's economy. A 2016 study by economists from the Australia and New Zealand Banking Group estimated that Australian same-sex marriages were worth A$550 million annually, noting that "Australia's loss was New Zealand's gain". In 2016, Australian couples accounted for 29% of all same-sex marriages or civil unions performed in New Zealand.

=== Statistics ===
In the year after 19 August 2013 (when the law became operational), 926 same-sex marriages were registered in New Zealand, of which 520 were between female couples and 406 were between male couples. 532 marriages (57.5%) were between New Zealand citizens, and 237 marriages (25.6%) were between Australian citizens.

In 2016, 954 same-sex marriages and civil unions were performed in New Zealand. Of these, 483 unions were between couples living in New Zealand, while 471 were between couples who had travelled from overseas, of which 58% were from Australia, 17% from China, 4% from the United Kingdom, another 4% from the United States and the remainder from 25 other countries. Same-sex unions represented 4.1% of all unions performed in New Zealand that year. Figures for 2020 and 2021 are lower than previous years because of the restrictions in place due to the COVID-19 pandemic. Around 4,100 same-sex marriages had been performed in New Zealand by August 2023, a decade after legalisation. Most marriages were performed in the Auckland Region, though the Wellington Region had the highest proportion of same-sex marriages. Queenstown and Wānaka were popular destinations for international weddings.

Number of marriages performed in New Zealand
Year	New Zealand residents		Overseas residents	
Year	Opposite-sex	Same-sex	Opposite-sex	Same-sex
2013	19,029	210	2,271	147
2014	19,638	486	2,508	390
2015	19,440	453	2,472	432
2016	19,719	465	2,484	468
2017	20,145	462	2,628	495
2018	20,394	492	2,730	375
2019	18,609	408	2,613	264
2020	16,347	387	1,152	90
2021	15,300	300	219	9
2022	18,375	450	1,221	90
2023	18,225	468	2,304	207
2024	17,487	489	2,184	222
2025	17,001	432	2,343	207

=== Religious performance ===
In 2014, the synod of the Anglican Church in Aotearoa, New Zealand and Polynesia passed a resolution creating a pathway towards the blessing of same-sex relationships. In the meantime, "clergy should be permitted 'to recognise in public worship' a same-gender civil union or state marriage of members of their faith community." Some dioceses offer a "relationship blessing", notably the dioceses of Auckland, Dunedin, and Waiapu. In 2005, a same-sex couple was joined in a civil union at St Matthew's-in-the-City Church in Auckland. In May 2018, the Anglican Church voted to allow its ministers to bless same-sex civil marriages and unions. Ministers may offer their blessing to civil marriages but are not permitted to perform same-sex wedding ceremonies in the church. Some parishes in Christchurch and Dunedin chose to leave the Anglican Church over the decision, while church leaders in Rangiora and Blenheim announced publicly that they would resign.

Quakers were among the first religious denomination in New Zealand to recognise and support same-sex marriage. Following the passage of the same-sex marriage legislation in Parliament, the Methodist Church of New Zealand responded that it would allow its parishes to perform same-sex marriages in its churches. A Methodist minister in Napier said, "If a parish is willing to have same-sex marriages happen in its church, but the incumbent minister is not comfortable, then it can invite a minister from another parish who is happy to perform the ceremony, and vice versa. If a minister is happy to perform and the parish is not, then the minister may seek to use another Methodist church that is accepting." The Australia and New Zealand Unitarian Universalist Association also allows its clergy to perform same-sex marriages, with the first same-sex marriage in New Zealand on 19 August 2013 being performed in the Auckland Unitarian Church. In 2015, the Church of the Flying Spaghetti Monster was granted permission to officiate at marriages, including same-sex marriages. Some Buddhist groups also perform same-sex marriages.

The Presbyterian Church of Aotearoa New Zealand does not allow its clergy to solemnise same-sex marriages, passing a motion in 2014 that "ministers may conduct marriage only between a man and woman". Rātana ministers (āpotoro rēhita) may also not perform same-sex weddings, with a minister in Manurewa saying in 2013 that same-sex marriage was "not part of our structure of beliefs". The Baptist Churches of New Zealand likewise forbids its ministers from solemnising same-sex marriages, though media outlets reported in July 2019 that some ministers were secretly marrying same-sex couples in defiance of the ban. The Catholic Church opposes same-sex marriage and does not allow its priests to officiate at such marriages. In December 2023, the Holy See published Fiducia supplicans, a declaration allowing Catholic priests to bless couples who are not considered to be married according to church teaching, including the blessing of same-sex couples. In October 2020, the Bishop of Auckland, Patrick Dunn, expressed support for civil unions: "I endorse the reported comments of Pope Francis. I know that he is anxious for LGBTQ people to know that they are valued members of the family of the Church as they are of their own families. We want their happiness, and for them to know that they are loved."

== Public opinion ==
=== Opinion polls ===
Date	Conducted by	Sample size	In favour	Against	Neutral/Undecided	Margin of error
17 February – 3 March 2023	Ipsos	1,000 adults	70%	20%	10%	±3.5%
11–17 March 2013	Herald-DigiPoll	750 adults	50%	48%	2%	±3.6%
13–19 December 2012	Key Research	1,000 adults	54%	38%	8%	±3.1%
December 2012	Herald-DigiPoll	500 adults	59%	38%	3%	±4.4%
11–17 September 2012	Research New Zealand	500 adults	49%	32%	19%	±4.7%
18–28 June 2012	Herald-DigiPoll	750 adults	53.5%	40.5%	6%	±3.6%
26–30 May 2012	ONE News Colmar Brunton Poll	1,005 voters	63%	31%	6%	±3.1%
6–9 July 2011	Research New Zealand	500 adults	60%	34%	6%	±4.6%
September 2004	Herald-DigiPoll	750 adults	40%	54%	6%	?

Per the December 2012 Herald-DigiPoll, support for same-sex marriage varied by age: young people overwhelmingly supported same-sex marriage, whereas people above 65 were mostly opposed. A poll conducted by the Waikato Times in August 2012 found that 46% of Waikato residents supported same-sex marriage, while 39% were opposed. Public opposition to same-sex marriage sharply increased during the time the same-sex marriage bill was being discussed by Parliament. LGBTQ groups attributed this increase to "scaremongering", while opponents claimed that "people [were] waking up to the negative social effects of changing the Marriage Act". However, opposition to same-sex marriage has significantly decreased since the bill has become law, being under 25% according to a 2016 poll. The 2023 Ipsos poll showed that 70% of New Zealanders supported same-sex marriage, while 11% supported civil unions or other types of partnerships but not marriage, 10% were undecided and 9% were opposed to all recognition for same-sex couples.

A September–October 2016 survey by the Varkey Foundation found that 74% of 18–21-year-olds supported same-sex marriage in New Zealand.

=== Public campaigns ===
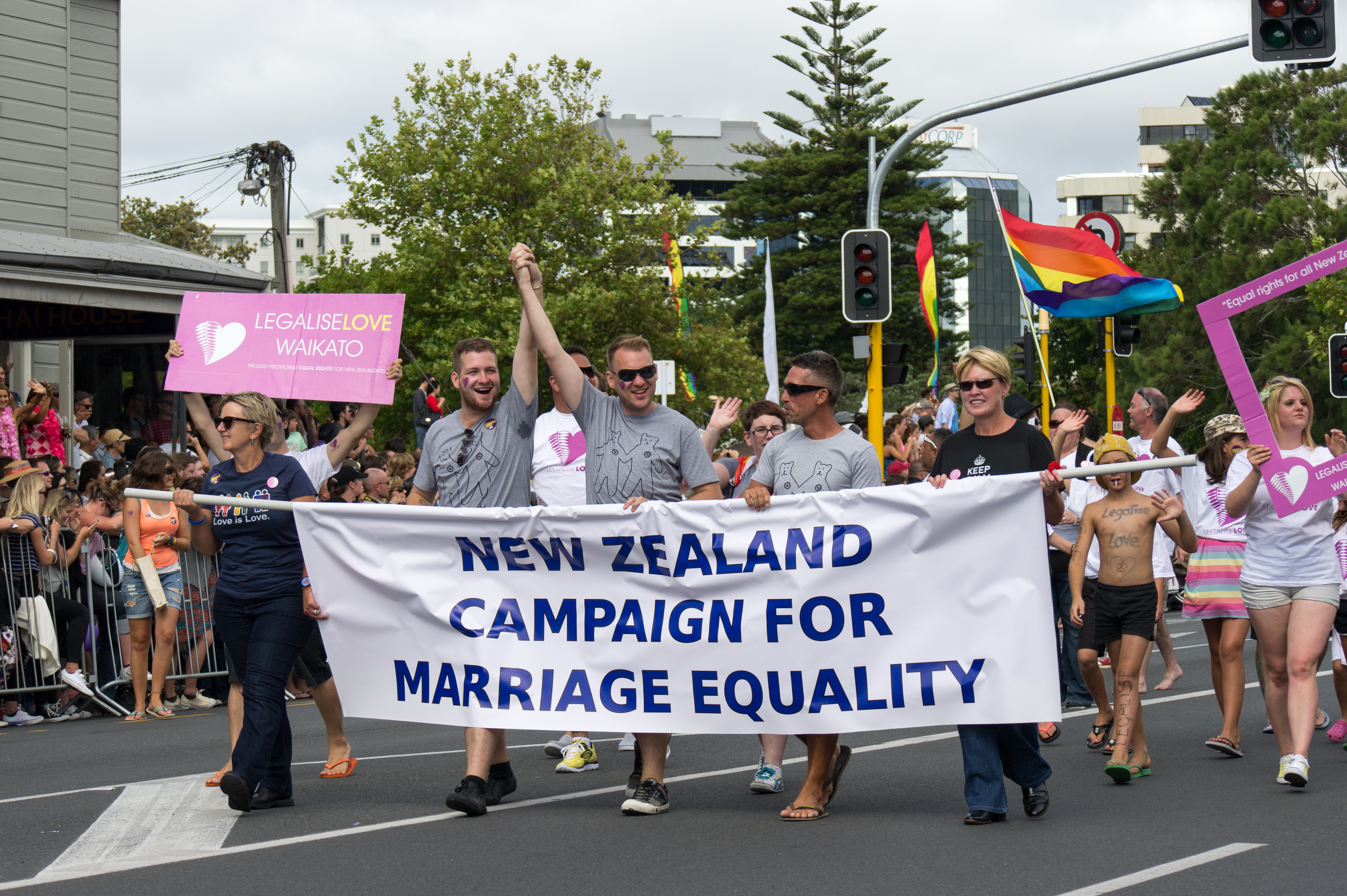
Supporters of same-sex marriage at Auckland Pride Festival in February 2013

Support for same-sex marriage among 18–21-year-olds according to a 2016 survey from the Varkey Foundation

The Legalise Love campaign was launched in August 2011 to promote legal marriage and adoption equality in New Zealand, and a protest was organised at the New Zealand Parliament Buildings in October that year. In December 2012, former Governor-General Catherine Tizard starred in an online video campaign organised by the Campaign for Marriage Equality supporting same-sex marriage, alongside New Zealand singers Anika Moa, Boh Runga and Hollie Smith, as well as Olympian Danyon Loader. The Human Rights Commission, which also supports same-sex marriage, said that if the marriage bill is passed churches will not be forced to perform marriages between same-sex couples.

Public opposition to same-sex marriage has come from the Catholic Church in New Zealand, as well as from the Conservative Party and Family First. In June 2012, Family First leader Bob McCoskrie announced the launch of a new website, "Protect Marriage NZ", which outlines reasons for opposing same-sex marriage in New Zealand, which subsequently crashed on its first day after a large scale denial-of-service attack. A petition with 50,000 signatures expressing opposition to same-sex marriage was presented to Parliament in August 2012, in the lead-up to the first reading of the Marriage (Definition of Marriage) Amendment Bill. During the last fortnight before the third reading debate, several conservative Christian organisations held "prayer rallies" in Auckland and Wellington (including outside the Beehive), against the enactment of same-sex marriage. Anika Moa, who came out as a lesbian in 2007, was planning a free concert in Christchurch for the night of the third reading of the bill to "celebrate a historic milestone for same-sex couples".

In March 2013, the youth wings of all eight parties represented in Parliament jointly announced their support for the bill, including the youth wing of New Zealand First, whose MPs had said that they were going to vote against it. After the third reading of the Marriage (Definition of Marriage) Amendment Act 2013, Conservative Party Leader Colin Craig called the legalisation of same-sex marriage a "failure of democracy", and warned "the day of reckoning" would come. At the 2014 general election, the Conservative Party failed to enter Parliament because it polled below the New Zealand electoral system's five percent threshold for party list-only representation. No other New Zealand political party has shown any inclination to revisit the issue; however, Family First continues to operate its "Protect Marriage NZ" website.

== See also ==
- Marriage in New Zealand
- LGBT in New Zealand
- LGBT rights in New Zealand
- Recognition of same-sex unions in the Cook Islands
- Recognition of same-sex unions in Oceania
