= Mele (island) =

Mele (Hideaway Island)
- Island resort
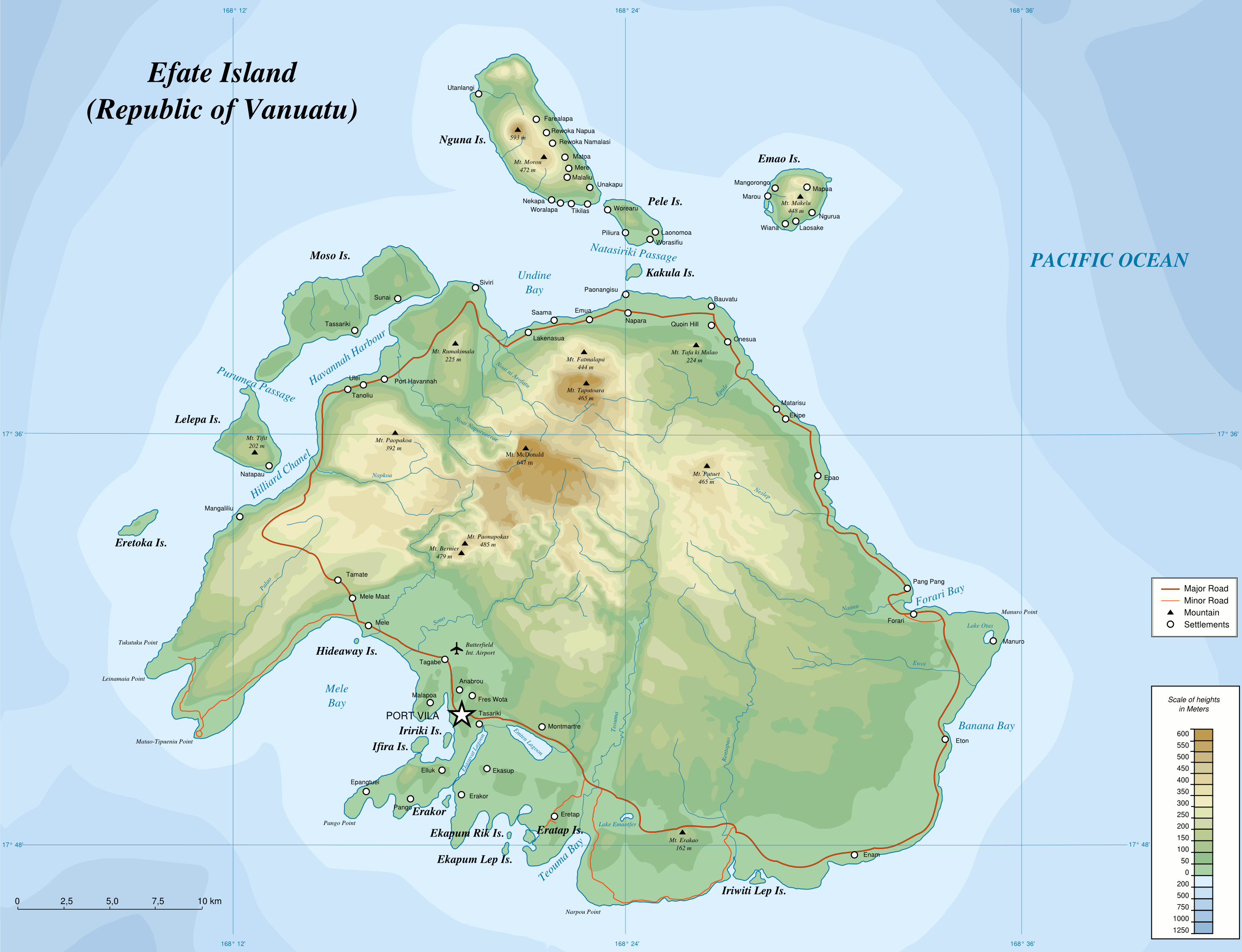
- Location of Hideaway Island in Mele Bay, west Efate

- Location in Vanuatu
- Coordinates: 17°41′S 168°15′E
- Country: Vanuatu
- Province: Shefa Province
- Time zone: UTC+11 (VUT)
- Website: Official website

Mele (also known as Hideaway Island) is a Polynesian outlier and islet in Vanuatu.

The island is owned by the local Mele villagers, but is leased to the owners of Hideaway Island Resort. On the seaward side of the island is a marine reserve with abundant tropical fish and other sealife. The island is accessed by a 24hr boat service from nearby Mele Bay beach and offers accommodation and watersports to visitors. Mele has one of only a few underwater post offices in the world, which is open daily and allows visitors to post letters that are postmarked in a waterproof manner.

== History ==
In archaeological analysis, Mele has been a Polynesian outlier as it was settled by Polynesian seafarers.

The island has since been a privately owned resort. On 26 May 2003, the world's first underwater post office was opened.

== Wildlife ==
On the shore of the islet, various species of bird, lizard, and hermit crab scatter the coral shore. Surrounding the islet is a wide variety of aquatic species including fish, eels, sharks, and vegetation. All of these organisms are accommodated in a luscious and lively system of reefs that support the biodiversity of the wildlife.
