= Episcopal Conference of the Pacific =

Assembly of Catholic bishops in Oceania

The Episcopal Conference of the Pacific (Latin: Conferentia Episcopalis Pacifici) (CEPAC) is the episcopal conference of the Catholic Church that includes the bishops of several islands in Oceania. The CEPAC is a member of the Federation of Catholic Bishops Conferences of Oceania (FCBCO).

== Member dioceses of CEPAC ==
=== Ecclesiastical Province of Agaña ===
- Archdiocese of Agaña (Guam)
- Diocese of Chalan Kanoa (Northern Mariana Islands)
- Diocese of Caroline Islands (Palau and Federated States of Micronesia)
- Apostolic Prefecture of the Marshall Islands (Marshall Islands)

=== Ecclesiastical Province of Nouméa ===
- Archdiocese of Nouméa (New Caledonia)
- Diocese of Port-Vila (Vanuatu)
- Diocese of Wallis et Futuna (Wallis and Futuna)

=== Ecclesiastical Province of Papeete ===
- Archdiocese of Papeete (French Polynesia)
- Diocese of Taiohae or Tefenuaenata (French Polynesia)

=== Ecclesiastical Province of Samoa-Apia ===
- Archdiocese of Samoa–Apia (Samoa)
- Diocese of Samoa–Pago Pago (American Samoa)
- Mission Sui Iuris of Tokelau (Tokelau)

=== Ecclesiastical Province of Suva ===
- Archdiocese of Suva (Fiji)
- Diocese of Rarotonga (Cook Islands)
- Diocese of Tarawa and Nauru (Kiribati and Nauru)
- Mission Sui Iuris of Funafuti (Tuvalu)

=== Immediately Subject to the Holy See ===
- Diocese of Tonga (Tonga and Niue)

== Presidents of CEPAC ==
- Archbishop Ryan Pagente Jimenez (2023.11 – present)
- Bishop Paul Donoghue (2016 – 2023.11)
- Cardinal Soane Patita Paini Mafi ( (2010.06 – 2016.09)
- Archbishop Anthony Sablan Apuron, OFMCap (2003.08 – 2010.06)
- Archbishop Michel-Marie-Bernard Calvet, SM (1996–2003)
- Archbishop Anthony Sablan Apuron, OFMCap (1991–1996)
- Bishop Francis-Roland Lambert, SM (1987–1991)
- Archbishop Petero Mataca (1982–1987)
- Bishop Patelisio Punou-Ki-Hihifo Finau, SM (1978–1982)
- Archbishop Pierre-Paul-Émile Martin, SM (1971–1978)
- Archbishop George Hamilton Pearce, SM (1970–1971)

== Seminary ==
- Pacific Regional Seminary, created in 1970 and opened in 1972
