= Samoic languages =

Purported group of Polynesian languages

Samoic
- Samoic–Outlier
- Geographic distribution: Polynesian islands
- Linguistic classification: Austronesian: Malayo-Polynesian; Central–Eastern Malayo-Polynesian?; Eastern Malayo-Polynesian; Oceanic; Central–Eastern Oceanic; Central Pacific; East Central Pacific; Polynesian; Nuclear Polynesian; Samoic
- Subdivisions: East Uvean–Niuafo'ou; Ellicean; Futunic; Pukapuka; Samoan; Tokelauan

Language codes
- Glottolog: None

The Samoic languages are a purported group of the Polynesian languages spoken in Samoa, Tuvalu, American Samoa, Tokelau, Wallis and Futuna, New Caledonia, the Solomon Islands, Vanuatu, Papua New Guinea, and the Federated States of Micronesia. The name Samoic-Outlier recognizes Samoan.

== Classification ==
=== Ethnologue ===
According to Ethnologue 26, the Samoic–Outlier languages are as follows:

- Samoic–Outlier
  - East Uvean–Niuafo’ou
    - Niuatoputapu
    - Niuafo’ou
    - Wallisian
  - Ellicean
    - Kapingamarangi
    - Takuu
    - Nukuoro
    - Nukumanu
    - Nukeria
    - Ontong Java
    - Sikaiana
    - Tuvaluan
  - Futunic
    - Anuta
    - East Futuna
    - Futuna–Aniwa
    - Emae
    - Rennell–Bellona
    - Mele–Fila
    - Vaeakau–Taumako
    - Tikopia
    - Fagauvea
  - Pukapuka
  - Samoan
  - Tokelauan

=== Glottolog ===
Hammarström et al. do not view the Samoic–Outlier languages as a valid phylogenetic clade. As such, the languages classified as Samoic–Outlier languages in Ethnologue are classified in the Glottolog database within Nuclear Polynesian as follows:

- Nuclear Polynesian
  - Anuta
  - East Futuna
  - East Uvean–Niuafoʻou
    - East Uvean
    - Niuafoʻou
    - Niuatoputapu
  - Ellicean
    - Pukapukic
      - Pukapuka
      - Samoan–Tokelauan
        - Samoan
        - Tokelau
    - Tuvalu
  - Northern Outlier Polynesian–East Polynesian
    - Carolinean Outlier Polynesian
      - Kapingamarangi
      - Nukuoro
    - Solomons Northern Outlier Polynesian–East Polynesian
      - Central Northern Outlier Polynesian–East Polynesian
        - Central Northern Outlier Polynesian
          - Luangiua
          - Takuuic
            - Nukumanu
            - Nukuria
            - Takuu
        - East Polynesian
          - [...]
      - Sikaiana
  - Rennell–Bellona
  - Tikopia
  - Vaeakau–Taumako
  - Vanuatu–Loyalty Outliers
    - Emae
    - Mele–Futuna
      - Futuna–Aniwa
      - Mele–Fila
    - West Uvean
