= Nuclear Polynesian languages =

Language branch

Nuclear Polynesian
- Geographic distribution: Polynesia
- Linguistic classification: Austronesian: Malayo-Polynesian; Oceanic; Polynesian; Nuclear Polynesian
- Proto-language: Proto-Nuclear Polynesian
- Subdivisions: Eastern Polynesian; Samoic

Language codes
- Glottolog: nucl1485

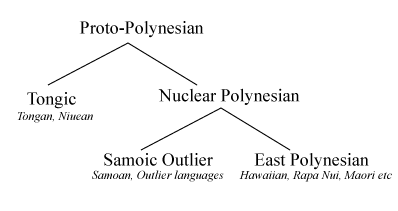
Major subgroups of Polynesian

Nuclear Polynesian includes those languages comprising the Samoic and the Eastern Polynesian branches of the Polynesian group of Austronesian languages.

The Eastern Polynesian group comprises two major subgroups: Rapa Nui, spoken on Easter Island, and Central-Eastern, which is itself composed of Rapan, and the Marquesic and Tahitic languages.

Nuclear Polynesian is differentiated, among Polynesian languages, by its distinguishing characteristics from the Tongic languages spoken in most of Tonga and in Niue.

== Languages ==
- Nuclear Polynesian
  - Samoic
    - East Uvean–Niuafo'ou languages
    - Ellicean languages
    - Futunic languages
    - Pukapuka
    - Samoan
    - Tokelauan
  - Eastern Polynesian
    - Rapa Nui
    - Central Eastern Polynesian
      - Rapa
      - Marquesic languages
        - Hawaiian
        - Marquesan
          - Northern
          - Southern
        - Mangarevan
      - Tahitic languages
        - Austral
        - Māori
        - Tuamotuan
        - Penrhyn
        - Rarotongan
        - Rakahanga-Manihiki
        - Tahitian

== Alternative classification ==
- Nuclear Polynesian
  - Futunic languages
  - Pukapuka
  - Ellicean languages
    - Samoic
      - Samoan
      - Tokelauan
    - Ellicean–Outlier
      - Tuvaluan
      - Nukuoro
      - Kapingamarangi
      - Nukuria
      - Takuu
      - Nukumanu
      - Ontong Java
      - Sikaiana
      - Pileni
    - Eastern Polynesian
