= Polynesians =

Austronesian ethnolinguistic group

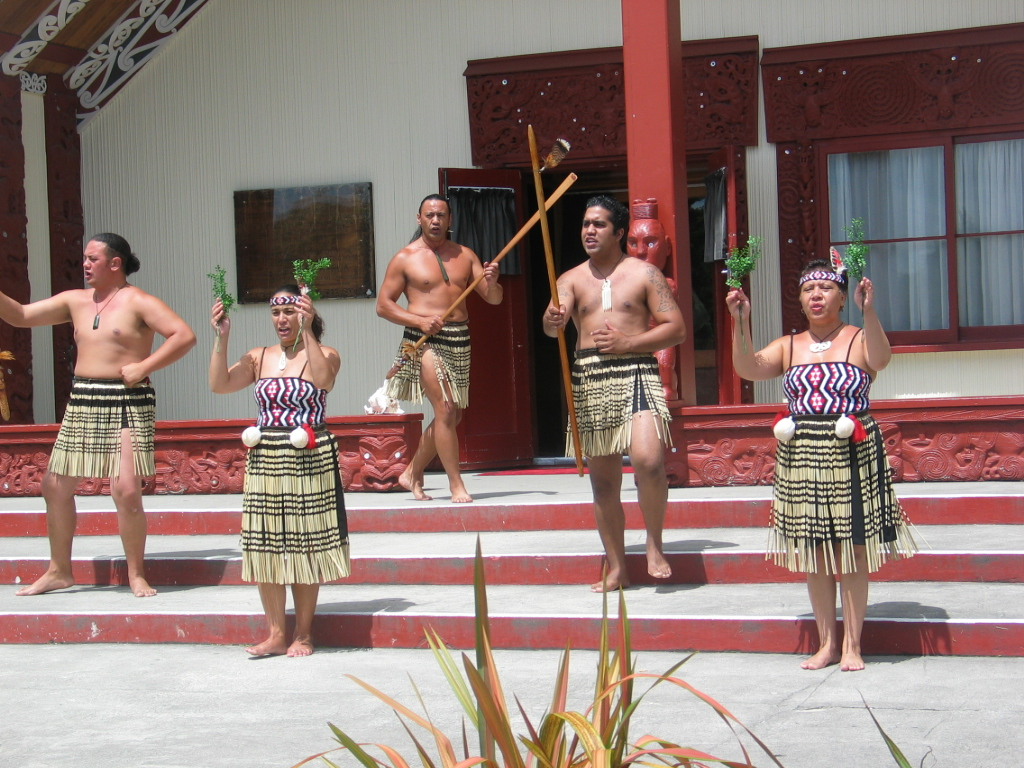
- Polynesian Māori people in New Zealand

Total population
- c. 3,300,000

Regions with significant populations
- New Zealand: 1,347,954
- United States: 988,519
- Australia: 409,805
- French Polynesia: c. 215,000
- Samoa: 192,342
- Tonga: 103,036
- Hawaii: c. 94,025
- Cook Islands: 17,683
- Canada: 10,760
- Tuvalu: 10,645
- Chile: 6,659

Languages
- Polynesian languages (Hawaiian, Māori, Rapa Nui, Samoan, Tahitian, Tongan, Tuvaluan and others), English, French and Spanish

Religion
- Christianity (96.1%) and Polynesian mythology

Related ethnic groups
- other Austronesian peoples, Euronesians

Polynesians are an ethnolinguistic group comprising closely related ethnic groups native to Polynesia, which encompasses the islands within the Polynesian Triangle in the Pacific Ocean. They trace their early prehistoric origins to Island Southeast Asia and are part of the larger Austronesian ethnolinguistic group, with an Urheimat in Taiwan. They speak the Polynesian languages, a branch of the Oceanic subfamily within the Austronesian language family. The Indigenous Māori people form the largest Polynesian population, followed by Samoans, Native Hawaiians, Tahitians, Tongans, and Cook Islands Māori.

As of 2012, there were an estimated 2 million ethnic Polynesians (both full and part) worldwide. The vast majority either inhabit independent Polynesian nation-states (Samoa, Niue, Cook Islands, Tonga, and Tuvalu) or form minorities in countries such as Australia, Chile (Easter Island), New Zealand, France (French Polynesia and Wallis and Futuna), and the United States (Hawaii and American Samoa), as well as in the British Overseas Territory of the Pitcairn Islands. New Zealand had the highest population of Polynesians, estimated at 110,000 in the 18th century.

Polynesians have acquired a reputation as great navigators, with their canoes reaching the most remote corners of the Pacific and allowing the settlement of islands as far apart as Hawaii, Rapanui (Easter Island), and Aotearoa (New Zealand). The people of Polynesia accomplished this voyaging using ancient navigation skills, including reading stars, currents, clouds, and bird movements—skills that have been passed down through successive generations to the present day.

== Origins ==
The Polynesian spread of colonization of the Pacific throughout the so-called Polynesian Triangle.

Polynesians, including Samoans, Tongans, Niueans, Rotumans from Fiji, Cook Islands Māori, Tahitian Mā'ohi, Hawaiian Māoli, Marquesans, and New Zealand Māori, are a subset of the Austronesian peoples. They share the same origins as the indigenous peoples of Taiwan, Maritime Southeast Asia, Micronesia, and Madagascar. This is supported by genetic, linguistic and archaeological evidence.

Chronological dispersal of the Austronesian peoples

There are multiple hypotheses regarding the ultimate origin and mode of dispersal of the Austronesian peoples, but the most widely accepted theory is that modern Austronesians originated from migrations out of Taiwan between 3000 and 1000 BC. Using relatively advanced maritime innovations such as the catamaran, outrigger boats, and crab claw sails, they rapidly colonized the islands of both the Indian and Pacific oceans. They were the first humans to cross vast distances of water on ocean-going boats. Despite the popularity of rejected hypotheses, such as Thor Heyerdahl's belief that Polynesians are descendants of "bearded white men" who sailed on primitive rafts from South America, Polynesians are believed to have originated from a branch of the Austronesian migrations in Island Melanesia.

The direct ancestors of the Polynesians are believed to be the Neolithic Lapita culture. This group emerged in Island Melanesia and Micronesia around 1500 BC from a convergence of Austronesian migration waves, originating from both Island Southeast Asia to the west and an earlier Austronesian migration to Micronesia to the north. The culture was distinguished by dentate-stamped pottery. However, their eastward expansion halted when they reached the western Polynesian islands of Fiji, Samoa, and Tonga by around 900 BC. This remained the furthest extent of the Austronesian expansion in the Pacific for approximately 1,500 years, during which the Lapita culture in these islands abruptly lost the technology of pottery-making for unknown reasons. They resumed their eastward migrations around 700 AD, spreading to the Cook Islands, French Polynesia, and the Marquesas. From here, they expanded further to Hawaii by 900 AD, Easter Island by 1000 AD, and finally New Zealand by 1200 AD.

=== Genetic studies ===
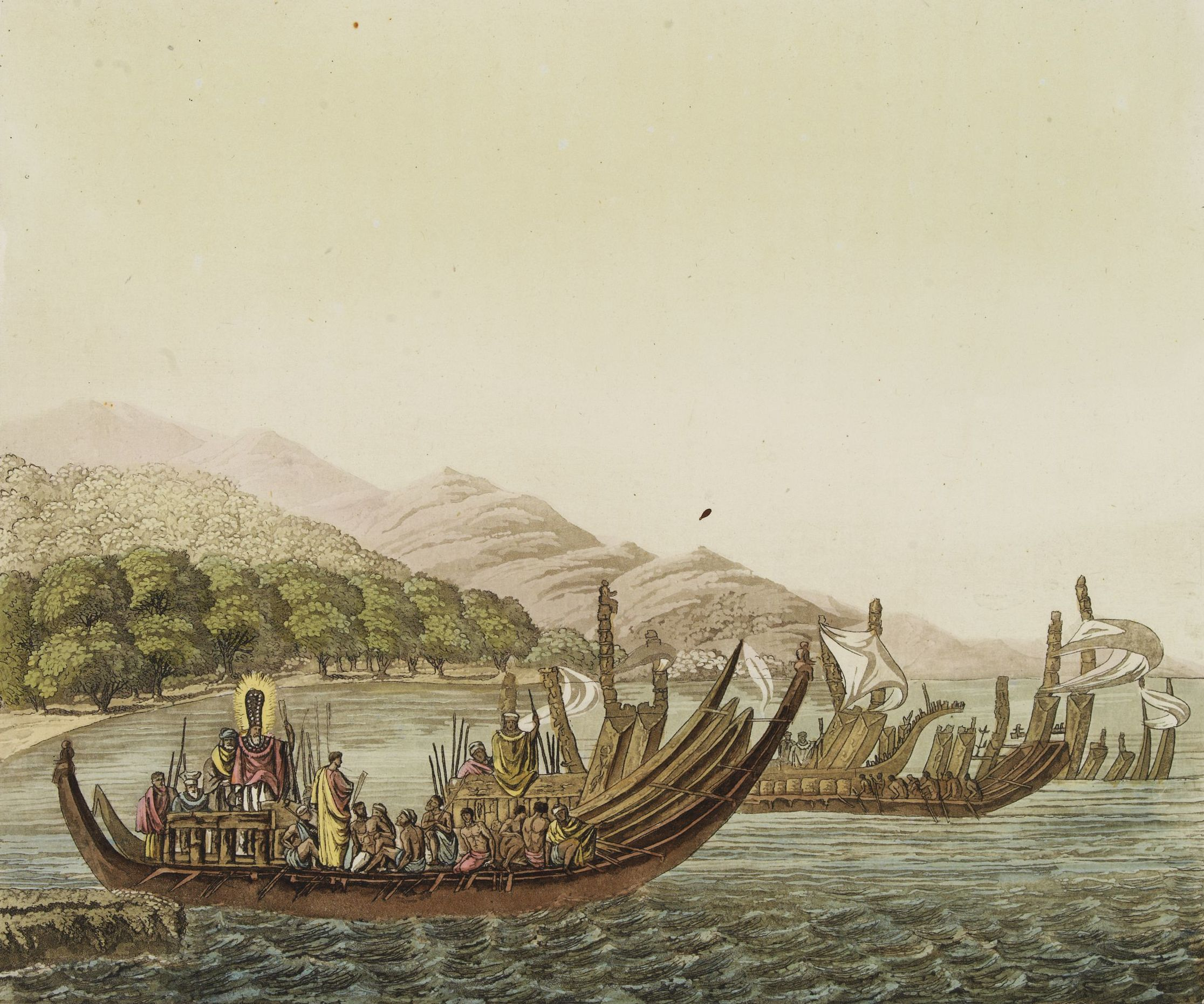
1827 depiction of Tahitian pahi double-hulled war canoes

Analysis by Kayser et al. (2008) found that only 21% of the Polynesian autosomal gene pool is of Australo-Melanesian origin, with the remaining 79% being of Austronesian origin. Another study by Friedlaender et al. (2008) also confirmed that Polynesians are genetically closer to Micronesians, Taiwanese Aborigines, and Islander Southeast Asians. The study concluded that Polynesians moved through Melanesia fairly rapidly, allowing only limited admixture between Austronesians and Papuans. Polynesians predominantly belong to Haplogroup B (mtDNA), particularly to mtDNA B4a1a1 (the Polynesian motif). The high frequencies of mtDNA B4 in Polynesians are the result of genetic drift and represent the descendants of a few Austronesian females who mixed with Papuan males. The Polynesian population experienced a founder effect and genetic drift due to the small number of ancestors. As a result of the founder effect, Polynesians are distinctively different both genotypically and phenotypically from the parent population, due to the establishment of a new population by a very small number of individuals from a larger population, which also causes a loss of genetic variation.

Soares et al. (2008) argued for an older pre-Holocene Sundaland origin in Island Southeast Asia (ISEA) based on mitochondrial DNA. The "out of Taiwan" model was challenged by a study from Leeds University published in Molecular Biology and Evolution. Examination of mitochondrial DNA lineages indicates that they have been evolving in ISEA for longer than previously believed. Ancestors of the Polynesians arrived in the Bismarck Archipelago of Papua New Guinea at least 6,000 to 8,000 years ago.

A 2014 study by Lipson et al., using whole genome data, supports the findings of Kayser et al. Modern Polynesians were shown to have lower levels of admixture with Australo-Melanesians than Austronesians in Island Melanesia. Nonetheless, both groups show admixture, along with other Austronesian populations outside of Taiwan, indicating varying degrees of intermarriage between the incoming Neolithic Austronesian settlers and the preexisting Paleolithic Australo-Melanesian populations of Island Southeast Asia and Melanesia.

Studies from 2016 and 2017 also support the idea that the earliest Lapita settlers mostly bypassed New Guinea, coming directly from Taiwan or the northern Philippines. The intermarriage and admixture with Australo-Melanesian Papuans evident in the genetics of modern Polynesians (as well as Islander Melanesians) occurred after the settlement of Tonga and Vanuatu.

A 2020 study found that Polynesians and the Indigenous peoples of South America came in contact around 1200 AD, centuries before Europeans interacted with either group.

== People ==
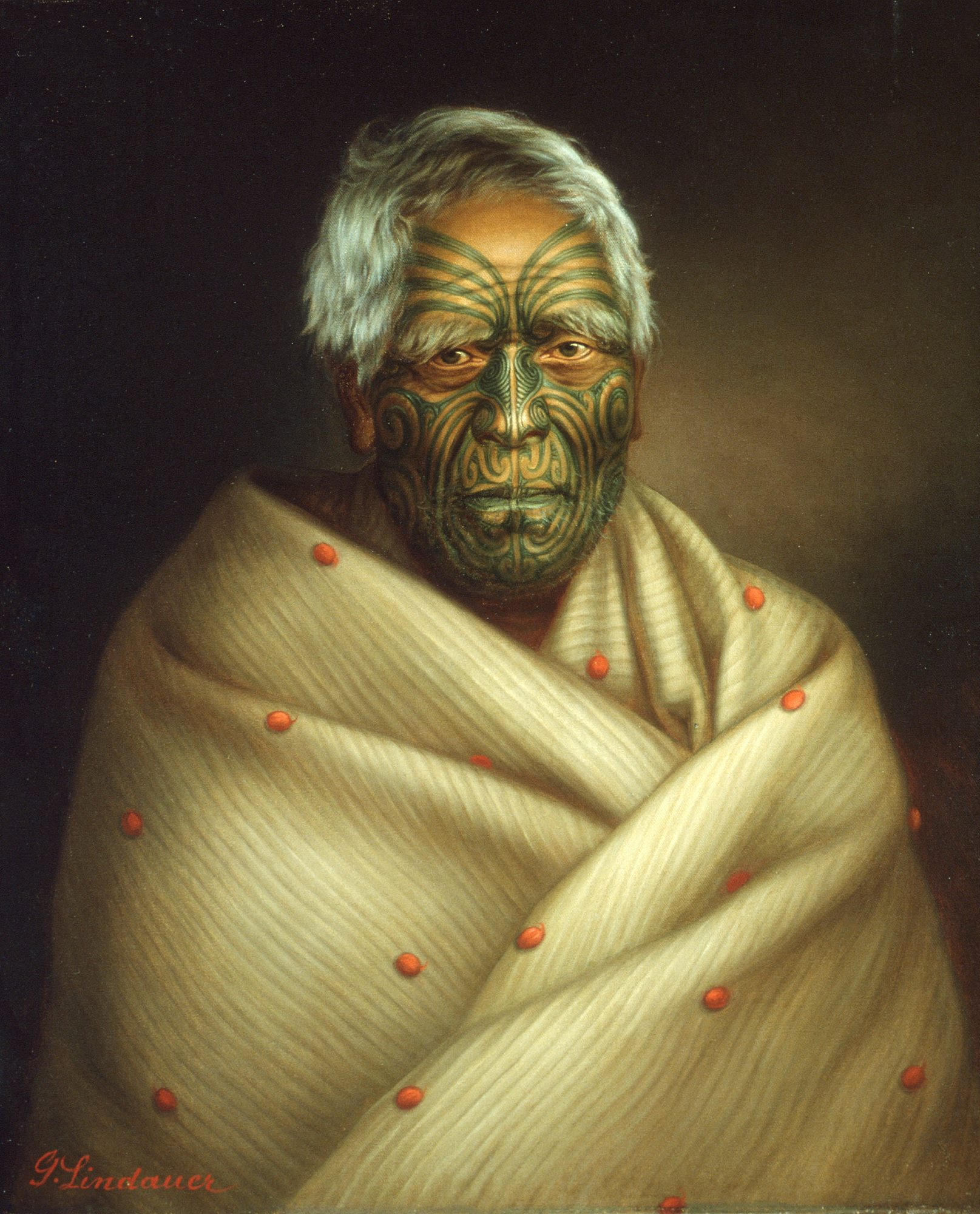
A portrait of Māori man, by Gottfried Lindauer.

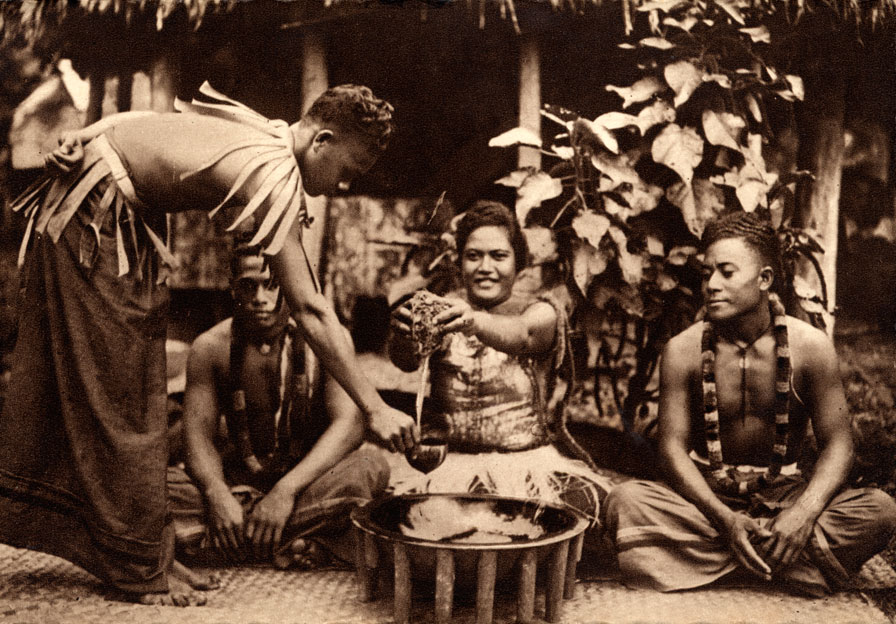
Kava ('ava) makers (aumaga) of Samoa. A woman seated between two men with the round tanoa (or laulau) wooden bowl in front. Standing is a third man, distributor of the 'ava, holding the coconut shell cup (tauau) used for distributing the beverage.

There are an estimated 2 million ethnic Polynesians and many of partial Polynesian descent worldwide, the majority of whom live in Polynesia, the United States, Australia, and New Zealand. The Polynesian peoples are listed below in their distinctive ethnic and cultural groupings, with estimates of the larger groups provided:

Polynesia:

- Māori: New Zealand (Aotearoa) – c. 892,200,(not including 170,057 residing in Australia, worldwide: c. 1,062,257)
- Samoans: Samoa, American Samoa – c. 249,000 (worldwide: c. 500,000 – c. 600,000, including the 109,000 residing in the US and 145,000 in New Zealand)
- Tahitians (Māohi): Tahiti – c. 178,000 (including multiracial: 250,000+)
- Hawaiians (Māoli): Hawaii – c. 140,000 (including multiracial: 400,000)
- Tongans: Tonga – c. 104,000 (worldwide: c. 300,000, including 43,465 residing in Australia, 67,221 in the US, and 82,839 in New Zealand)
- Cook Islands Māori: Cook Islands – 98,000+ (including 62,000 in New Zealand and 16,000 residing in Australia)
- Niueans: Niue – c. 20,000 – c. 25,000 (95% of whom live in New Zealand)
- Rotumans: Rotuma – c. 15,000 – c. 20,000 (5% reside on Rotuma Island, 75% live on mainland Fiji and 20% live elsewhere (specifically in Australia and New Zealand)
- Tuamotu: Tuamotu Archipelago – c. 16,000
- Tuvaluans: Tuvalu – c. 13,500 (including 3,500 diasporans in New Zealand)
- Marquesas Islanders: Marquesas Islands – c. 11,000
- Tokelauans: Tokelau – c. 8,000 (including 6,500 diasporans in New Zealand)
- Austral Islanders: Austral Islands – c. 7,000
- Rapanui: Easter Island – c. 5,000 (including mixtures and those living in Chile)
- Mangareva: Gambier Islands – c. 1,600
- Moriori: Chatham Islands (Rēkohu) – c. 738 (2013 New Zealand Census)
- Uvea and Futuna: Wallis and Futuna

Polynesian outliers:

- Kapingamarangi and Nukuoro: Federated States of Micronesia
- Nuguria, Nukumanu and Takuu: Papua New Guinea
- Anuta, Bellona, Ontong Java, Rennel, Sikaiana, Tikopia and Vaeakau-Taumako: Solomon Islands
- Emae, Makata, Mele (Erakoro, Eratapu), Aniwa, and Futuna: Vanuatu
- Fagauvea: Ouvéa (New Caledonia)
- Kioa (Fiji Islands)

== See also ==
- Austronesian peoples
- History of the Polynesian people
- Malagasy people
- Melanesians
- Micronesians
- Pacific Islander
- Pacific Islander Americans
- Polynesia
- Polynesian culture
- Polynesian languages
- Polynesian mythology
- Polynesian Society
- Taiwanese indigenous peoples
