= Niuatoputapu language =

Polynesian language spoken in Tonga

Niuatoputapu
- Native to: Tonga
- Extinct: 19th century
- Language family: Austronesian: Malayo-Polynesian; Oceanic; Polynesian; Nuclear Polynesian; Ellicean; Futunic; Niuatoputapu
- Writing system: Latin script

Language codes
- ISO 639-3: nkp
- Glottolog: niua1241
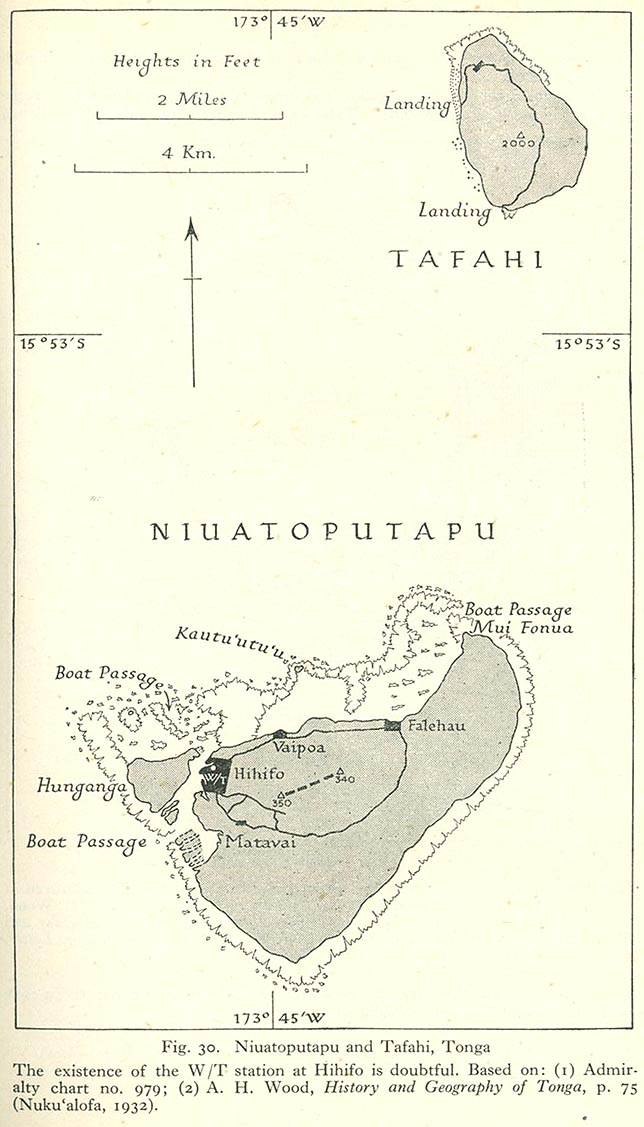
- Map of Niuatoputapu and Tafahi islands, where the language was spoken

- Niuatoputapu is classified as Extinct by the UNESCO Atlas of the World's Languages in Danger

The Niuatoputapu languague (Tongan: Lea Faka-Niuatoputapu) was a Polynesian language and the indigenous language of the people of Niuatoputapu, Tonga and possibly Tafahi, Tonga due to its close proximity. Sometime between the 18th to 19th century, it became extinct and its use was replaced by modern Tongan (Tongan: Lea Faka-Tonga), although small remnants of the old Niuatoputapu language can still be heard in the Tongan language spoken on Niuatoputapu and Tafahi today, as well as in the islands' geographic features. For example, the islet of Nukuseilala (Land of the Seilala Tree) appears to use the old Niuatoputapu and modern Samoan pronunciation of "seilala" instead of the modern Tongan "heilala".

The Niuatoputapu language is believed to have been very distinct from the modern Tongan and Niuafoʻou languages, being closely related instead to Samoan, East Futunan, Tokelauan, Tuvaluan and Pukapukan.

Practically all knowledge of the Niuatoputapu language comes from a word list of 32 words compiled by Jacob Le Maire in 1616 after visits to both Niuatoputapu and Tafahi.

== Vocabulary ==
The following is a list containing the original Dutch and Niuatoputapu words recorded by Le Maire in 1616. The table also notes the each word's equivalent in modern Dutch, English, and the most likely interpretations of the Niuatoputapu words compared to neighbouring islands and languages still spoken today.

Key / Legend
| = | same as |
| ? | unknown |

Le Maire's Worldist with Translations
| Middle/Early Modern Dutch | Modern Dutch | Niuatoputapu Words of Le Maire | Possible Niuatoputapu Interpretations | English |
|---|---|---|---|---|
| jaa | ja | da; ijto | io | yes |
| viſch, visch | vis | ica | ika | fish |
| vercken | varken | vvacka | puaka; vuaka | pig |
| hoen; kiecke | hoen; kuiken | omo | moa | chicken; fowl |
| vrouwe | vrouw | herri | fine; hine; fafine | woman; girl |
| viſhouck, vishouck | vishaak | matau | mātau; matau | fishhook |
| yser | ijzer | hakoubea | ukamea | iron |
| coralen | kralen | licaſoa; acachoa | kasoa; le kasoa | beads; made of beads; necklace |
| die | de | li | le | the |
| een | = | tacij, taci | tasi | one |
| twee | = | loua, loa | lua | two |
| drie | = | tolou | tolu | three |
| vier | = | fa | fā | four |
| vijf | = | lima | lima | five |
| thien | = | ougefoula | agafulu; ogofulu | ten |
| gaet wech | gaan | fanou | fano | to go |
| sieck | ziek | mataij | mate | sick, ill, dead |
| obos, oubeswortel | ? | oufij, oubi | ufi | yam |
| banannas | bananen | vvafoudgy | fuafuti; futi; vuavudi; vuafuti | bananas; plantains |
| cocos noten | kokosnoot | alieuw | niu | coconut |
| jonghe cocos | jonge kokosnoot | d'mauta | mata; niu mata; niu mātū | young coconut |
| wech; door | weg; door | alick-wi | ala ki | the way to; through |
| aen lant | op het land | ajouta; ajouda | uta; i uta; ki uta | on land; inland |
| overste | = | Latou | Lātū | boss; senior† |
| "Geeft my mijn obos" | "Geef mij mijn obos" | "Toma may oufi" | Taumai / aumai / omai ufi | Give me the/my yams |
| "Ee wortel soo genaemt /Rietachtich/ gemerbelt op die bast" | ? | acoua | kava | the kava plant/root |

*most other Polynesian languages from the area around Niuatoputapu and Tafahi agree on the words for 'pig' and 'banana' being a form of puaka and futi/fuafuti respectively, despite Le Maire's use of the 'v' sound when recording these words. While it may possibly be an error of Le Maire's, due to the islands' seemingly close physical position and historic association with Fiji, the Fijian pronunciations of vuaka for 'pig' and vudi or vua vudi for 'banana' must also be considered as possibly occurring in the Niuatoputapu language.

†while Le Maire's interpretation of "Latou" was a senior or leading member of the Niuatoputapu and Tafahi people, it is perhaps more accurately known as the title name "Lātū" traditionally granted to the chiefs of Niuatoputapu until it was abandoned in favour of the chiefly title "Maʻatu" from the island of ʻUvea (Wallis) by Puakaʻilakelo, son of Lātūmailangi who had met with Le Maire and his companion, Schouten, in 1616.

== Comparison with Futunan ==
Shortly after visiting Niuatoputapu and Tafahi islands, Le Maire and his expedition continued on to Futuna and Alofi islands of modern-day Wallis and Futuna where he recorded a larger list of words from the local Futunan language (Futunan: Le Māsau Fakafutuna) which is still spoken today. As the Futunan language is still in popular use in the 21st century, the Niuatoputapu and Futunan languages are believed to have been very close to each other, and both wordlists from Le Maire were collected within a short period of time, the Futunan language is able to offer perspective on the known aspects of the Niuatoputapu language and how they might look or might have sounded like. The table below offers a comparison between information about Le Maire's records, the Futunan language and the Niuatoputapu language.

Comparison of Niuatoputapu and Futunan Languages with Le Maire's Wordlists
| Dutch | Niuatoputapu of Le Maire | Futunan of Le Maire | Interpretation of Niuatoputapu & Futunan Words | English |
|---|---|---|---|---|
| een | tacij; taci | taci | tasi | one; 1 |
| twee | loua; loa | loua | lua | two; 2 |
| drie | tolou | tolou | tolu | three; 3 |
| vier | fa; d'fa | fa | fā | four; 4 |
| vijf | lima | lima | lima | five; 5 |
| ses | houw | houno | ono | six; 6 |
| thien | ougefoula | ongefoula | agafulu; ogofulu (nkp); kauagafulu (fud) | ten; 10 |
| vercken | vvacka | pouacca; puacca | puaka | pig |
| hoen; haen | omo | moa | moa | chicken |
| obos; oboswortel; oboswortelen | oufij; oubi | oufi | ufi | yam |
| banannas | vvafoudgy | fouti | fuafuti (nkp); futi | banana; plantain |
| "Ee wortel soo genaemt /Rietachtich/ gemerbelt op die bast"; "Een wortel die sy kauwen / en haer drant af maecken" | acoua | acava; atova; cava | kava | kava plant/root |
| coralen; cralen | licasoa; acachoa | casoa | kasoa | beads; necklace |
| yser | hackoubea | hackoumea | ukamea | iron |
| jaa; jae | ijto; da | yio; yjouw | io | yes |
