= Futunan language =

Polynesian language

Futunan
- Faka futuna
- Region: Futuna Island, Wallis and Futuna and New Caledonia
- Native speakers: New Caledonia: 3,900 (2014); Wallis and Futuna: 2,500 (2018)
- Language family: Austronesian: Malayo-Polynesian; Oceanic; Polynesian; Nuclear Polynesian; Futunan
- Early forms: Proto-Austronesian: Proto-Malayo-Polynesian; Proto-Oceanic; Proto-Polynesian; Proto-Nuclear Polynesian; Old Futunan
- Standard forms: Standard Futunan
- Dialects: Futunan dialects

Language codes
- ISO 639-3: fud
- Glottolog: east2447

Futunan or Futunian is the Polynesian language spoken on Futuna and nearby Alofi. The term East Futunan is also used to distinguish it from the related West Futunan (Futuna-Aniwa) spoken on the outlier islands of Futuna and Aniwa in Vanuatu.

The language is closely related to other Western Polynesian languages: Fagauvea, Wallisian, Tongan, Samoan, Tokelau, and Niuafoʻou.

This language is a member of the diminishing set of native Pacific languages. it is classified as endangered.

== History ==
King Sigave signed a treaty establishing a French protectorate on 16 February 1888, after being pressured by missionaries to do so. The islands were put under the authority of the French colony of New Caledonia. In 1917, the three traditional kingdoms of Wallis, Futuna and Alofi were annexed as colonies of France. In 1961 citizens voted on becoming a French overseas territory, legally unionizing Wallis and Futuna despite the fact that the islands are home to two distinct Polynesian societies with different cultures.

Despite being a French colony, Futunan remained relatively protected from the linguistic consequences of European language domination. The situation began to change around the Second World War when the numbers of speakers started to decline dramatically. A major event in the decline was the immigration of a large number of native Futunian speakers to New Caledonia. French has since enveloped Futunan in society, becoming the primary language used in grade schools. Futunans speak and use their language daily, mainly only using French in contact with European natives, or within the educational spheres. RFO-radio airs 15 minutes daily news broadcasts in Futunan.

== Phonology ==
The Futunan language has five vowels; /a, e, i, o, u/, which can be short or long. Long vowels are denoted by a macron: ā, ē, ī, ō, ū.

| | Front | Central | Back |
|---|---|---|---|
| High | i | | u |
| Mid | e | | o |
| Low | | a | |

Futunan has 11 consonants: 4 plosives /p, t, k, ʔ/; 3 nasals /m, n, ŋ/; 1 liquid /l/; and 3 fricatives /f, v, s/.

| | Labial | Alveolar | Velar | Glottal |
|---|---|---|---|---|
| Nasal | m | n | ŋ | |
| Plosive | p | t | k | ʔ |
| Fricative | f v | s | | |
| Approximant | | l | | |

The Futunan syllable structure is (C)V, examples: eio (yes), tauasu (meeting where one drinks kava), aua (particle of the negative imperative), etc.).

== Orthography ==
A prayer and catechism book written in Futunian produced by the Marist Fathers, 1880.

As Futunan natives did not have a writing system, the first documented written form of Futunian was a list of 118 words collected by William Schouten and Jacob Le Maire in 1616 during their visit to Futuna.

The first orthography for Futunan was developed by Isidore Grétzel, and was largely phonological, with vowel length indicated by a superscript dash (e.g. ā, ē, ī, ō, ū) and glottal stop by an apostrophe. This practice was then adopted and improved by Claire Moyse-Faurie, notably replacing the superscript denoting vowel length with a macron.

In the Futunan orthography nasal velar consonant [ŋ] is written as ⟨g⟩. This practice differs from the other Polynesian languages such as Tongan, where the said phoneme is written as ⟨ng⟩ (e.g. Tongan tangata vs. Futunan tagata, 'man').

=== Official vs. self-taught orthography ===
Despite the adoption of the Futunan orthography proposed by Moyse-Faurie for teaching and official uses, both Futunans and Wallisians use a different orthography. In daily life, the macron is usually omitted or replaced with a circumflex accent due to difficulties in typing these diacritics on an AZERTY keyboard. The apostrophe for glottal stop is also omitted, especially when located at the beginning of the word. Thus, the phrase mālō le ma’uli 'good morning' is often written as malo le ma’uli or even simply malo le mauli without any apostrophe at all. Claire Moyse-Faurie nevertheless believes that it is essential to note the vowel length and the glottal stroke in order to distinguish words correctly and avoid any confusion.

Similarly, the spacing of words differs between the official orthography and the majority usage of Futunans. For example, the official spelling separates prepositions from articles (ko le, i le, ki le), whereas self-taught orthography tends to use no spacing at all (kole, ile, kile).

== Grammar ==
=== Pronouns ===
The third person pronoun is now rarely used in Futunan. For all pronoun references, except third person singular, Futunan offers a choice of pre-posed and post-posed pronouns, which are pronouns placed before or after the subject. Modern Futunan has done away with the possibility of expressing pre-posed and post-posed pronouns. Clitic pronouns (clitic pronouns are dependent on an adjacent word and cannot stand on their own in meaning.) of the first and second type may correspond to different types of arguments: the absolute of intransitive clauses, the ergative of transitive clauses, and the absolute of transitive clauses. In some cases unique to the Polynesian language family, Futunan uses a pre-posed pronoun to refer to the patient of an ergative verb. In casual conversation the use of a pre-verbal pronoun can be rather frequent.

Futunan makes extensive syntactic use of pre-posed pronouns in conversation, where post-posed pronouns are used more in tails. Sentences containing post-posed pronouns only have two possible word orders: VAO (Verb, Adverb, Object) or VOA (Verb, Object, Adverb) (Example: etusiʻi a au e lātou ke kau ano o fakafofoga loku fā kolo i le aso o Toloke. "They represented me to go and represent the village at the festivities in Toloke"). Co-occurring clitic and post-posed pronouns seem to have given way to the unique occurrence of post-posed pronouns with similar focusing functions.

=== Verbs ===
The marker 'a' is required before definite plural nouns and noun phrases, post-verbal pronominals and proper nouns, however it is not required for phrases preceded by an article or possessive pronoun. The marker 'e' is used in front of ergative arguments. The markers 'i' and 'ki' cover a range of meanings and satisfy a range of conditions. Most commonly the objects of 'i' are obligatory, while only some objects of 'ki' are. They are used extensively as directional, causal, or instrumental case markers. They refer to destination, aim or purpose as well as verbs of feeling, address or sensation.

The verb classes consists of impersonal, intransitive (A/A + I), middle (A + Ki), transitive (A + E), "AA + E", "AA + I" or AA + E" verbs. most AA + I and A + E verbs undergo derivation to change their argument structure. Futunan has single, double and triple argument structures. Suffixes 'i' and 'ki' are used to derive verbs, the only productive suffix is 'a' which means "be full of". If an absolute argument in a sentence with a non-derived verb represents an agent, it will be marked as an ergative, and a patient will be added in the absolute case. (Example: "kutu" means lice; "kutu-a" means be covered with lice). If an absolutive argument represents a patient in a sentence with a derived verb, it will contain an additional ergative argument. (Example: "lamata" means tame, "faka-lamata" means be tamed by). In the case of middle verbs with two arguments verb derivation results in the experiencer being placed in the ergative, and the argument placed in the absolutive.

== See also ==
- 'Aliki
