= Sikaiana language =

Polynesian language

Sikaiana
- Native to: Solomon Islands
- Region: Sikaiana
- Native speakers: (730 cited 1999)
- Language family: Austronesian: Malayo-Polynesian; Oceanic; Polynesian; Ellicean; Sikaiana

Language codes
- ISO 639-3: sky
- Glottolog: sika1261

Sikaiana is a Polynesian language, spoken by about 730 people on Sikaiana in Solomon Islands.

== Introduction ==
=== History ===
According to legend, the island was founded by Tui Atafu, who killed off all the indigenous people and proclaimed himself chief. Some say that Tui Atafu was from an island called Atafu in the Tokelau islands, while others speculate he came from Tonga. But later, Sikaiana was invaded by Tongans, leaving many people who lived on Sikaiana dead. In the late 1920s ritual houses were burned and missionaries from the Melanesian Mission came to Sikaiana and completely converted almost everyone on the island to Christianity. They burnt down the ritual houses because they believed that people would still have faith in other religions if it were still there. The people were eager to learn to read and write since it offered educational and employment opportunities off the island, which helped contribute to the success of the missionaries (Donner, 2012).

=== Population ===
Sikaiana is a Polynesian outlier language spoken on Sikaiana atoll in the Central Province of Solomon Islands, about ninety miles east of the Malaita Island in Polynesia. There are about 730 speakers of this language in the world.

=== Classification ===
Sikaiana is an Austronesian language in the Ellicean family. Its sister languages include Kapingamarangi, Nukumanu, Nukuoro, Nukuria, Ontong Java, Takuu, and Tuvaluan.

== Phonology ==
=== Consonants ===
Consonants
	Labial	Alveolar	Velar	Glottal
Nasal	m	n		
Plosive	p	t	k	
Fricative	v	s		h ~ f (Note: In most situations, [h] and [f] are in free variation, but in many words, only [h] can be used (Donner 2012).)
Lateral		l		

Sikaiana uses nine different consonants which are reflexes of the Proto-Polynesian language. The consonants include /p/, /t/, /k/, /f~h/, /v/, /s/, /m/, /n/, and /l/. In most situations, [h] and [f] are in free variation, but in many words, only [h] can be used (Donner 2012). There is also a length distinction for consonants. This sometimes occurs as a result of a non-pronunciation of a vowel. For example, hahai changes to hhai because the first /a/ is simply omitted. Double consonants can also be used as a form of reduplication, showing agreement in verbs with plural subjects, or to mark repeated actions (Donner 2012).

=== Vowels ===
Vowels
	Short		Long	
	Front	Back	Front	Back
Close	i	u	iː	uː
Mid	e	o	eː	oː
Open	a		aː	

There are five vowel phonemes in Sikaiana which include /a/, /e/, /i/, /o/, and /u/. The phonemes /u/ and /i/ are realized as the glides [w] and [j] respectively, usually when preceding /a/. Like the consonants, the vowel phonemes are all reflexes from the Proto-Polynesian language. Vowel length is distinctive in Sikaiana. For example, the word for ‘shell tool’ is aha, while the word for ‘cyclone’ is ahaa. Such a slight difference in the pronunciation can make a big difference in the meaning of the word, although some native speakers who were born after World War II don't know what the original forms of the words are (Donner 1996).

== Grammar ==
=== Basic word order ===
The basic constituent order for Sikaiana is subject–verb–object word order. Although the order may vary, this pattern is always used for short, simple statements. Object subject verb and object verb subject are not used in any oceanic language, which means that it will not be used in Sikaiana (Lichtenberk, 2012). In the Sikaiana grammar system, sentences that start with a noun usually do not lead with a preposition, but for noun phrases that follow a verb phrase, it may or may not lead with a preposition (Donner, 2012). As for nouns and noun phrases, there must always be a preceding article except if it is a noun of place, names, or free pronouns. The articles that usually precede a noun are either te or n. The use of these articles makes nouns easily distinguishable from other parts of speech (Donner, 2012).

=== Morphology ===
Sikaiana uses extensive morphology to transform words to better express more complex sentences. Like many other Polynesian languages, Sikaiana has two types of nominal possession markers. There is an alienable marker which is a, and an inalienable marker, o. Pronominal possessive markers differ slightly. The alienable marker for a pronoun is ana and the inalienable possession marker is ona. Pronouns in Sikaiana include singular, first person inclusive, first person exclusive, second person, and third person. In order to nominalize verbs in Sikaiana, the suffix ana is added to a verb to nominalize it. There are also length distinction morphemes used. For example, taku means ‘my’, and takuu means ‘axe’.

== Vocabulary ==
Sikaiana is very similar to the Proto-Polynesian language, so many words that are present in Polynesian languages are also in the Sikaiana language. For example, hale in Sikaiana means house, and the same word is also house in Hawaiian.

== Endangerment ==
=== Vitality ===
The people of Sikaiana speak the Sikaiana language or Central Solomon Pidgin English. After WWII, many people from Sikaiana migrated to Honiara, the capital of the Solomon Islands, in search of jobs and education (Donner, 2002). This means that there was a decrease in the use of the language, since Sikaiana was not the language mainly used in that area. A decrease in the advantages of using the Sikaiana language increases the endangerment of it.

=== Materials ===
Although there is a decrease in the number of speakers of the Sikaiana language, there is a dictionary which was put together by Arthur Capell in 1935 which covers vocabulary, grammar, typology, and a brief history of the Sikaiana language. It may be possible for someone to learn how to speak Sikaiana if they read and study the entire dictionary. Some other sources are by William Donner, who visited Sikaiana in the 1970s and 1980s, and wrote many papers regarding history, language change, culture, and emigration of the Sikaiana people. Most of Donner's work was published in the journal Pacific Studies.
