= Atolls Rural LLG =

Local-level government in Papua New Guinea

- Atolls Rural LLG in the Autonomous Region of Bougainville
- Country: Papua New Guinea
- Province: Autonomous Region of Bougainville
- District: North Bougainville District

Population (2011 census)
  - Total: 2,900
- Time zone: UTC+11 (BST)

Atolls Rural LLG is a local-level government (LLG) of the Autonomous Region of Bougainville, Papua New Guinea.

== Wards ==
- 01. Carterets
- 02. Tasman
- 03. Mortlock
- 04. Nuguria
