= Wallisian language =

Polynesian language spoken in Wallis island

Wallisian
- Fakaʻuvea
- Native to: Wallis and Futuna, France
- Native speakers: (10,400 cited 2000)
- Language family: Austronesian: Malayo-Polynesian; Oceanic; Polynesian; Nuclear Polynesian; Wallisian
- Early forms: Proto-Austronesian: Proto-Malayo-Polynesian; Proto-Oceanic; Proto-Polynesian; Proto-Nuclear Polynesian; Old Wallisian
- Standard forms: Standard Wallisian
- Dialects: Wallisian dialects

Language codes
- ISO 639-3: wls
- Glottolog: wall1257
- Wallisian is not endangered according to the classification system of the UNESCO Atlas of the World's Languages in Danger

Sample of a woman speaking French and Wallisian

Wallisian, or ʻUvean (Wallisian: Fakaʻuvea), is the Polynesian language spoken on Wallis Island (also known as ʻUvea). The language is also known as East Uvean to distinguish it from the related West Uvean language spoken on the outlier island of Ouvéa near New Caledonia. The latter island was colonised from Wallis Island in the 18th century.

Indigenous to Wallis island, the language is also spoken in New Caledonia since the 1950s due to a migration of many Wallisians (especially in Nouméa, Dumbéa, La Foa, and Mont Dore). According to the CIA World Factbook, it had 7,660 speakers in 2015. However, Livingston (2016) states that the actual number of speakers is much higher (around 20,000), albeit difficult to count precisely.

The closest language to Wallisian is Niuafoʻou. It is also closely related to Tongan, though part of the Samoic branch, and has borrowed extensively from Tongan due to the Tongan invasion of the island in the 15th and 16th centuries. Uvea was settled about 3,000 years ago.

== Alphabet ==
Consonants
	Labial	Alveolar	Velar	Glottal
Nasal	m	n	ŋ ⟨g⟩	
Plosive	p	t	k	ʔ ⟨ʻ⟩
Fricative	f v	s		h
Approximant		l		

Vowels
	Front		Central		Back	
	short	long	short	long	short	long
High	i	iː ⟨ī⟩			u	uː ⟨ū⟩
Mid	e	eː ⟨ē⟩			o	oː ⟨ō⟩
Low			a	aː ⟨ā⟩		

Wallisian has 10 vowels: the standard 5 vowels: /a, e, i, o, u/ and their lengthened variants: ā, ē, ī, ō, ū.

=== Writing ===
The letter ʻ, representing the glottal stop (see ʻokina), is known in Wallisian as fakamoga (faka: causative prefix, moga: Adam's apple). The fakamoga can be written with straight, curly or inverted curly apostrophes. Similarly the macron (Wallisian: fakaloa, 'to lengthen') is used to mark long vowels but isn't always written.

For example: Mālō te maʻuli (hello) can be written Malo te mauli.

Wallisian was only an oral language until contact with Westerners. The first Wallisian vocabulary was created by French missionary Pierre Bataillon in 1840 and revised in 1871 but published only in 1932. German linguist Karl Rensch used Bataillon's work as the basis for his 1984 Wallisian-French dictionary, in which he chose not to use the macron.

== Vocabulary ==
Phoneme correspondences
Phoneme	Proto-Polynesian	Samoan	Tongan	Niuafo'ou	East Futunan	Wallisian	West Uvean	English
/ŋ/	*taŋata	tagata	tangata	tangata	tagata	tagata	tagata	man, person
/s/	*sina	sina	hina		sina	hina	sina	grey (of hair)
/ti/	*tiale	tiale	siale	siale	tiale	siale	tiale, tiare	flower (Gardenia Taitensis)
/k/	*waka	vaʻa	vaka	vaka	vaka	vaka	vaka	canoe
/f/	*fafine	fafine	fefine	fafine	fafine	fafine	fafine	woman
/ʔ/	*matuqa	matua	motuʻa	matua		matuʻa		parent
/r/	*rua	lua	ua	ua, lua	lua	lua	lua	two
/l/	*tolu	tolu	tolu	tolu	tolu	tolu	tolu	three

=== Registers ===
In Wallisian, there are three registers: the honorific language is used by both commoners and royals themselves. The royalty use it as it is the chiefly language and the commoners use it when talking to either a royal or when talking to God. The honorific language is also used by commoners when talking about God or about a royal figure regardless of their presence. The second language is the commoner language which is what is considered “ordinary” Wallisian, and finally, there is vulgar or derogatory language. For example, the word for “to remain” in honorific, commoner, and vulgar registers are respectively ‘afio, nofo, & tagutu. Each of the three are used in their respective circumstances.

== History and classification ==
Wallisian comes from Proto-Polynesian and belongs to the Nuclear Polynesian subgroup (map). However, due to its massive Tongan influence, it has been sometimes classified as a Tongic language.

Wallisian is a Polynesian language that comes from Proto-Polynesian. However, its classification has been a subject of debate among scholars. Due to its proximity with Tongan language, Wallisian has sometimes been classified within the Tongic subgroup (Elbert, 1953), but later linguists stated it belonged to the Nuclear Polynesian group: Pawley and Green (1966), Bruce Biggs (1978) and Jeffrey Marck (2000).

The closest language to Wallisian is the language of the northern Tongan island of Niuafoʻou. Intercomprehension is very high between those two languages, due to intense contacts between both islands until the mid-20th century.

== Influence from other languages ==
=== Influence from Tongan ===
Wallisian is related to Rennellese. It is also closely related to Tongan, owing to the influence of the Tuʻi Tonga Empire. For instance, the past form ne'e comes from Tongan. Wallisian is very closely related to Tongan, while Futunan is more closely related to Samoan.

=== Influence from English ===
During the 19th century, a form of pidgin English was used by Wallisians to communicate with traders, mainly due to the fact that the natives of Wallis and Futuna had a lot of contact with New England whaling ships as they frequently stopped at Wallis and Futuna. Currently, there are about 70 pidgin words that are still in use in Wallisian. In 1937 however, an infestation of coconut beetles on Wallis island scared away many of the island's trade partners of mainly English origin. Trade to Fiji, for example, was halted because of the infestation. Loanwords include European foods (laisi "rice", suka "sugar") and objects (pepa "paper"), but also some animals (hosi "horse").

Influence from English grew stronger after the American army set a military base on the island in 1942. Loanwords such as puna ("spoon"), motoka ("car", from motor car), famili ("family"), peni ("pen") and tini ("tin") have also entered the Wallisian language.

=== Influence from Latin ===
When the missionaries came, they also introduced many Latin words, mainly for religious purposes. Jesus Christ was rendered as Sesu Kilisito, words like komunio ("communion"), kofesio ("confession"), temonio ("devil", from demonio, fr démon), but also some non religious vocabulary: hola "time, hour" (lat. hora); hisitolia "history" (Lat. historia) were introduced and are now part of the everyday Wallisian language. Not all religious words have been borrowed, though. Missionaries also tried to use existing concepts in Wallisians and give them a new Christian meaning. Thus Tohi tapu ("sacred book") refers to the Bible, while aho tapu ("holy day") means Sunday, and Po Tapu ("sacred night") is Christmas; the concept of Trinity was translated into Tahitolu tapu, which literally translates to "one-three holy". Missionaries also introduced the days of the week into the language, using the Latin ecclesiastical style of naming weekdays with feria (transliterated as felia), much like in Portuguese.

Claire Moyse-Faurie explains that in Wallisian, "loanwords conform to the syllabic structure by inserting an epenthetic vowel into the cluster and by either adding a final vowel or eliminating the final consonant".

=== Influence from French ===
Wallisian has been heavily influenced by French. French missionaries arrived at the end of the 19th century; in 1961, Wallis and Futuna became a French overseas territory and French is now the official language.

In 1984, linguist Karl Rensch noted the increasing use of French loanwords in Wallisian. Many neologisms have been created by transliterating French words into Wallisian, as in the vocabulary of politics. Words such as Falanise ("France"), telituale ("territory"), politike, ("politics"), lepupilika ("republic"), many technical words (e.g. telefoni, televisio) and food that was brought in Wallis by the Europeans (tomato, tapaka "tobacco", from Fr. tabac, alikole ("alcohol"), kafe "coffee", from Fr. café) are borrowings from French.

In the 2000s, young people have started mixing both languages in their speech.

-French influence in Uvea can be seen through media and in schools. French was even implemented as a primary and secondary school language since 1961, reinforcing the French governmental dominance over the island. During the year 1968–9 when a Wallisian was caught speaking in his native language in school they would be forced to wear a tin corned beef lid as a necklace and then write an hour-long French composition during the weekend marked by the French teacher. When the next student was to be caught speaking Wallisian then the necklace would be passed on to them but whoever holds the necklace will have to wear it until someone else is caught speaking their suppressed native language.

Due to the French influence on Wallis island about half of the media is in French and constantly available while for example some news stations and television programs in Wallisian are only available once a week and are usually at the end of the week which discourages people from watching them since they would have already seen the news earlier in the week. This only leads to people interacting more with the French language and feeling more discouraged to learn Wallisian. Some parents even discourage the learning of Wallisian in nursery and primary schools calling the language a waste of time to learn.

=== Relationships between Wallisian and Futunan ===
Despite being two different Polynesian languages, Wallisian and Futunan are similar enough to one another that knowing one language makes it much easier to learn the other as well.

Many Wallisians see themselves as superior to Futunans, such as reinforcing stereotypes claiming that Wallisian is easy while Futunan is a difficult language to pronounce. These stereotypes arise from the fact that since Wallis island was chosen as the administrative center for the French and as the seat of the Catholic bishop. Wallis island enjoyed more benefits from France and hence Wallisian became dominant to Futunan, especially since Futuna island lacked the educational resources that Wallis island could provide in the 1990s. A highly educated Futunan is typically expected to be trilingual in French, Futunan, and Wallisian. Only by being trilingual in all three can a Futunan retain the pride of Futuna island while being able to have the opportunity to advance economically and educationally on Wallis island.

=== The language debate: the Church and the French administration ===
The natives of Wallis islands and Futuna were able to get very close to the Catholic missionaries as the missionaries stayed, learned the native languages Wallisian and Futunan, and the missionaries created schools in order to educate the young and encourage young men to join the priesthood. The natives of the islands had a poor relationship with administrative officials since administrators only stay for two to three years before being moved elsewhere, this causes administrators to typically not learn local languages as they had very little use for it being exposed for such a relatively short period of time compared to the missionaries. The natives being close to the Catholics however caused the locals to begin learning Latin words which they began to incorporate into their own language, especially in religious settings.

This rift between the clergy and the administration was seen all the way in France where anticlericalism was widespread. French politicians and church officials had been having difficulties agreeing with one another. The clergy for example found very little to no reason to impose the French language on the natives of Wallis and Futuna, however, Paris demanded that the islands learn the language and an agreement between French politicians and the Catholic church was made. French would be taught two hours a day, four times a week, and as long as French classes did not interfere with Catholic studies. In 1959 when the islands of Wallis and Futuna joined the French republic as an overseas territory the educational system changed dramatically. The Catholic church lost control of the educational system to the French politicians who ordered teachers of the French language from France to teach French on the islands. Most of these teachers had very little experience teaching French as a second language and the change in the educational system led to a sociolinguistic split, younger generations became more or less bilingual while the older generations had a very little grasp of the French language. French teachers on the Wallis and Futuna islands were in a similar position as the French administrators. French teachers only taught for two to three years before their teaching contract ended and they are moved elsewhere.

Having similar opinions to the priests the French teachers were asked about their experience when returning to France and they usually said that teaching French on the islands was a waste of time as only few people saw the need for the locals to become fluent in French. As the debates over how the people should be educated continued, Wallisians realized the cultural importance of their language and found a new desire to protect it by attempting to standardize the language, creating social media/entertainment in Wallisian rather than in French (despite the fact that most media comes from France), and by making Wallisian a school subject.

As the French missionaries arrived in 1837 spreading Latin language, the natives became wary of a loss of Wallisian culture. The natives of Wallis island began to have Wallisian classes for middle school children, and when the community obtained FM and AM transmitters in 1979, the community began operating radio channels specifically in Wallisian.

== See also ==
- 'Aliki

== Bibliography ==
- Livingston, Andrew (2016). East Uvean. A condensed grammar (PDF) (master's thesis in linguistics). University of Washington. p. 190.
- Moyse-Faurie, Claire (2016). Te lea faka'uvea - le wallisien. Les langues du monde (in French). Peeters. p. 276. ISBN 978-90-429-3376-7.
