= Takuu Atoll =

Atoll in Papua New Guinea

Nukutoa Island
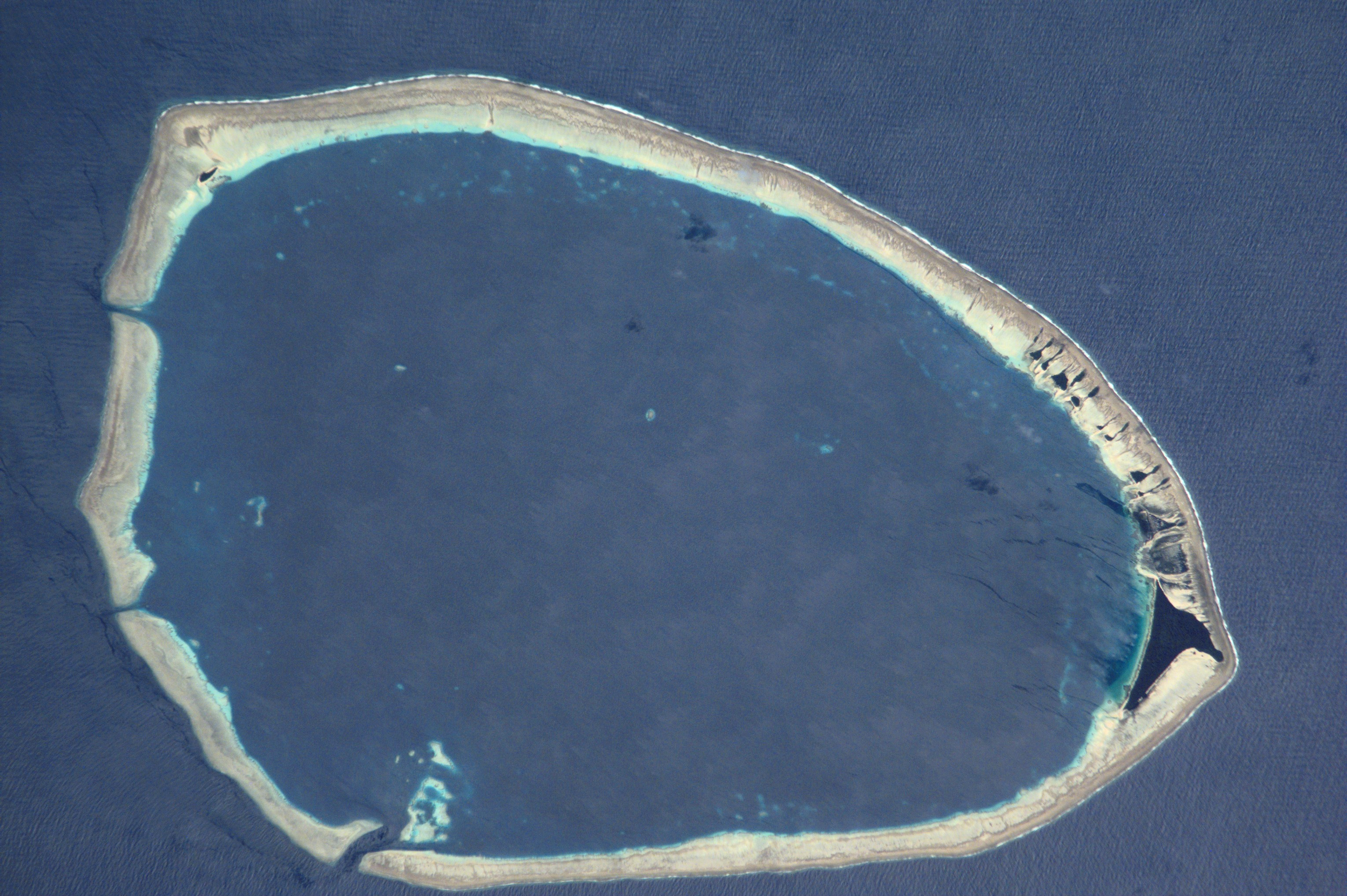
- NASA picture of Nukutoa Island

- Location within Papua New Guinea

Geography
- Location: Pacific Ocean
- Coordinates: 4°45′S 156°59′E
- Total islands: 13
- Length: 14.9 km (9.26 mi)
- Width: 12.5 km (7.77 mi)
- Highest elevation: 2 m (7 ft)

Administration
- Papua New Guinea
- Autonomous Region: Bougainville
- District: North Bougainville
- Local-level government: Atolls Rural
- Largest settlement: Nukutoa

Demographics
- Population: 600

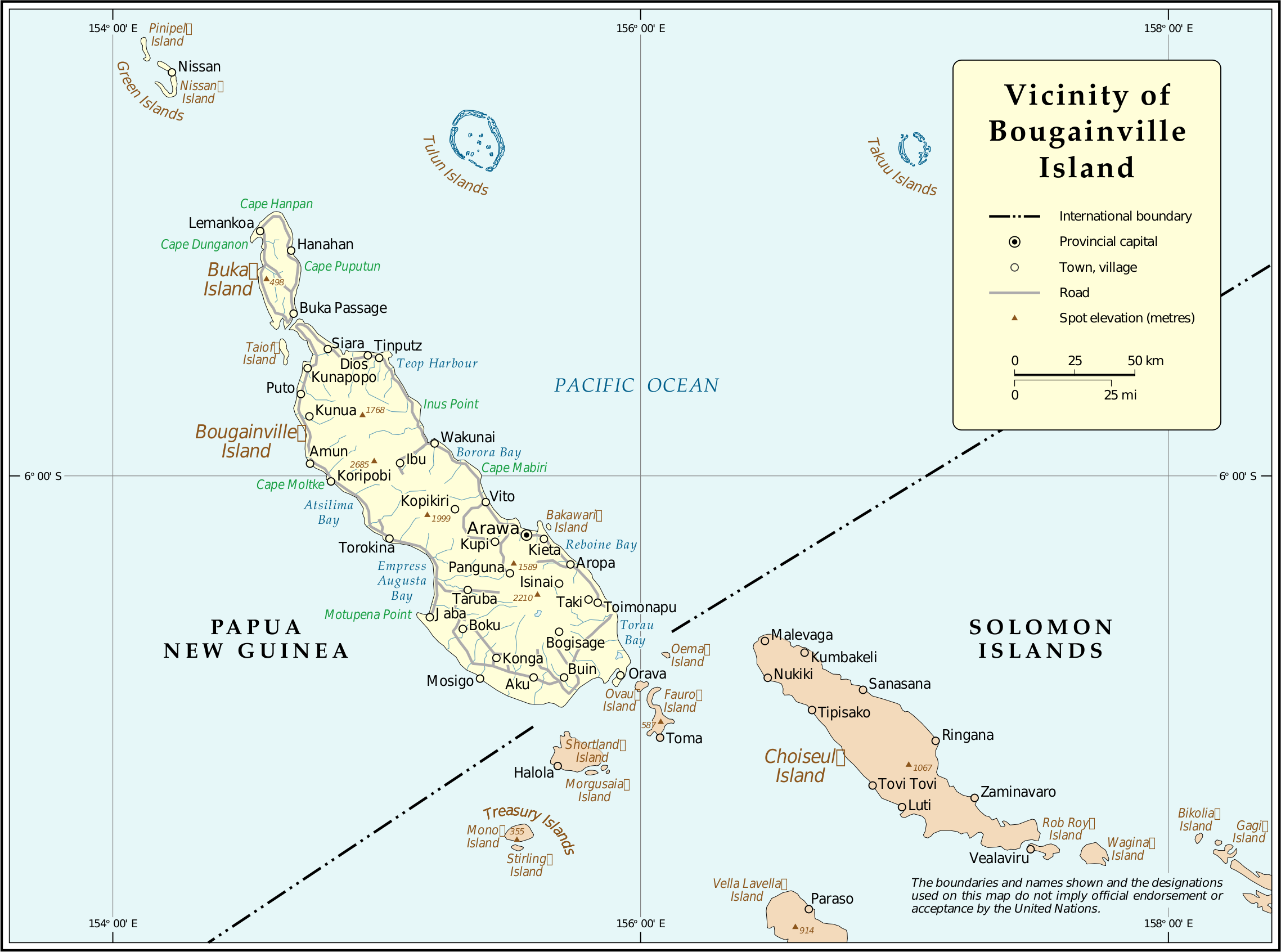
District map of Bougainville (North Solomons)

Takuu, formerly known as Tauu and also known as Nukutoa, Mortlock Island, or Marqueen Island, is a small, isolated atoll off the east coast of Bougainville Island in Papua New Guinea.

== Geography ==
Takuu lies about 250 km (160 mi) to the northeast of Kieta, a city on the east coast of Bougainville. The atoll consists of about 13 islands to the east and one island to the northwest. Its position is 4°45′S 157°2′E. Takuu Island is the southernmost and largest of the islands on the eastern side of the atoll. Most of the population, however, lives on the small neighbouring island of Nukutoa.

The islands in the atoll are very low-lying, about a metre (three feet) above the high tide mark. A local rise in sea level has been noticed by the people of Takuu and by Richard Moyle, a University of Auckland ethnomusicologist who studied the atoll for 17 years. It is, however, much lower than the publicised 20 centimetres (7.9 in) a year. Two scientists (Scott Smithers and John Hunter) who visited the atoll in November and December 2008 found no evidence that it was sinking due to tectonic activity.

While the atoll is likely to persist physically for some time, a variety of problems, apparently related to climate change and the political situation, are making life on Takuu very difficult. Moyle has predicted that climate change will eventually extinguish the atoll's ability to sustain life. "Takuu families living elsewhere in Papua New Guinea will take in as many as they can, but with no single resettlement location, I can't see Takuu continuing to function as a community" (Moyle, quoted in Wane 2005:10).

== Population and culture ==
The islands are inhabited by approximately 400 people of Polynesian origin. Takuu is one of the Polynesian outlier cultures situated outside the Polynesian Triangle. The people of Takuu have traditionally placed great value on the retention of their indigenous practices and religious sites. To protect Takuu from outside influences, the Ariki (chief) banned Christian missionaries for around 25 years, during which only four researchers were permitted to spend time on the islands. The ban was lifted in more recent years as young islanders who had lived and studied on the Papua New Guinea mainland returned to their homeland, and a number of churches have since been established on Nukutoa.

Traditional life continues on Takuu. Thatched houses stand in crowded rows, so close together that the eaves almost touch. There are few trees on the island apart from coconut palms, and the main street serves as a marae, a space for ritual ceremonies. Music remains a fundamental part of life on Takuu. Because of the long period of isolation, many indigenous songs, stories and dances have survived. Many of the songs date from before European contact, which occurred in the mid-19th century. The songs tell stories of voyages between the islands, while "dance performances fill 20 or 30 hours a week" (Wane 2005).

Many of the songs celebrate successful relationships, whether those linking extended families in productive activity or those binding people with their ancestors in times of need. Much as hula functions as a narrative medium in Hawaiian tradition, Takuu song serves a similar role, with performances conveying histories, genealogies and inter-island connections across generations.

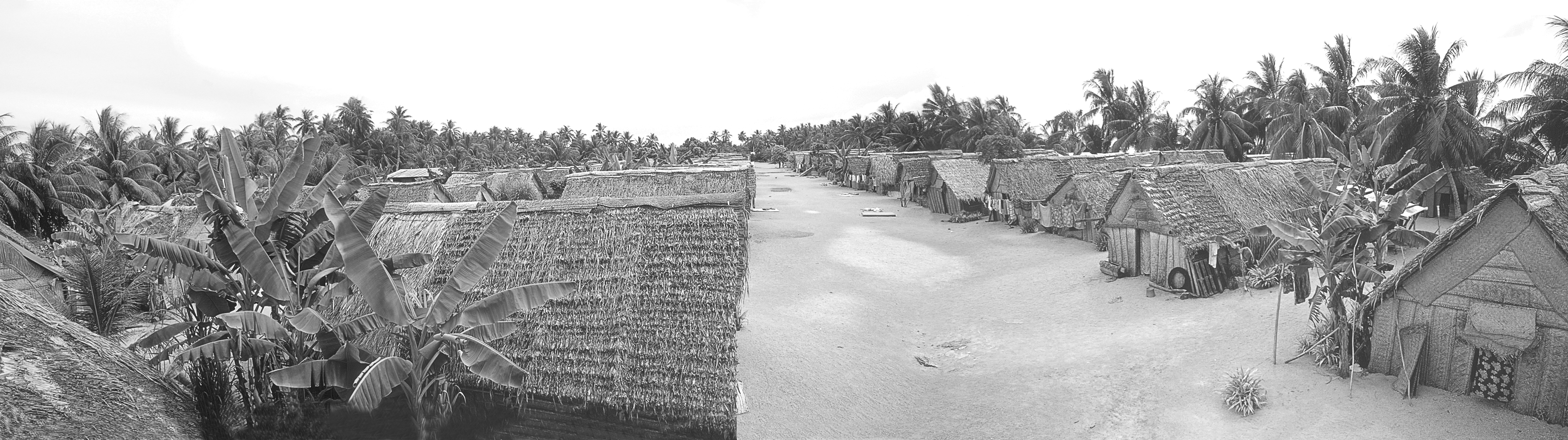
Nukutoa village, Takuu, 2000. Photo:Hamish McDonald

== Documentary ==
In 2006, filmmakers Briar March and Lyn Collie made the first of two visits to Takuu, producing a documentary recording culture and daily life on the atoll and examining the possibility that the community might need to relocate to the Bougainville mainland if conditions worsened. Scientists Scott Smithers and John Hunter accompanied the second shoot in 2008. The film was released in 2010 as There Once was an Island: Te Henua a Nnoho.

== Language ==
The people of Takuu speak Takuu, a Polynesian language. Recent classifications of the Polynesian languages place the language in an Ellicean branch, along with Nukuoro, Kapingamarangi, Nukuria, Nukumanu, Luangiua, and Sikaiana. Twentieth-century classifications had placed these languages in a Samoic Outlier group.

| | Takuu | Samoan | Tokelauan | Rarotongan | Māori | Hawaiian |
|---|---|---|---|---|---|---|
| sky | /ɾani/ | /laŋi/ | /laŋi/ | /ɾaŋi/ | /ɾaŋi/ | /lani/ |
| north wind | /tokoɾau/ | /toʔelau/ | /tokelau/ | /tokeɾau/ | /tokeɾau/ | /koʔolau/ |
| woman | /ffine/ | /fafine/ | /fafine/ | /vaʔine/ | /wahine/ | /wahine/ |
| house | /faɾe/ | /fale/ | /fale/ | /ʔaɾe/ | /ɸaɾe/ | /hale/ |
| parent | /maːtua/ | /matua/ | /maːtua/ | /metua/ | /matua/ | /makua/ |
| mother | /tinna/, /tinnaː/ | /tinaː/ | /maːtua/ | /maːmaː/ | /ɸaea/ | /makuahine/ |
| father | /tama/, /tamana/ | /tamaː/ | /tama/, /tamana/ | /metua/, /paːpaː/ | /matua/, /paːpaː/ | /makua kaːne/ |
| canoe | /te vaka/ | /vaʔa/ | /te vaka/ | /vaka/, /vaka ama/ | /waka ama/ | /waʔa/ |

== Economy ==
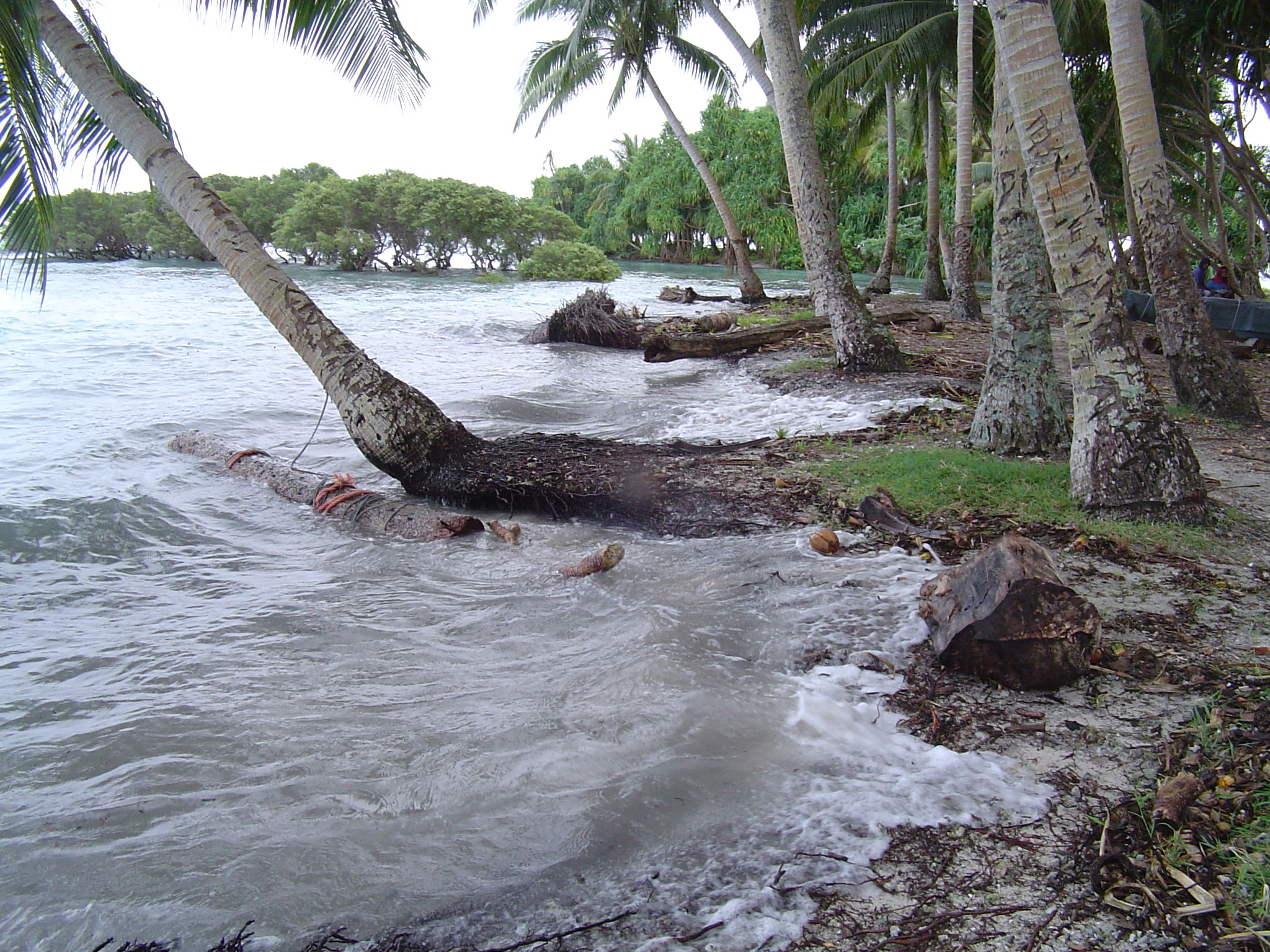
High tide threatens Nukutoa island, Takuu

The local economy depends on agriculture and fishing. In recent years, the cultivation of food plants has grown steadily more difficult as the fresh water table becomes contaminated by sea water. Some of the traditional taro gardens have salt water flowing into them at high tide, which kills the crop. As a result, the returns from cultivation are diminishing and the people have been forced to appeal to the Papua New Guinea and Bougainville Regional governments for assistance. In 2001, the community faced a time of great deprivation and hunger when the supply ship that regularly visited the islands was laid up for six months for repairs, with such delays not being uncommon.

In early 2006 a cyclone devastated the islands and added to their already compromised situation. In December 2008, a series of tidal surges at high tide over three days washed away kitchens, flooded homes and destroyed a number of churches, terrifying the people. The service boat was unable to come for several weeks afterwards, leaving the community without supplies. It appears that some of the community are now looking to relocate permanently to the Bougainville mainland.

The population dropped rapidly from around 2010 with the end of regular shipping, and expatriate Takuu chartered open boats to bring off family members, most of whom settled in Buka. In 2019 the estimated resident population was 150.
