= Polynesian outlier =

Polynesian societies outside the Polynesian Triangle

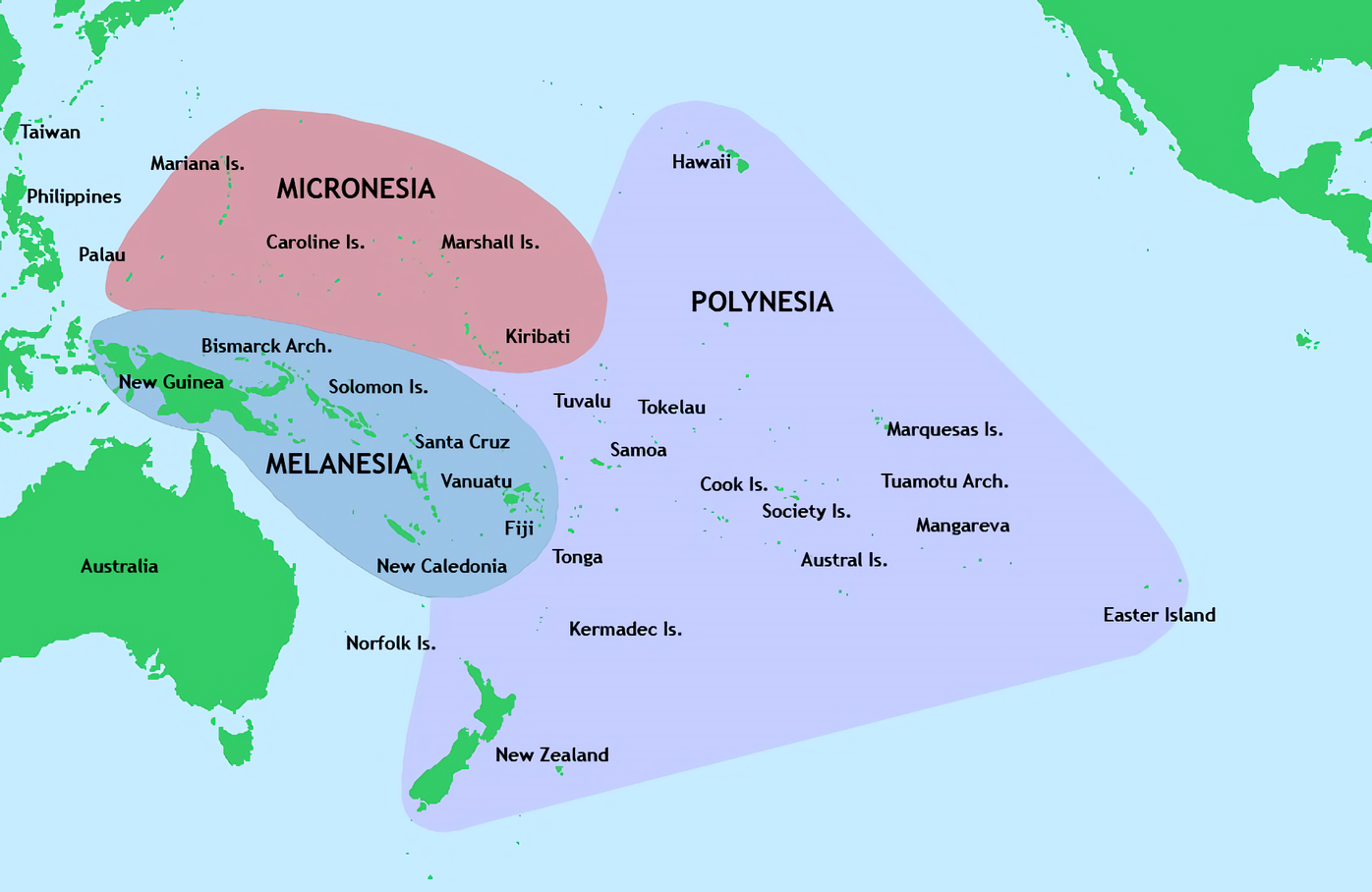
Polynesia, Melanesia, and Micronesia in the Pacific Ocean

Polynesian outliers are a number of culturally Polynesian societies that geographically lie outside the main region of Polynesian influence, known as the Polynesian Triangle. Instead, Polynesian outliers are scattered in the two other Pacific subregions, Melanesia and Micronesia. Based on archaeological and linguistic analysis, these islands are considered to have been colonized by seafaring Polynesians, mostly from the area of Samoa, Tonga, and Tuvalu.

The closest Polynesian outliers, Anuta and Tikopia in Solomon Islands, were settled some time between the 10th and 13th centuries and subsequently received multiple waves of Polynesian immigration, while the furthest outlier, Nukuoro in the Federated States of Micronesia, was only settled in the 18th century.

== General definition ==
The region commonly termed "Polynesia" includes thousands of islands, most of them arranged in a rough triangle bounded by Hawaii, Easter Island, and New Zealand. Outside this Polynesian Triangle, in areas commonly designated Micronesia and Melanesia, lie about two dozen islands, most of them small and remote, whose inhabitants speak Polynesian languages. These islands are collectively termed the Polynesian "outliers".

Their residents generally share racial features found within Polynesia proper. Physically, Polynesians tend to have brown complexions and dark, wavy hair, and they are typically large people of muscular build.

The fact that people in all of the Polynesian outliers speak recognizably Polynesian languages suggests their ancestors migrated from the Polynesian heartland fairly recently, i.e., recently enough that the degree of evolutionary divergence between the outliers' language remains comparatively small, yet there is much social variation. In some places, outlier populations settled in close proximity to Melanesian or Micronesian populations and seem to have been influenced by them. In other locations, outlier populations remained isolated by geography, ecology, or choice and seem more classically Polynesian.

== Geography ==
Map of Polynesian outliers (in red) and the original Polynesian homeland (red zone)

Polynesian outlier cultures are scattered across five countries of the Pacific: in the Federated States of Micronesia, in Papua New Guinea, in Solomon Islands, in Vanuatu, and in New Caledonia.

The Federated States of Micronesia has two outlier cultures, Kapingamarangi and Nukuoro. Papua New Guinea has three: Nuguria, Nukumanu, and Takuu. The country with the most outlier cultures is the Solomon Islands, with seven (listed from north to south): Ontong Java (Luangiua), Sikaiana (the Stewart Islands), Vaeakau-Taumako (the Duff Islands and Reef Islands), Rennell and Bellona in the southwest, and Anuta and Tikopia in the southeast. Vanuatu has three: Emae, Mele (now known as Ifira-Mele) and Futuna-Aniwa (on Futuna Island and Aniwa Island). Futuna recognizes links with Tonga. New Caledonia has one Polynesian outlier culture on Ouvéa in the Loyalty Islands, where the Fagauvea language is spoken.

== Language ==
The outlier groups in Micronesia, Papua New Guinea, and the northern Solomon Islands speak Ellicean languages (which also includes Tuvaluan), while those further to the south in the Solomons, Vanuatu, and New Caledonia speak Futunic languages (which also includes the language of Wallis and Futuna). These are two of the branches of the Samoic language family, which is sometimes called the Samoan-Outlier language family for this reason. It is a sub-branch of the Nuclear Polynesian languages. In some of these islands, the outlier population may also speak the local Melanesian or Micronesian language.

== Genetics ==
A 1983 study analyzing the DNA of 2,400 people in the Solomon Islands and Vanuatu have found markers which clearly distinguish the Polynesian outlier islands of the group. Of the four Polynesian outliers considered, Anuta was the most genetically distinct, followed by Rennell and Bellona. Tikopia showed more influence from the nearby Melanesian population. All indicate traces of inter-island population movements, and even sources from Europeans, Africans, and Asians, though the latter were at a low level.

== See also ==
● Micronesian outliers

● Polynesia
