= Pukapukan language =

Polynesian language of Pukapuka atoll, Cook Islands

Pukapukan
- Te Leo Wale
- Region: Pukapuka and Nassau islands, northern Cook Islands; some in Rarotonga; also New Zealand and Australia
- Native speakers: 450 in Cook Islands (2011 census); 2,000 elsewhere (no date)
- Language family: Austronesian: Malayo-Polynesian; Oceanic; Polynesian; Nuclear Polynesian; Pukapukan

Language codes
- ISO 639-3: pkp
- Glottolog: puka1242
- ELP: Pukapuka
- Pukapukan is classified as Definitely Endangered by the UNESCO Atlas of the World's Languages in Danger

Pukapukan is a Polynesian language that developed in isolation on the island of Pukapuka in the northern group of the Cook Islands. As a "Samoic Outlier" language with strong links to western Polynesia, Pukapukan is not closely related to any other languages of the Cook Islands, but does manifest substantial borrowing from some East Polynesian source in antiquity.

Recent research suggests that the languages of Pukapuka, Tokelau and Tuvalu group together as a cluster, and as such had significant influence on several of the Polynesian Outliers, such as Tikopia and Anuta, Pileni, Sikaiana (all in the Solomon Islands) and the Takuu Atoll in Papua New Guinea. There is also evidence that Pukapuka had prehistoric contact with Micronesia, as there are quite a number of words in Pukapukan that appear to be borrowings from Kiribati (K. & M. Salisbury conference paper, 2013).

Pukapukan is also known as "te leo Wale" ('the language of Home') in reference to the name of the northern islet where the people live. The atoll population has declined from some 750 in the early 1990s to less than 500 since the cyclone in 2005. Literacy in the Pukapukan language was introduced in the school in the 1980s, resulting in an improvement in the quality of education on the atoll.

The majority of those speaking the language live in a number of migrant communities in New Zealand and Australia. A bilingual dictionary was started by the school teachers on the island and completed in Auckland within the Pukapukan community there. An in-depth study of the language has resulted in a reference grammar. The most significant publication in the Pukapuka language is Te Puka Yā : Te Wakapononga Wōu ma te Puka Talamo : The New Testament and Psalms in Pukapukan and English (diglot edition, Pukapukan and English) published in 2024.

== History ==
Pukapukan is the language spoken on the coral atoll of Pukapuka, located in the northern section of the Cook Islands Pukapukan shares minor intelligibility with its national language of Cook Islands Maori, and bears strong links to its neighboring Western Polynesian cultures specifically Samoa. The island of Pukapuka is one of the most remote islands in the Cook Islands. There is evidence that humans have inhabited the atoll for about 2000 years, but it is not clear whether it has been continuously inhabited. Various settlements may have occurred, first from Western Polynesia. Local oral tradition records that huge waves generated by a severe cyclone washed over the island and killed most of the inhabitants except for 15–17 men, 2 women and an unknown number of children. Recent interpretation of genealogies suggests that this catastrophe occurred about 1700 AD. It was from these survivors that the island was repopulated.

The island was one of the first of the Cook Islands to be discovered by the Europeans, on Sunday 20 August 1595 by the Spanish explorer Álvaro de Mendaña.

=== Population ===
The Pukapukan language is indigenous to the island of Pukapuka and its satellite, Nassau. It is also spoken by small communities elsewhere in the Cook Islands, as well as in the larger diaspora communities in New Zealand and Australia. Today the population of Pukapuka has diminished with only a few hundred native speakers. From a 2001 census there were only about 644 speakers on Pukapuka and its plantation island of Nassau. As of a 2011 census, there are now only 450 speakers due to a devastating cyclone that hit the island of Pukapuka in 2005. There are a total of 2,400 speakers worldwide, including those who live on Pukapuka and the 200 speakers on Rarotonga, the most populous island of the Cook Islands.

=== Classification ===
Pukapukan is an Austronesian language of the Nuclear Polynesian branch. Though grouped with the Cook Islands the language shows influence from both Eastern and Western Polynesia.

== Phonology ==
=== Alphabet ===
There are 15 letters in the Pukapukan alphabet – five vowels and 10 consonants. The digraph ⟨ng⟩ occurs in the place that ⟨G⟩ occupies in the English alphabet. ⟨a, e, ng, i, k, l, m, n, o, p, t, u, v, w, y⟩

=== Consonants ===
Consonants
	Labial	Alveolar	Velar
Nasal	m	n	ŋ ⟨ng⟩
Plosive	p	t	k
Fricative	v	θʲ ⟨y⟩	
Approximant	w	l	

The consonant phonemes in Pukapukan are / p, t, k, v, w, θ, m, n, ŋ, l /.

The letters ⟨y⟩ and ⟨w⟩ are not in the Cook Islands Maori language but are additions to Pukapukan. The semivowel /w/ and the palatalised dental spirant /θʲ/, in general, regularly reflect *f and *s, respectively. The ⟨y⟩ sound in Pukapukan actually acts somewhat differently and is difficult for non native speakers to pronounce. It is pronounced like ⟨th⟩ in English "this, other".

- wano, go
- wōu, new
- wawine, woman
- yinga, fall over
- iyu, nose
- tayi, one

=== Vowels ===
Vowels
	Front		Central		Back	
	short	long	short	long	short	long
High	i	iː ⟨ī⟩			u	uː ⟨ū⟩
Mid	e	eː ⟨ē⟩			o	oː ⟨ō⟩
Low			a	aː ⟨ā⟩		

The vowels in Pukapukan are respectively /a/, /e/, /i/, /o/, and /u/. All vowels have two sounds, a long sound and a short sound. A vowel's length is indicated by writing a macron above each vowel.

- papa, rock
- papā, European
- pāpā, father
- pāpa, crewcut (hairstyle)

In Pukapukan, every syllable ends with a vowel, every vowel is pronounced, and there are no diphthongal sounds.

== Grammar ==
=== Basic word order ===
Pukapukan uses the two distinctive word orders of verb–subject–object and verb-object-subject, although it is clear that VSO is used more commonly. Adjectives always follow their nouns in Pukapukan. Waka- is often used as a causative prefix in Austronesian languages, but in Pukapukan it has various functionalities. Due to Rarotongan influence, waka- is shortened to aka-, whereas waka- is seen to be more formal. Nouns prefixed by waka- become verbs with similar meanings:

- au 'peace' → waka-au 'to make peace'
- lā 'sun' → waka-lā 'to put in the sun to dry'
- ela 'wedge' → wakaela 'to wedge'

Adjectives prefixed by waka- become transitive verbs:

- yako 'straight' → waka-yako 'to straighten'
- kokoi 'sharp' → waka-kokoi 'to sharpen'

Some verbs prefixed by waka- have specialized meanings that become somewhat difficult to predict from the base meaning.

- yā 'sacred' → waka-yā 'to observe as sacred'
- pono 'to be sure' → waka-pono 'to decide to finalize'

=== Reduplication ===
Like many other Polynesian languages, Pukapukan uses a lot of full and partial reduplication, some times to emphasize a word or to give it new meaning.

- kale, wave/surf; kale-le, undertow of the sea (waves coming in and others receding)
- kapa, to clap hands in rhythm; kapa-kapa, to flutter

=== Numerals ===
1. tayi “one”
2. lua “two”
3. tolu “three”
4. wā “four”
5. lima “five”
6. ono “six”
7. witu “seven”
8. valu “eight”
9. iva “nine”
10. laungaulu “ten”

Pukapukan uses two different counting systems in the language; the 'one unit' and the 'two unit'. Numeral classifiers are also used as prefixes for numbers over ten and different objects. The 'one unit' uses its word for ten 'laungaulu' and adds the 'one unit' number.

- 18 – laungaulu ma valu (ten and eight)

For numbers above nineteen the single unit numbers are used.

- 30 – lautolu (two three)
- 40 – lauwā (two four)

The 'two unit' is derived from the 'one unit'.

=== Demonstratives and spatial deictics ===
==== Different form classes ====
===== Demonstrative pronouns =====
Much like other Oceanic languages, Pukapukan has a three-way distinction of positional demonstrative particles that relate to the position of the speaker and addressee. In Pukapukan, these include nei 'near to the speaker,' nā 'near to addressee and lā 'away from both the speaker and addressee.' Pukapukan also has the demonstrative particle ia meaning 'aforementioned.' These demonstrative particles form compounds with the singular articles te and e and with the preposition ki 'to.'

The definite demonstrative pronouns are formed by adding the singular specific article te-. For example, when adding te-, nei becomes tēnei 'this (by me),' nā becomes tēnā 'that (by you),' lā becomes tēlā 'that (over there)' and ia becomes teia 'this (being demonstrated or mentioned previously).' These demonstrative pronouns only occur as subjects of nominal predicates and as represented below can be equated with personal pronouns (example 1), pronouns (examples 2–3) or definite common noun phrases (examples 4–5).

Ko oku tenei ko Vakayala.
PRD I this PRD Vakayala
This is me, Vakayala.

Ko koe koia tēnā na langaina toku kongá?
PRD you exactly that TAM uproot-CIA my place-DA
Was that indeed you who uprooted my garden?

Ko ai tēlā e yaelé.
PRD ANAPH.PN that TAM walk-DA
Who is that walking over there?

Ko tona teina teia.
PRD his brother this
This is his brother.

Ko te lili teia o te wī lōpā.
PRD ART anger this POSS ART all youth
This was [why] all the youths were angry.

The demonstrative subject may separate the head from the possessive phase when the nominal predicate is a complex phrase whose head is modified by a postposed possessive phrase, as shown in example 6 below.

Ko te kau teia o tona vaka
TOP ART group here POSS his canoe
These are the people belonging to his canoe.

The nonspecific article e and the positional demonstrative particles can also be combined to form indefinite demonstrative pronouns. These include ēnāi 'this (by me),' ēnā 'that (by you),' ēlā 'that (over there)' and eia 'here with (being demonstrated).' These demonstrative pronouns constitute the nucleus of indefinite nominal predicates and are normally followed by their subjects as shown in examples 7–10 below.

Ēnāi toku manako, ka wō tāua ki te keonga, tunu i a tāua manu nei.
This my thought TAM go.PL we.DU G ART point cook ACC POSS we.DU bird here
This is my idea, let's go to the point and cook our birds.

Ēnā ake te puká.
that DIR ART book-Da
Please pass that book there.

Ēlā te weke koa lele ki loto o te pū.
that ART octopus TAM run G inside POSS ART hole
Over there's an octopus fleeing to his hole.

Eia tau kapu kaope.
here.with your cup coffee
Here is your cup of coffee [handing it over]

The demonstrative particles can also form compounds with the preposition ki- 'to.' These compounds can be used as a substitute (pro-form) for locational nouns. These types of demonstrative pronouns in Pukapukan include, kinea 'to here,' kinā 'to there, by you,' kilā 'to over there' and kiai 'to there,' in which kiai is an anaphoric form.

These demonstrative pronouns occur as the head of a locative predicate as demonstrated in examples 11–13 below.

The compound kiai is formed by joining the case marker ki (meaning 'to') to the anaphoric pronoun ai. Kiai may replace a personal pronoun or a proper locational noun. This can be seen in example 13 in which the locational noun wale 'home' is replaced with kiai in the following constituent.

Nā i kinei oki te tele i te taime ia.
TAM LOC here also ART tour.group LOC ART time AF
The tour group was here at that time.

Ko i kinā mō ia Kalaka ma Pilipa.
TAM LOC there Q ART Kalaka and Pilipa
Kalaka and Pilipa are where you are, aren't they?

Angatu atu au ki wale, ko i kiai ia Pāpā mā.
go DIR I G home TAM LOC there ART Father etc.
When I got home, Father and the others were there.

These forms can also be used to substitute a noun phrase which has been marked for case by a preposition. For example:

Ka lōmamai ai ia Ngake ki kinei angaanga.
TAM come.PL ANAPH.PN ART Ngake G here REDUP-work
The whole of Ngake will come here to work.

Ko te tokatolu lā kilā
PRD ART PRE-three over there
The three of them over there.

===== Demonstrative modifiers =====
Pukapukan has several classes of modifiers. In particular, the directional and positional modifiers help indicate spatial and temporal directions and positions from the speaker and/or addressee.

Directionals
mai	'towards speaker'
atu	'away from speaker'
ake	'upwards,' 'oblique to speaker'; 'please'
io	'?downwards,' 'misfortune'

According to Clark (1976), cognates of the directional particles of Pukapukan are found in all Polynesian languages.

The directional particles tend to modify verbs more frequently than nouns and are often associated with verbs that denote movement, as well as verbs that denote speech, perception, cognition and social interaction.

Mai indicates real or implied movement in the direction of the speaker, for example:

Teketeke mai kai aku nei.
REDUP-move DIR G-ART I here
Move a little closer to me.

Auwē koe e tāpitāpi mai, ka yuyū toku kākawu.
NEG.IMP you TAM sprinkle DIR TAM wet my clothes.
Don't splash water on me in case my clothes get wet.

Atu can indicate physical movement away from the speaker, as in:

Yoloyolo atu koe ki te toe kaokao.
REDUP-move DIR you G ART other side
Move away from me to the other side.

and for verbs of perception and communication can also indicate direction away from the deictic centre, for example:

Ko tātā atu iāna kia koe?
TAM write DIR he G-ART you
Does he write to you?

Atu can also encode temporal progression away from the present.

Wea atu ai koe?
what DIR ANAPH.PN you
What did you do then?

Mai and atu can co-occur when modifying the same verb, when one has a directional meaning and the other has a temporal or aspectual meaning.

Ake mostly functions as a politeness marker, but the directional particle ake now has meanings 'upwards' and 'oblique to speaker,' which appears to be a one-particle combination of Proto-Polynesian's hake 'upwards' and aŋe 'oblique to speaker.' Hence, it can function similar to atu and mai in term of denoting temporal and aspectual meanings. However, these forms are rarely used in present day.

In saying that, io is found to be used even less. Reflexes of its Proto-Polynesian form have traditionally been glossed 'downwards,' but this meaning is hardly apparent in Pukapukan and is more often associated with meaning 'misfortune coming upon one.'

Positionals
nei	'near to speaker'
nā	'near to addressee'
lā	'away from both, 'intensifier'
-V	definitive accent: 'away from both'
ia	'aforementioned'

The positional modifiers indicate location in space or time relative to the speaker or to the deictic centre of the discourse.

Nei 'near to speaker' can modify a noun in a noun phrase or a locative phrase. Doing so indicates that the entity encoded by the noun is within sight of or in the general locality of the speaker. For instance, in example 21 below, the speaker is likely pointing to a 'word' near them while asking the question.

E wea te ingoa nei?
PRD what ART name here
What is this word?

Nā 'near to addressee' only occurs in noun phrases and can denote a position near to the addressee (example 22), something belonging to the addressee or a characteristic behavior pattern or inherent quality of the addressee (example 23) or, in long-distance communication nā can indicate that the addressee is anticipated to be in a certain place at the time of reading the letter or story or answering the phone call during the long-distance communication (example 24).

Aumai ake taku pāla nā.
bring DIR my knife there
Please pass my knife [that you have].

Kokoto ake tā kōtou īmene nā ke langona.
R-grunt DIR POSS you song there C hear
Please start your song so [we] can hear [it].

Auwā ko lelei wua kōtou i Wale nā.
probably TAM good just you LOC home there.
I hope you are all well there in Pukapuka [where you are].

Lā 'away from both speaker and addressee; intensifier' may only occur with a directional meaning in verb phrases, not in noun phrases. Lā often modifies motion verbs and can take on the directional meaning of 'there, yonder.' For example:

Luku lā koe ki te watu.
dive there you G ART stone
Dive down to the rock.

===== Demonstrative predicates =====
In Pukapukan, demonstrative predicates take on a number of roles and functions.

Firstly, indefinite demonstrative pronouns can function as predicates which denote spatial or temporal location and are usually followed by their subjects as demonstrated in examples 7–10 above.

When denoting temporal location, demonstrative predicates may do this specifically (as in example 26) or indirectly (as in example 27).

Ēnei loa te taime ko velavela.
here INT ART time TAM RR-hot
This is really the time when [the food] is hot.

Kalia wua, ēnei na pau.
wait-CIA just here TAM finish
Just wait, [I'm nearly] finished.

In narratives, demonstrative predicates may be used to set the scene for an imminent event, such as:

Ēnei iki nā vaka
here carry ART canoe
Here [they were] carrying the canoes.

They may also function as an affirmation seeker or used to describe or explain an aside in real time to listeners and readers.

Ēnei, na tiketike ai te langi ki lunga nei.
here TAM RR-high PRO ART sky G up here
Thus, the sky is high up above.

Ēlā, ko te tangata na uwiuwia na pulú, ko Tepou.
there TOP ART person TAM RR-cover-CIA ART husk-DA, PRD Tepou
You know, that person who was turning over those husks, it was Tepou.

In particular, eia can be used to set apart narrative clauses from backgrounding comments and is also used as a marker which concludes a narrative.

Eia, Kave loe lā oki lātou ia Uyo ma tana lau.
so take INT INT also they ART Uyo and his men
So, then they took Uyo and his men.

Eia, pau atu ai taku tala ia.
so finish DIR PRO my story AF
So, that's the end of my story.

Lastly, demonstrative predicates do not allow topicalisation of their subjects.

*Te, puka ēnei.
ART book here
(Here is the book).

===== Demonstrative adverbs =====
Pukapukan has four demonstrative adverbs. These include pēnei 'like this,' pēnā 'like that [by you],' pēlā 'like that [over there]' and peia 'like so [being demonstrated]' can modify a predicate, function as verbs, denote modality, introduce direct or indirect speech or stand as a pro-form for a prepositional phrase. For example, peia functions as a verb meaning 'carry on in like manner' to the action or state described in a previous clause as seen in example 34 below.

[Nō kiai kake loa iāna i te niu mua], [kake i te lua], [pēia wua ai], [oko ki te niu openga].
POSS that climb INT he ACC ART coconut first climb ACC ART second like-so just PRO arrive G ART coconut last
So he climbed the first coconut, climbed the second, and carried on like that [until he] got to the last coconut.

==== Deictic distinctions ====
This demonstrative paradigm below shows the four deictic patterns found in Pukapukan.

Pukapukan demonstrative paradigm
	Postposed positionals	Subject pronouns	Nominal predicate heads	Similative pro-verbs	Locative pronouns
Pattern 1	nei	tēnei	ēnei	pēnei	kinei
Pattern 2	nā	tēnā	ēnā	pēnā	kinā
Pattern 3	-V	tēlā	ēlā	pēlā	kilā
Pattern 4	ia	teia	eia	peia	kiai

Pattern 1 generally corresponds to 'near speaker, or deictic centre.' For example:

Ko i loto o te pia nei.
TAM LOC inside POSS ART box here.
[It] is inside the box [that I am holding].

Pattern 2 generally corresponds to 'near the addressee.'

Ko i loto o te pia nā
TAM LOC inside POSS ART box there.
[It] is inside the box [that you are holding].

Pattern 3 generally corresponds to 'away from both speaker and addressee.'

Ko i loto o te piá.
TAM LOC inside POSS ART box-DA
[It] is inside the box over there.

Pattern 4 generally corresponds to 'aforementioned or being demonstrated.'

Ko i loto o te pia ia.
TAM LOC inside POSS ART box AF
[It] is inside the box [that we mentioned, or that I am giving to you].

== Vocabulary ==
=== Indigenous vocabulary ===
- kāvatavata “noise made by snapping tongue”
- Pōiva “name of a deified ancestor”
- pulu “the calf of the leg”
- Yāmatangi “prayer for a fair wind”

=== Loanwords ===
Pukapukan is not closely related to other Cook Islands languages but it does show substantial borrowing from Eastern Polynesian languages, such as Rarotongan. In fact, because there is no 'r' in Pukapukan 'l' takes its place in Rarotongan borrowings.

	Pukapukan	Rarotongan
Rarotonga	Lalotonga	Rarotonga
torch	lama	rama
hurry	limalima	rimarima
angry	lili	riri
pour	lilingi	riringi

=== Homophones ===
Pukapukan uses many homophones in its vocabulary usually to give names to new words or items with similar origin meanings.

kapa

1. v. to clap hands in rhythm
2. v. to cry loudly
3. n. corner

ata

1. n. an emotional shock
2. n. shadow
3. n. Dawn
4. v. to change color
5. Verbal prefix: good at, skilled in

lulu

1. v. to tie up
2. n. Bundle, village, group, team
3. n. Name of a taro preparation
4. n. Name of a bird

== Endangerment ==
=== Materials ===
There is a limited list when it comes to the language of Pukapukan. Although, today speakers of the language, locals of Pukapuka, and especially teachers on the island are working to put together books and resources dedicated to the teaching and structure of Pukapukan. Collaboratively the locals of the island are also working to bring back to their own community since the devastating Cyclone Percy in 2005. Since 2005 it has taken nearly 6 years to rebuild their communities. Currently there are a select number of manuscripts and dictionaries on the language of Pukapukan, but their culture is kept alive through music and dance collaborations across the pacific and websites like YouTube.

=== Vitality ===
According to Ethnologue Pukapukan is considered to be a threatened language and its “Intergenerational transmission is in the process of being broken, but the child-bearing generation can still use the language so it is possible that revitalization efforts could restore transmission of the language in the home. Speakers of Pukapukan especially children are multilingual in English and Cook Islands Maori, but English is rarely spoken outside of schools and many classes are actually taught in Pukapukan. Today, revitalization efforts of Pukapuka and its language are underway.

Per the Te Reo Maori Act, Pukapukan is deemed to be a form of Cook Islands Māori for legal purposes.
