= Ontong Java language =

Polynesian language spoken in Solomon Islands

Ontong Java
- Luangiua
- Native to: Solomon Islands
- Region: Ontong Java Atoll
- Native speakers: (2,400 cited 1999)
- Language family: Austronesian: Malayo-Polynesian; Oceanic; Polynesian; Ellicean; Ontong Java

Language codes
- ISO 639-3: ojv
- Glottolog: onto1237

Ontong Java is a Polynesian language spoken on the Ontong Java Atoll in Solomon Islands. Its dialects—Luangiua and Pelau—are named after the two principal inhabited islands; the name Luangiua is also commonly used to refer to the Ontong Java language as a whole.

Ontong Java is commonly used by all speakers, young and old. There are approximately 2,370 residents of Ontong Java Atoll and has an estimated 2,400 speakers living on the atoll.

== Classification ==
Ontong Java is closely related to the Ellicean languages of Polynesia and to Sikaiana, Takuu, and Nukumanu in Papua New Guinea.

== Phonology ==
The phoneme inventory of this language is poorly studied, and many sources have conflicting phoneme inventories.

Consonants
	Labial	Alveolar	Velar	Glottal
Nasal	m		ŋ	
Plosive	p		k	ʔ
Fricative	v	s		h
Lateral		l (Note: This source says there is one liquid consonant (r / l), but does not specify which one.)		

Vowels
	Front	Central	Back
High	i		u
Mid	e		o
Low		a	

An older source lists two additional vowels, /ɑ/ and /ə/.

== Grammar ==
Ontong Java word order is normally VSO and SVO.
