= Nukuria language =

Polynesian language spoken on Nuguria, Papua New Guinea

Nuguria
- Nukuria
- Native to: Papua New Guinea
- Region: Nuguria
- Native speakers: 550 (2003)
- Language family: Austronesian: Malayo-Polynesian; Oceanic; Polynesian; Ellicean; Nuguria

Language codes
- ISO 639-3: nur
- Glottolog: nuku1259

Nukuria is a Polynesian language spoken by about 550 people on Nuguria, Papua New Guinea.

== Classification ==
Nukuria is part of the Ellicean–Outlier subbranch of the Polynesian languages, and is closely related to other nearby languages such as Nukumanu, Takuu, Nukuoro, and Luangiua.

== Status ==
The language was taught in primary schools on Nuguria and was used for daily communications between adults and children.

Research on the language (as well as the location it is spoken) is scarce. Past research stated Nuguria was at risk of endangerment; at that point it was still being passed to children. However, recent research indicates that Nukuria is now most likely an extinct language.

== Phonology ==
The Nukuria language's alphabet contains five vowels: /a/, /e/, /i/, /o/, /u/, and fifteen consonants: /p/, /b/, /m/, /f/, /v/, /t/, /s/, /n/, /l/, /r/, /k/, /g/, /ŋ/, /w/, /h/.

Nukuria consonants
		Labial	Alveolar	Velar	Glottal
Nasal		m	n	ŋ	
Stop	voiceless	p	t	k	
Stop	voiced	b		g	
Fricative	voiceless	f	s		h
Fricative	voiced	v			
Approximant			l	w	
Trill			r		

Vowels
	Front	Central	Back
High	i		u
Mid	e		o
Low		a	

== Grammar ==
There is a distinct scarceness of research on the grammar and alphabet of the Nukuria language, but, as with many Austronesian languages, Nukuria has a subject-verb-object sentence structure.
