= Takuu language =

Polynesian language spoken on Bougainville Island

Takuu
- Native to: Papua New Guinea
- Region: Takuu (Mortlock atoll)
- Native speakers: 1,800 (2003)
- Language family: Austronesian: Malayo-Polynesian; Oceanic; Polynesian; Ellicean; Takuu

Language codes
- ISO 639-3: nho
- Glottolog: taku1257

Takuu, also known as Mortlock, is an Ellicean language spoken on Takuu Atoll near Bougainville Island. It is closely related to Nukumanu and Nukuria, spoken from Papua New Guinea to Ontong Java and Sikaiana on the Solomon Islands.

== Population ==
The Takuu language is spoken in Mortlock village on Takuu Atoll (Marqueen Islands), located off the east coast of Bougainville in Papua New Guinea, approximately 250 km (160 mi) northeast of Kieta. The atoll consists of about 13 islands, but the majority of the population resides on a small island named Nukutoa. The islands are inhabited by approximately 400 people of Polynesian origin, referred to as "the people of Takuu" or simply Takuu. According to Ethnologue, there are about 1,750 speakers of the Takuu language.

== Phonology ==
=== Consonants ===
Takuu has eleven consonant phonemes, a typical inventory for a Polynesian language.

| | Labial | Alveolar | Velar | Glottal |
|---|---|---|---|---|
| Nasal | m | n | | |
| Plosive | p | t | k | |
| Fricative | f v | s | | h |
| Liquid | | l r | | |

- A phonemic length distinction exists between single and geminate (double) consonants. Geminates are typically articulated with a prolonged closure or hold phase (described by Moyle 2011 as a "delayed release"); for stops, this means the initial closure has no audible release until the articulation is completed (i.e., geminate /p/ is realised phonetically as [p̚p] or [pː]).
  - While most speakers execute this delayed release cleanly, a very small number occasionally insert a brief epenthetic vowel between the geminates (e.g., pronouncing ssamu as sasamu). Expanded forms of geminates also frequently occur in song poetry.
- The voiceless labiodental fricative /f/ and lateral /l/ are currently shifting to the glottal fricative /h/ and alveolar approximant /r/ respectively, with the first change being a form of debuccalisation. For many speakers, /f/ and /h/, as well as /l/ and /r/, exist in free variation. Some elderly speakers insist that /f/ and /l/ represent the "correct" pronunciation, while others utilise these older forms specifically for emphasis or focus.
  - However, these shifts only affect single consonants; geminates (/ff/ and /ll/; described as "clusters" by Moyle 2011) are always retained (e.g., hatiffati).
  - Since the 1990s, younger speakers have also systematically debuccalised the alveolar fricative /s/ to /h/. This is likely due to imitation of the neighbouring Nukumanu language and serves as a marker of generational distinctiveness. Young women also occasionally trill their liquid approximants.

=== Vowels ===
Takuu has a typical Polynesian five-vowel system, with a phonemic length distinction between short and long vowels.

| | Front | Central | Back |
|---|---|---|---|
| High | i iː | | u uː |
| Mid | e eː | | o oː |
| Low | | a aː | |

- The high vowels /u/ and /i/ are realised as the glides [w] and [j] respectively, particularly when they precede the low back vowel /a/, or when /u/ precedes /i/.

=== Stress and prosody ===
Takuu word structure is organised around the mora, a unit of prosodic timing in which short vowels are monomoraic and long vowels bimoraic. Word-level stress is sensitive to this distinction: primary stress typically falls on the penultimate mora-bearing vowel, while secondary stress falls on one or more preceding vowels. The presence of long vowels thus directly shifts stress placement across a word. In broader discourse, utterance-level stress supersedes word stress, creating a rhythmic succession of alternating stressed and unstressed vowels.

Words consisting of only one or two syllables are rarely cited in isolation; a minimal verbal utterance must contain at least four morae. To achieve this when citing short verbs in isolation, the preceding tense marker is lengthened and spoken with a rising inflection (e.g., ee tere, "to run"). Similarly, short nouns cited in isolation obligatorily take a definite article to satisfy these prosodic requirements.

Intonation contours also serve syntactic functions, particularly in question formation. A declarative statement can be converted into a polar question purely through a change in pitch, by applying a rising intonation to the penultimate syllable and a falling intonation to the ultimate syllable. If the utterance ends in a long vowel, the entire falling contour tone is realised within that final bimoraic syllable.

== Grammar ==
=== Basic word order ===
The basic word order in the Takuu language is subject–verb–object (SVO). In transitive sentences lacking the passive/ergative -Cia suffix, the actor precedes the verb and the patient follows it.

Te taupu raa e ahii naa ika raa ki naa lau huti.
ART girl DEM COMPL wrap ART fish DEM INST ART leaf banana.
"The girl wrapped the fish up in banana leaves."

Nau e akonaki taku tama raa ki see kailaarao.
1SG COMPL teach 1SG.POSS child DEM PURP NEG steal.
"I teach my child not to steal."

=== Articles ===
Takuu distinguishes between definite and indefinite articles, both of which are marked for number. The definite articles are te (singular) and naa (plural). The indefinite articles are se (singular) and ni (plural).

In connected speech, the singular definite article te frequently undergoes vowel elision when preceding a noun that begins with the alveolar stop /t/. The loss of the vowel triggers gemination of the noun's initial consonant:

te tama → ttama
ART(SG) person {} {the person}

te tai → ttai
ART(SG) sea {} {the sea}

=== Pronouns ===
==== Personal pronouns ====
Personal pronouns distinguish three numbers (singular, dual and plural) and encode a clusivity distinction (inclusive vs. exclusive) in the first-person dual and plural forms.

Takuu independent personal pronouns
| Person | Singular | Dual | Plural |
|---|---|---|---|
| 1st exclusive | nau | maaua | maatou |
| 1st inclusive | — | taaua | taatou |
| 2nd | koe | koorua | kootou |
| 3rd | ia | laaua | laatou |

==== Possessive pronouns ====
Possession in Takuu is marked by either preposed or postposed possessive pronouns. Postposed possessives function emphatically. Takuu exhibits a possessum-based split where the pronoun must agree in number with the possessed noun.

Preposed possessives
| Person | Singular possessum | Plural possessum |
|---|---|---|
| 1st | taku | aku |
| 2nd | too | oo |
| 3rd | tana | ana |

This morphological number distinction is frequently used to differentiate between specific anatomical organs and general body regions:

taku manava
1SG.POSS(SG) stomach
"my stomach (the organ)"

aku manava
1SG.POSS(PL) stomach
"my whole stomach region (internal and external)"

=== Numerals ===
Takuu uses a base-10 numeral system, with an explicit counting range extending from 1 to 1,000. Cardinal numerals function either as common nouns or as stative verbs, allowing them to be preceded by a tense marker. The particle maa is used as a conjoining marker for compound numbers, while non-compound numbers and ordinal numbers do not use this conjunction.

In formal counting, ordinal numbers are treated as common nouns, except for "first", which is indicated by the verb mua.

Distributive numbers are formed by attaching the prefix tiki- to the numeral (e.g., tikitasi for "one each"). When counting people distributively, the prefix taka- is added for quantities up to ten, and tino- is used for subsequent units of ten.

The language employs distinct sets of counting paradigms depending on the noun class being quantified, with specific paradigms for counting currency, items and units of length, as illustrated below:

| Number | Cardinals | Units of money (10 toea) | Net mesh | Coconuts, stones (units of two) |
|---|---|---|---|---|
| 1 | tasi | tokotasi | tamataa tasi | siaoa |
| 2 | rua | rua | tamataa rua | ruaoa |
| 3 | toru | toru | tamataa toru | torunaaoa |
| 4 | ha | ha | tamataa haa | haanaoa |
| 5 | rima | rima | tamataa rima | sehui |
| 6 | ono | ono | tamataa ono | sehuirua |
| 7 | hitu | hitu | tamataa hitu | sehuitoru |
| 8 | varu | varu | tamataa varu | sehuiehaa |
| 9 | sivo | sivo | tamataa sivo | sehuierima |
| 10 | sinahuru | sehui (Note: Equivalent to one Papua New Guinean kina (K1)) | tamataa se lau | sehuieono |
| 20 | matarua | sehui e rua | — | sehuiehitu |
| 30 | matatoru | sehui e toru | — | sehuievaru |
| 40 | matahaa | sehui e haa | — | sehuiesivo |
| 50 | matarima | sehui e rima | — | huitarau |
| 60 | mataono | sehui e ono | — | huitarauerima |
| 70 | matahitu | sehui e hitu | — | se hua |
| 80 | matavaru | sehui e varu | — | — |
| 90 | matasivo | sehui e sivo | — | — |
| 100 | se lau | huitarau | — | — |
| 500 | rimanaarau | huitarauerima | — | — |
| 1000 | simata | se hua | — | — |

| Number | Fish | Units of rope (fathoms) | Units of wood | Humans | Canoes |
|---|---|---|---|---|---|
| 1 | tasi | soroha | soroha | sokotasi | sokotasi |
| 2 | rua | loharua | loharua | takarua | tauvakarua |
| 3 | toru | lohatoru | lohatoru | takatoru | tauvakatoru |
| 4 | haa | lohahaa | lohahaa | takahaa | tauvakahaa |
| 5 | rima | loharima | loharima | takarima | tauvakarima |
| 6 | ono | lohaono | lohaono | takaono | tauvakaono |
| 7 | hitu | lohahitu | lohahitu | takahitu | tauvakahitu |
| 8 | varu | lohavaru | lohavaru | takavaru | tauvakavaru |
| 9 | sivo | lohasivo | lohasivo | takasivo | tauvakasivo |
| 10 | sinahuru | (se)kumi | ee kumi | takasinahuru | tauvakasinahuru |
| 20 | matarua | sekumierua | rua rau | (tinotasi) | — |
| 30 | matatoru | sekumietoru | toru naa rau | tinorua | — |
| 40 | matahaa | sekumiehaa | haa naa rau | tinotoru | — |
| 50 | matarima | sekumierima | rima naa rau | tinohaa | — |
| 60 | mataono | sekumieono | ono naa rau | tinorima | — |
| 70 | matahitu | sekumiehitu | hitu naa rau | tinoono | — |
| 80 | matavaru | sekumievaru | varu naa rau | tinohitu | — |
| 90 | matasivo | sekumiesivo | sivo naa rau | tinovaru | — |
| 100 | se lau | se lau | — | tinosivo | — |
| 200 | — | rua rau | — | tino rau | — |
| 300 | — | toru naa rau | — | — | — |
| 400 | — | haa naa rau | — | — | — |
| 500 | — | rima naa rau | — | — | — |
| 600 | — | ono naa rau | — | — | — |
| 700 | — | hitu naa rau | — | — | — |
| 800 | — | varu naa rau | — | — | — |
| 900 | — | sivo naa rau | — | — | — |
| 1000 | simata | simata | — | simata | simata |

=== Verbal morphology ===
==== The -Cia suffix ====
Takuu employs a highly productive verbal suffix, represented morphophonemically as -Cia (where C is a thematic consonant dictated by the verb root). Depending on the syntactic context, it derives transitive verbs and functions as a passive or ergative marker. When applied to an active verb, the sentence shifts to a patient-initial word order, with the agent (if expressed) introduced by the particles e or a.

The suffix surfaces in various allomorphs depending on the verb root, which are -a, -hia, -ia, -ina, -kia, -lia, -mia, -nia, -ria, -sia and -tia.

llomi → loomia
{to press down} {} {pressed down}

soro → soroia
{to perceive a draft} {} perceived

taa → taania
{to kill} {} killed

==== Causative haka- ====
The prefix haka- is a highly productive causative marker. It primarily derives transitive causative verbs from stative verbs, but can also derive verbs from nouns or create similative verbs (indicating an action done in the manner of the root).

ppii → hakappii
full {} {to fill something}

raaoi → hakaraaoi
peaceful {} {to pacify someone}

tautai → hakatautai
{fishing leader} {} {to act in the manner of a fishing leader}

Before most verb roots beginning with /k/, the prefix is shortened to hak-, and before some roots beginning with /u/, it becomes haa-:

kaa → hakkaa
sharp {} {to sharpen}

unu → haaunu
{to drink} {} {to cause to drink}

==== Reciprocal he- ====
The prefix he- is attached to verbs to indicate plurality of participants, specifically coding either reciprocal action or simultaneous joint action.

kapi → hekapi
blocked {} {to strive against one another}

mau → hemau
{to grip} {} {to tussle / to fight for the same thing}

==== Reduplication ====
Takuu makes extensive use of reduplication, primarily in verbs, to mark repeated or ongoing action.

kata → kata-kata
{to laugh} {} {laughing repeatedly}

apuru → apuru-puru
{to sink} {} {sinking repeatedly}

Most verbs agree in number with plural subjects by reduplicating the first syllable of the root. When the first syllable is reduplicated, the vowel is typically omitted, forming an initial geminate consonant; however, among older speakers, the full syllable reduplication is retained. Full syllable reduplication is also routinely retained in singing to achieve a predetermined number of syllables in a poetic line. The basic patterns for plural reduplication are as follows:

| Singular | Plural | Gloss |
|---|---|---|
| keri | kkeri | "to dig" |
| taki | ttaki | "to serve drinks" |
| vasi | vvasi | "to split in half" |

When the initial consonant is /h/, it changes to /ff/ in the plural form:

| Singular | Plural | Gloss |
|---|---|---|
| hati | ffati | "to break" |
| hatu | ffatu | "to fold" |
| hiti | ffiti | "to shift" |
| horo | fforo | "to swallow" |
| huri | ffuri | "to overturn" |

When a verb begins with a vowel, a geminate consonant is formed from the following consonant:

| Singular | Plural | Gloss |
|---|---|---|
| iloa | illoa | "to know" |
| apuru | appuru | "to sink" |

Verbs with three syllables beginning with a consonant and having /r/ as the second consonant mark the plural by changing /r/ to /ll/:

| Singular | Plural | Gloss |
|---|---|---|
| tuureki | tulleki | "to push" |
| karana | kallana | "to call out" |

In verbs with an initial /r/, that consonant changes to /l/:

| Singular | Plural | Gloss |
|---|---|---|
| rorosi | lollosi | "to protect" |
| rave | llave | "to find" |

Reduplication also occurs in sentences to serve as a marker of quantity where the verb action relates to multiple available subjects or objects:

maatau → mamattau
{to fish with a handline} {} {of many men fishing in that manner}

kape → kapekkape
{to lift up and remove with an implement} {} {to lift and remove several items with an implement}

=== Particles ===
Takuu employs two main classes of particles: pre-verbal tense–aspect markers and post-verbal directional particles.

==== Tense and aspect ====
Verbal sentences in Takuu typically begin with a pre-verbal tense–aspect marker. Takuu utilises five primary markers, some of which carry evidential distinctions based on the speaker's firsthand observation:

| Marker | Gloss | Description |
|---|---|---|
| ku | Immediate future | Indicates an action about to happen, or an action occurring immediately following another. |
| ku | Perfective | Indicates a recently completed action or change of state specifically observed by the speaker. |
| e | Completed/Habitual/Stative | Indicates no change of state, a habitual action, or an event where the speaker arrived after the outcome occurred. |
| ni | Durative/Past | Indicates an event or condition completed in the past. |
| koi | Progressive | Indicates a continuing state or an activity still in progress. |

There is a clear distinction between ku (perfective) and e as evidential markers. For example:

Te unamea nei ku mate.
ART turtle DEM PERF die
"This turtle is dead (speaker observed it die)."

Te unamea nei e mate.
ART turtle DEM COMPL die
"This turtle is dead (speaker arrived after the death occurred)."

==== Directional particles ====
As is characteristic of Oceanic languages, Takuu utilises post-verbal directional particles to specify the spatial trajectory of an action. These are frequently used for both literal geographic movement and conceptual motion.

| Particle | Direction |
|---|---|
| atu | away from the speaker |
| mai | towards the speaker |
| iho | downwards, seawards (towards the ocean) or towards the speaker from a distant location |
| ake | upwards, laterally across the speaker's line of sight or a command directed at a third party |

== Vocabulary ==
=== Indigenous vocabulary ===
As a member of the Ellicean branch, the core indigenous vocabulary of Takuu is inherited directly from the Proto-Polynesian language, while having undergone characteristic sound changes typical of the Polynesian Outlier languages.

- sennit → kaha
- severe → mahi
- shade → maru
- to sell → taavi
- water (fresh) → vai
- wavy / corrugated → manamana
- way / path → ara

=== Borrowed vocabulary ===
The language has integrated numerous borrowings, primarily from English and Tok Pisin, adapting them to Takuu phonotactics.

- boat / rowboat → poti (from English boat)
- bucket → paakete (from English bucket)
- cat → pusi (from English pussy)
- cook → kuki (from English cook)
- cotton wool → kaaten (from English cotton)
- glass / mirror → kalas (from English glass)
- kerosene → karasini (from English kerosene)
- old person → laapun (from Tok Pisin lapun)
- school → skul (from English school)
- ship → tima (from English steamer)
- store → sitoa (from English store)
- war → uoo (from English war)

=== Comparative vocabulary ===
| | Takuu | Samoan | Tokelauan | Rarotongan | Māori | Hawaiian |
|---|---|---|---|---|---|---|
| sky | /ɾani/ | /laŋi/ | /laŋi/ | /ɾaŋi/ | /ɾaŋi/ | /lani/ |
| north wind | /tokoɾau/ | /toʔelau/ | /tokelau/ | /tokeɾau/ | /tokeɾau/ | /koʔolau/ |
| woman | /ffine/ | /fafine/ | /fafine/ | /vaʔine/ | /wahine/ | /wahine/ |
| house | /faɾe/ | /fale/ | /fale/ | /ʔaɾe/ | /ɸaɾe/ | /hale/ |
| parent | /maːtua/ | /matua/ | /maːtua/ | /metua/ | /matua/ | /makua/ |
| mother | /tinna/, /tinnaː/ | /tinaː/ | /maːtua/ | /maːmaː/ | /ɸaea/ | /makuahine/ |
| father | /tama/, /tamana/ | /tamaː/ | /tama/, /tamana/ | /metua/, /paːpaː/ | /matua/, /paːpaː/ | /makua kaːne/ |
| canoe | /te vaka/ | /vaʔa/ | /te vaka/ | /vaka/, /vaka ama/ | /waka ama/ | /waʔa/ |

== Endangerment ==
While Takuu is not presently considered seriously endangered, as it remains vigorously spoken on the atoll, the language faces increasing threat from demographic decline. A growing number of inhabitants have left the island due to economic hardship and the effects of climate change, particularly rising sea levels. Many younger Takuu speakers living elsewhere no longer use the language in everyday conversation, while the population of the atoll itself continues to diminish. Takuu activist Raroteone Tefuarani reported being shocked by the rapid loss of language and cultural identity among the Takuu population resettled in Buka, Bougainville, in 2012. As of 2016, only an estimated few hundred residents remained permanently on Takuu.

== See also ==
- Takuu Atoll

== Bibliography ==
- Moyle, Richard M. (2011), Takuu Grammar and Dictionary: A Polynesian language of the South Pacific, Pacific Linguistics, Canberra, ACT: Australian National University, ISBN 978-0-85883-637-2
