= Nuguria =

Island group in Papua New Guinea

Coordinates: 3.33333°S 154.75°E

Location of Nuguria

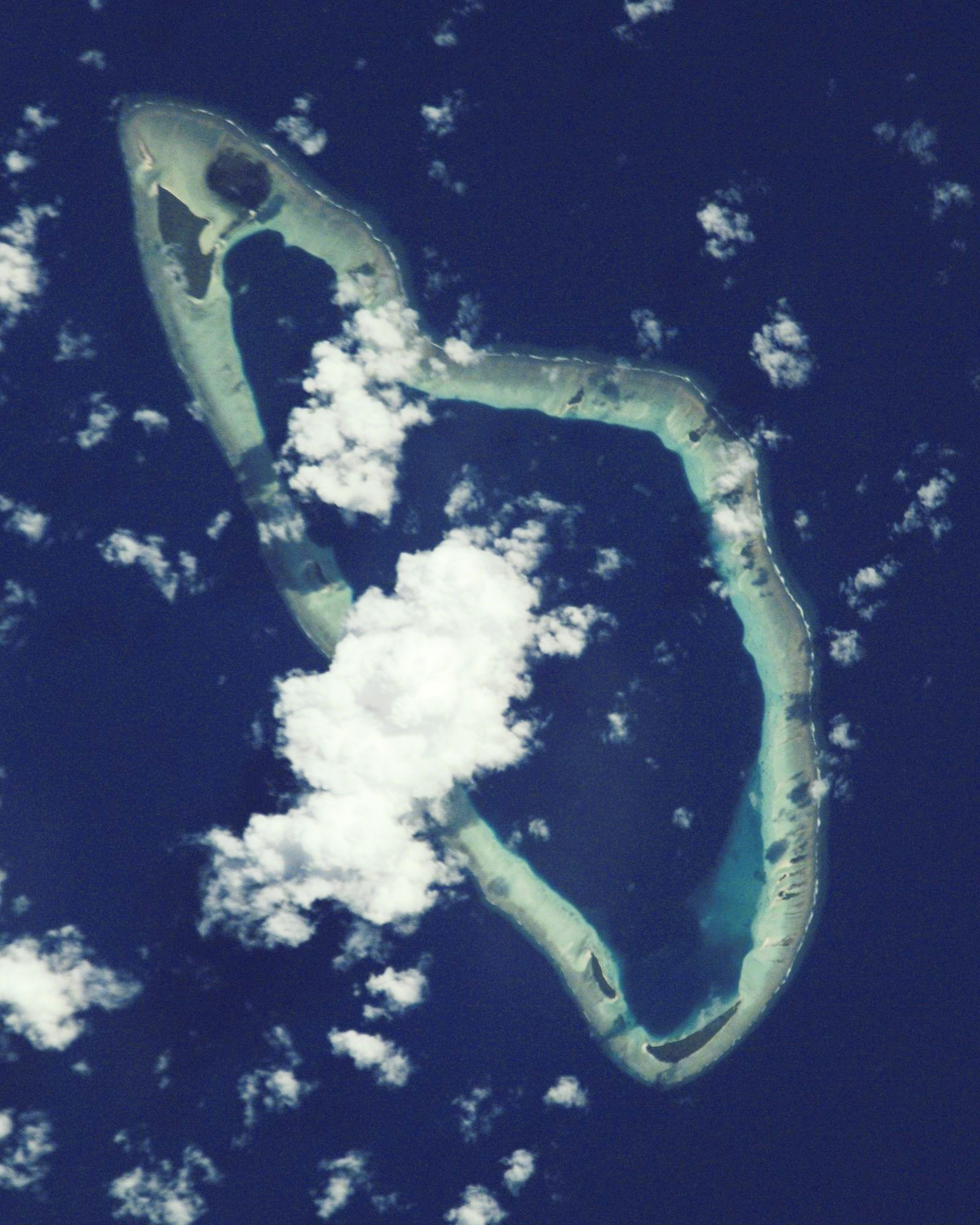
NASA picture of Malum Atoll, the northern and smaller atoll of the group

Nuguria or the Nuguria Islands, also known as the Abgarris or Fead Islands, are islands of Papua New Guinea. They are located nearly 150 km from the northern end of Buka island, in the Autonomous Region of Bougainville and consist of two closely spaced atoll formations. Though administered by Bougainville, the islands are Polynesian outliers and the population speaks Nukuria, a Polynesian language.
