= West Uvean language =

Polynesian language of Ouvéa, New Caledonia

West Uvean
- Fagauvea
- Native to: New Caledonia
- Region: Ouvéa
- Native speakers: 2,200 (2009 census)
- Language family: Austronesian: Malayo-Polynesian; Oceanic; Polynesian; Futunic?; West Uvean

Language codes
- ISO 639-3: uve
- Glottolog: west2516
- West Uvean is classified as Vulnerable by the UNESCO Atlas of the World's Languages in Danger

West Uvean (also Uvean or Faga Ouvéa; Fagauvea in the vernacular) is a Polynesian outlier language spoken on the island of Ouvéa, in the Loyalty island group of New Caledonia, and in the capital of Nouméa.

West Uvean has been studied by linguists Françoise Ozanne-Rivierre and Claire Moyse-Faurie.

== Name ==
The speakers designate their language by the name Fagauvea, which is also the name used in French. The name West Uvean sometimes used in English is meant to distinguish the language from the related East Uvean or Wallisian, spoken on Wallis Island (ʻUvea).

== Phonology ==
West Uvean has long been in contact with Iaai, the Southern Oceanic language also spoken on the same island. This contact has resulted in four vowels being added to the phonemic system of West Uvean; and to a complexification of the syllable structure, allowing for final consonants.

Consonants
		Labial	Dental	Alveolar	Retroflex	Palatal	Velar	Glottal
Nasal	voiceless	m̥		n̥				
Nasal	voiced	m		n		ɲ	ŋ	
Plosive	voiceless	p		t	ʈ	c	k	
Plosive	voiced	b		d	ɖ	ɟ	ɡ	
Fricative	voiceless	f	θ	s		ʃ		h
Fricative	voiced	v						
Rhotic				(ɾ)				
Approximant	voiceless	w̥		l̥				
Approximant	voiced	w		l				

/ɾ/ is only heard in intervocalic position.

Vowels
	Front		Central	Back
High	i	y		u
Mid	e	œ	ə	o
Low	æ		a	

== Grammar ==
=== Numeral system ===
West Uvean is the only Polynesian language to use a quinary numeral system. While Polynesian languages historically have a decimal system, West Uvean evolved to a quinary system, under influence of its Iaai neighbour.

There are two sets of numerals from 11 to 20, the second way was the archaic form. The word tupu means 'sum', teanua in tahi a teanua means 'human body', and nea in tahi enea means 'man'. Nowadays, the West Uvea or Faga Uvea people use French or Iaai numeral systems more frequently.
