= Nukuoro language =

Polynesian language spoken in Micronesia

Nukuoro
- Nukuoro
- Native to: Micronesia
- Region: Nukuoro Atoll
- Native speakers: (undated figure of 600); 140 in the U.S. (no date)
- Language family: Austronesian: Malayo-Polynesian; Oceanic; Polynesian; Ellicean; Nukuoro

Language codes
- ISO 639-3: nkr
- Glottolog: nuku1260
- ELP: Nukuoro
- {Nukuoro is classified as Definitely Endangered by the UNESCO Atlas of the World's Languages in Danger.

The Nukuoro language is an Ellicean language spoken by about 1,200 people on Nukuoro and Pohnpei—two islands of Pohnpei State within the Federated States of Micronesia. Nukuoro is a remote coral atoll with a population of about 150, where the primary language is Nukuoro. An additional several hundred Nukuoro speakers live in Kolonia, Pohnpei, with smaller diaspora communities elsewhere in Micronesia and in the United States. Most Nukuoro speakers, particularly those that live away from Nukuoro Atoll, are multilingual in Pohnpeian and/or English; some older Nukuoro speakers also know German or Japanese.

== Classification ==
Nukuoro belongs to the Polynesian language family, a group of about 30 languages spoken on islands throughout the remote Pacific Ocean. The Polynesian language family is a branch of the Oceanic subgroup of the Austronesian family. It is closely related to other Polynesian languages, with considerable phonological and lexical similarities. Within the Polynesian branch, Nukuoro is a member of the Polynesian Outliers, which are spoken by island populations in Micronesia, Papua New Guinea, the Solomon Islands, Vanuatu, and New Caledonia. More specifically, it is thought that Nukuoro is part of the Ellicean subgroup, which includes Samoan and several Outlier languages, such as Nukuoro. Of this Northern Outlier group (Nukuoro, Kapingamarangi, Nukuria, Takuu, Nukumanu, Luangiua, and Sikaiana), Nukuoro branches off into a further subgroup, termed the Carolinean Outliers, as proposed by Wilson (2012). This subgroup houses Nukuoro and its closest relative, Kapingamarangi. Kapingamarangi is the only other Polynesian language found in Micronesia. While the two languages are not mutually intelligible, it is nonetheless possible for a speaker of one language to make themselves understood to a speaker of the other with some difficulty.

== Language use and orthography ==
=== Population ===
The primary language spoken on the Nukuoro atoll is Nukuoro. In 1965 there were approximately 400 speakers. 260 of these speakers resided on the atoll, 125 lived on Ponape, the District Center, and a few others were spread out on the other islands in the District. The current population is estimated to be at about 1,000 speakers.

=== Orthography ===
The Nukuoro writing system was developed by Chief Leka in the 1920s, perhaps with the assistance of resident Europeans or missionaries in Ponape. It is known and used in some form by nearly all Nukuoro speakers, and has been the educational standard since its creation. The Nukuoro orthography differs from other Polynesian orthographies in that voiceless stop phonemes /p t k/ are written using the letters b d g, a choice that probably stems from the fact that Nukuoro voiceless stops are unaspirated like English voiced stops.

== Phonology ==
=== Vowels ===
There are 5 vowel qualities in Nukuoro: /a, e, i, o, u/. Vowel length is contrastive, and long vowels are represented by writing the vowel symbol twice. Long vowels are about twice as long as a short vowel, and are not rearticulated. The phonemic geminate /aː/ is often realized phonetically as [æ].

Monophthongs
	Short		Long	
	front	back	front	back
Close	i	u	iː	uː
Mid	e	o	eː	oː
Open	a		aː	

=== Consonants ===
There are 10 consonants in Nukuoro, each of which is contrastive for length. Geminate consonants are articulated for about twice as long as a singleton consonant, with the exception of stops and taps: geminate stops are articulated with increased aspiration, and geminate taps are articulated as a long, pre-voiced dental or retroflex stop. Geminate consonants are typically found stem-initially, and are often created by reduplication.

Consonants
	Labial	Alveolar	Velar	Glottal
Stop	p pː	t tː	k kː	
Fricative	v vː	s sː		h hː
Nasal	m mː	n nː	ŋ ŋː	
Tap		ɾ ɾː		

Like many Polynesian languages, Nukuoro has only three stops in its phonemic inventory: /p/, /t/, and /k/. These stops are unaspirated and can be variably voiced, but are phonemically voiceless. The orthography of Nukuoro represents these voiceless stops with b, d, g. The alveolar tap /ɾ/ is represented in Nukuoro orthography using the letter l, although early records of Nukuoro (and in fact, the spelling of the language name itself) use r.

Since singleton /p/, /t/, /k/ are written with b, d, g, geminate /p/, /t/, /k/ are written with p, t, k. Geminated /m/, /n/, /s/, /h/, /ɾ/ are represented with double letters (mm, nn, ss, hh, ll), and geminated /ŋ/ is written as nng.

=== Syllable structure ===
Syllables take the shapes V, VV, VVV, CV, CVV and CVVV. All possible V and VV combinations occur. All possible CV combinations occur except /vu/. The first member of a diphthong is always the syllabic peak when the syllable is stressed; elsewhere there is little difference between members, the peak of sonority tending to occur on the most naturally sonorous vowel.

== Grammar ==
=== Reduplication ===
Reduplication is one of the most productive morphological processes in Nukuoro. Reduplication is most common for adjectives and verbs.

There are two types of reduplication in Nukuoro: phoneme reduplication, which doubles the first sound to make a geminate, and full reduplication, which copies the first two syllables.

Phoneme reduplication usually differentiates between singular and plural.

bedi → pedi
fat.SG {} fat.PL

lava → llava
finished.SG {} finished.PL

Full reduplication indicates that an event happens repeatedly.

galo → galogalo
look {} {look all around}

seni → seniseni
sleep {} oversleep

daba → dabadaba
{flash of light} {} {twinkling, flashing}

=== Basic clause structure ===
The basic word order in Nukuoro is Subject-Verb-Object, but there are also cases of Verb-Subject-Object.

Template for a basic Nukuoro sentence with example:

Au e dugu ange {de beebaa} {gi honga tebele}.
1SG NPST put DIR.3 {DET book} {to top DET.table}
subject aspect verb particles object {prepositional phrase}
'I put the book on the table.'

Verbs generally do not show any agreement or inflection, and nouns are not marked morphologically for case. Historically, Nukuoro had an ergative-absolutive alignment, a system retained in many related languages.

=== Pronouns ===
==== Basic pronouns ====
Nukuoro distinguishes singular, dual, and plural, as well as inclusive and exclusive we.

		singular	dual	plural
1st person	exclusive	au	gidaau	gidaadeu
1st person	inclusive	au	gimaau	gimaadeu
2nd person		goe	gooluu	goodou
3rd person		ia	gilaau	gilaadeu

==== Genitive pronouns ====
The genitive pronouns are built off the basic pronoun paradigm.

The a/o distinction marks alienability: o marks inalienable possession, and a marks alienable possession. Some genitive pronouns do not mark the a vs. o distinction and are used for both.

		Paradigm for possessed singulars			Paradigm for possessed plurals		
		singular	dual	plural	singular	dual	plural
1st person	exclusive	dagu/dogu	taau	taadeu	agu/ogu	adaau/odaau	adaadeu/odaadeu
1st person	inclusive	dagu/dogu	demaau	demaadeu	agu/ogu	amaau/omaau	amaadeu/omaadeu
2nd person		dau/doo	dooluu	doodou	au/oo	ooluu	oodou
3rd person		dana/dono	delaau	delaadeu	ana/ono	alaau/olaau	alaadeu/olaadeu

=== Aspect markers ===
Aspect, as opposed to tense, marks "[the] different ways of viewing the internal temporal constituency of a situation".

e	general/imperfective
ne	perfective
nogo	past imperfective
gu	inchoative
ga	prospective
gi	subjunctive mood
kana	negative purporsive ("lest")
goi	continuative ("still")
tigi	negative continuative ("not yet")

== Endangerment ==
=== Materials ===
There are few solid resources for the Nukuoro language. The primary and probably most informative one is Vern Carroll's book An Outline of the Structure of the Language of Nukuoro. There is also a Nukuoro Lexicon that has English to Nukuoro and Nukuoro to English, as well as grammar notes.

In 2013, Gregory D.S. Anderson and K. David Harrison of Living Tongues Institute for Endangered Languages created the Nukuoro Talking Dictionary, a digital lexicon that includes sound recordings of Nukuoro words. This lexicon was initially populated with sound recordings from Nukuoro speakers Johnny Rudolph, Maynard Henry, and Kurt Erwin. This dictionary continues to be augmented by speakers and linguists and includes over 1000 audio tokens.

=== Vitality ===
Nukuoro is listed as a developing language. Ethnologue states that this means it is in vigorous use but isn't yet widespread. It is being transmitted to children, and is used in schools, government, and daily life. After World War II, there were already efforts to help preserve the language as the United States set up an elementary school taught completely in Nukuoro. The population of speakers also increased from 400 to 1000 since 1965, which shows positive growth.

== See also ==
- Kapingamarangi language
- Polynesian outlier
- Polynesian languages
- Tokelauan language
