= Nukumanu language =

Endangered Polynesian language of Papua New Guinea

Nukumanu
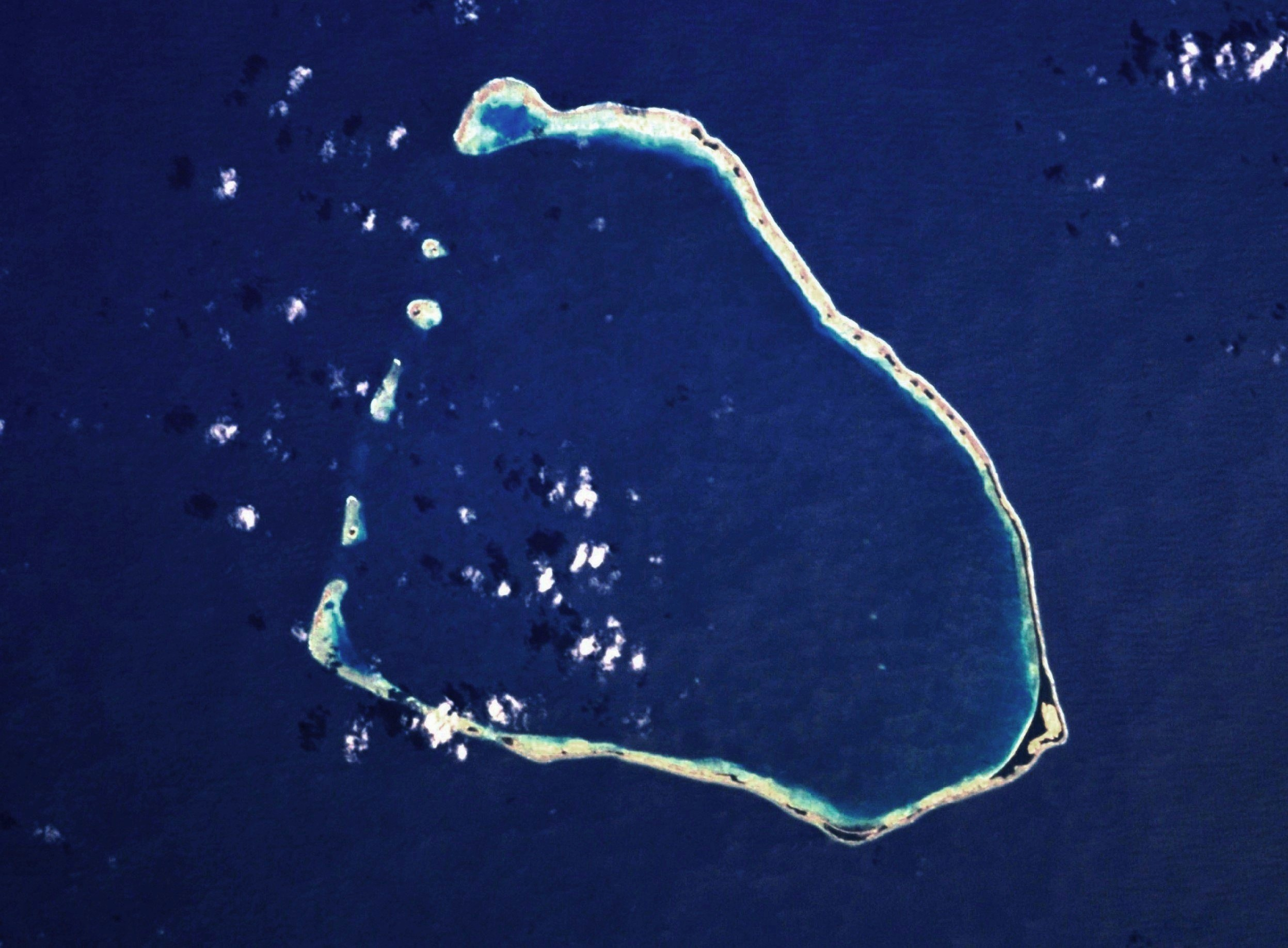
- Native to: Papua New Guinea
- Region: Nukumanu
- Native speakers: 700 (2003)
- Language family: Austronesian: Malayo-Polynesian; Oceanic; Polynesian; Ellicean; Nukumanu

Language codes
- ISO 639-3: nuq
- Glottolog: nuku1258

Nukumanu is a Polynesian language, spoken by about 700 people on Nukumanu in the eastern islands of Papua New Guinea. It is one of the most endangered languages in the region.

== Vocabulary ==
English-Nukumanu Vocabulary
English	Nukumanu
Coconut palm	níu
Breadfruit tree	'úlu
Banana	hŭki
Hibiscus	hau
Sugar cane	kólo
Tree	náku
Yams	ŭhi
A large red berry with no core	puáta
A type of fruit with a hard shell	tóno
A type of hardwood shrub	heníe
Red (colour)	má
Green (colour)	eúli
Dark (as in deep water/far away)	upála
