= Proto-Polynesian language =

Ancestor of the Polynesian languages

Proto-Polynesian
- PPn
- Reconstruction of: Polynesian languages
- Region: Tonga, Samoa, and nearby islands
- Era: 800—200 BCE
- Reconstructed ancestors: Proto-Austronesian: Proto-Malayo-Polynesian; Proto-Oceanic; Proto-Central Pacific

Proto-Polynesian (abbreviated PPn) is the reconstructed proto-language from which all modern Polynesian languages descend. It is a descendant of the Proto-Oceanic language (the language associated with the Lapita civilization), itself a descendant of Proto-Austronesian. The homeland of Proto-Polynesian speakers is believed to have been Tonga, Samoa, and nearby islands.

== Phonology ==
Proto-Polynesian has a small phonological inventory, with 13 consonants and 5 vowels.

=== Consonants ===
	Bilabial	Alveolar	Velar	Glottal
Nasal	*m	*n	*ŋ	
Plosive	*p	*t	*k	*ʔ
Fricative	*f	*s		*h
Approximant	*w	*l		
Trill		*r		

=== Vowels ===
Proto-Polynesian had five vowels, /a/ /e/ /i/ /o/ /u/, with no length distinction. In a number of daughter languages, successive sequences of vowels came together to produce long vowels and diphthongs, and in some languages these sounds later became phonemic.

=== Sound correspondences ===
Following principles of the Comparative method, it is possible to observe regular sound correspondences among Polynesian languages, and to reconstruct the most likely protophoneme for every ancestral step.

Proto-Polynesian	*p	*t/*ti	*k	*m	*n	*ŋ	*w	*f	*s	*h	*ʔ	*l	*r
Niuean	p	t	k	m	n	ŋ	v	f	Ø	h	h	l	l/Ø
Niuafoʻou	p	t/s	k	m	n	ŋ	v	f	ʔ/Ø	h/Ø	h	l	l/Ø
Tongan	p	t/s	k	m	n	ŋ	v	f	h	h	ʔ	l	l/Ø
Proto-Nuclear-Polynesian	*p	*t/*ti	*k	*m	*n	*ŋ	*w	*f	*s	*Ø	*ʔ	*l	
Vaeakau-Taumako	p	t/s/h	k	m	n	ŋ	v	f/h	s/h	Ø	Ø	l	
Samoan	p	t~k	ʔ	m	n	ŋ	v	f	s	Ø	Ø	l	
Wallisian	p	t/s	k	m	n	ŋ	v	f	h	Ø	ʔ	l	
East Futunan	p	t	k	m	n	ŋ	v	f	s	Ø	ʔ/Ø	l	
Tokelauan	p	t	k	m	n	ŋ	v	f	h	Ø	Ø	l	
Tuvaluan	p	t	k	m	n	ŋ	v	f	s	Ø	Ø	l	
Pukapukan	p	t	k	m	n	ŋ	v	w	θʲ	Ø	Ø	l	
Kapingamarangi	p	t	k	m	n	ŋ	w	h	h	Ø	Ø	l	
Nukuoroan	p	t	k	m	n	ŋ	v	h	s	Ø	Ø	l	
Sikaiana	p	t	k	m	n	n	v	f/h	s	Ø	Ø	l	
Takuu	p	t	k	m	n	n	v	f	s	Ø	Ø	r/l	
Tikopian, Emae	p	t	k	m	n	ŋ	v	f	s	Ø	Ø	ɾ	
Mele	p	t/t͡ɕ	k	m	n	ŋ	v	f	s	Ø	Ø	ɾ	
Futuna-Aniwa	p	t/ʃ	k	m	n	ŋ	β	f	s/ʃ	Ø	Ø	r/l	
Rennellese	p	t	k	m	n	ŋ	β	h/p/β	s/h	Ø	Ø	ⁿg	
Anuta	p	t~s	k	m	n	ŋ	v~w	p	t~s	Ø	Ø	l~r	
Luangiua	p	k	ʔ	m	ŋ	ŋ	v	h	h	Ø	Ø	l~r	
Proto-Eastern-Polynesian	*p	*t	*k	*m	*n	*ŋ	*w	*f	*h	*Ø	*ʔ/Ø	*l	
Tongareva	p	t	k	m	n	ŋ	v	v/h	s/h	Ø	Ø	l	
Rapa Nui	p	t	k	m	n	ŋ	v	v/h	h	Ø	ʔ/Ø	ɾ	
Tuamotuan, Manihiki	p	t	k	m	n	ŋ	v	f/h/v	h	Ø	Ø	ɾ	
Māori	p	t	k	m	n	ŋ	w	ɸ/h	h	Ø	Ø	ɾ	
Rapa Iti	p	t	k	m	n	ŋ	v	Ø/ʔ	h/ʔ	Ø	Ø	ɾ	
Mangareva, Cook Islands Māori	p	t	k	m	n	ŋ	v	ʔ/v	ʔ	Ø	Ø	ɾ	
Rurutu	p	t	ʔ	m	n	ʔ	v	ʔ/f	ʔ	Ø	Ø	ɾ	
Tahitian	p	t	ʔ	m	n	ʔ	v	f/h/v	h	Ø	Ø	ɾ	
Ra’ivavae	p	t	ʔ	m	n	ʔ	v	h	h	Ø	Ø	g	
N. Marquesan	p	t	k/ʔ	m	n	n/k	v	h	h	Ø	Ø	ʔ	
S. Marquesan	p	t	ʔ	m	n	n	v	f/h	h	Ø	Ø	ʔ	
Hawaiian	p	t~k	ʔ	m	n	n	v~w	h/w	h	Ø	Ø	l	

== Vocabulary ==
The following is a table of some sample vocabulary as it is represented orthographically in various languages. All instances of ⟨ʻ⟩ represent a glottal stop, IPA /ʔ/. All instances of ⟨ng⟩ and Samoan ⟨g⟩ represent the single phoneme /ŋ/. The letter ⟨r⟩ in all cases represents voiced alveolar tap /ɾ/, not /r/.

Polynesian vocabulary
Proto-Polynesian	Tongan	Niuean	Samoan	Rapa Nui	Tahitian	Māori	Cook Islands Māori	S. Marquesan	Hawaiian	English
*taŋata	tangata	tangata	tagata	tangata	ta'ata	tangata	tangata	ʻenata	kanaka	person
*sina	hina	hina	sina	hina	hinahina	hina	ʻina		hina	grey-haired
*kanahe	kanahe	kanahe	ʻanae		'anae	kanae	kanae		ʻanae	mullet
*tiale	siale	tiale	tiale	tiare	tiare	tīare	tiare		kiele	flower
*waka	vaka	vaka	vaʻa	vaka	va'a	waka	vaka	vaka	waʻa	canoe
*fafine	fefine	fifine	fafine	vi'e/vahine	vahine	wahine	vaʻine	vehine	wahine	woman
*matuʔa	mātu'a	motua	matua	matuʻa	metua	mātua	metua, matua	motua	makua	parent
*rua	ua	ua	lua	rua	rua	rua	rua	ʻua	lua	two
*tolu	tolu	tolu	tolu	toru	toru	toru	toru	toʻu	kolu	three

== See also ==
- Proto-Oceanic language
- Proto-Austronesian language
- Proto-Malayo-Polynesian language
- Proto-Philippine language
