= Tongan language =

Polynesian language

Tongan
- lea faka-Tonga
- Native to: Tonga; significant immigrant community in New Zealand and the United States
- Ethnicity: Tongans
- Native speakers: (187,000: 96,000 in Tonga cited 1998) 73,000 elsewhere (no date), primarily in NZ, U.S., and Australia
- Language family: Austronesian: Malayo-Polynesian; Oceanic; Polynesian; Tongic; Tongan
- Early forms: Proto-Austronesian: Proto-Malayo-Polynesian; Proto-Oceanic; Proto-Polynesian; Proto-Tongic; Old Tongan
- Standard forms: Standard Tongan
- Dialects: Niuas; Vava'u; Ha'apai; Tonga-Tapu 'Eua
- Writing system: Latin-based

Official status
- Official language in: Tonga

Language codes
- ISO 639-1: to
- ISO 639-2: ton
- ISO 639-3: ton
- Glottolog: tong1325

Tongan (English pronunciation: /ˈtɒŋ(ɡ)ən/ TONG-(g)ən; (Note: Both pronunciations are used in English, although the one without /ɡ/ is preferred as it is closer to the Tongan pronunciation. In North America and the United Kingdom, both pronunciations are used, while the preferred pronunciation (i.e the one without /ɡ/) is almost always used in Australia, New Zealand and the Pacific Islands.) lea fakatonga) is an Austronesian language of the Polynesian branch native to the island nation of Tonga. It has around 187,000 speakers. It uses the word order verb–subject–object and, although primarily spoken, the written form uses Latin script.

== Related languages ==
Tongan is one of the multiple languages in the Polynesian branch of the Austronesian languages, along with Hawaiian, Cook islander, Māori, and Tahitian, for example. Together with Niuean, and possibly Niuafo’ouan, it forms the Tongic subgroup of Polynesian.

Tongan is unusual among Polynesian languages in that it has a so-called definitive accent. As with all Polynesian languages, Tongan has adapted the phonological system of proto-Polynesian.

1. Tongan has retained the original proto-Polynesian *h, but has merged it with the original *s as /h/. (The /s/ found in modern Tongan derives from *t before high front vowels). Most Polynesian languages have lost the original proto-Polynesian glottal stop /ʔ/; however, it has been retained in Tongan and a few other languages including Rapa Nui. (Note: The glottal stop in most other Polynesian languages are the reflexes of other consonants of proto-Polynesian; for example, the glottal stop of Samoan and Hawaiian is a reflex of the original *k; the glottal stop of Cook Islands Māori represents a merger of the original *f and *s. Tongan does not show changes such as the *t to /k/ and *ŋ to /n/ of Hawaiian; nor has Tongan shifted *f to /h/. Although Tongan, Samoan and other Western Polynesian languages are not affected by a change in Central Eastern Polynesian languages (such as New Zealand Māori) involving the dissimilation of /faf/ to /wah/, Tongan has vowel changes (as seen in monumanu from original manumanu) which are not a feature of other languages.)
2. In proto-Polynesian, *r and *l were distinct phonemes, but in most Polynesian languages they have merged, represented orthographically as ⟨r⟩ in most East Polynesian languages, and as ⟨l⟩ in most West Polynesian languages. However, the distinction can be reconstructed because Tongan kept the *l but lost the *r. (Note: This loss may be quite recent. The word lua 'two' is still found in some placenames and archaic texts. Marama 'light' thus became maama, and the two successive a's are still pronounced separately, not yet contracted to *māma. On the other hand, toro 'sugarcane' already has become tō (still tolo in Samoan).)

Tongan has heavily influenced the Wallisian language after Tongans colonized the island of ʻUvea in the 15th and 16th centuries.

Polynesian sound correspondences
Phoneme	Proto-Polynesian	Tongan	Niuean	Samoan	Rapa Nui	Tahitian	Māori	Cook Is. Māori	Hawaiian	English
/ŋ/	*taŋata	tangata	tagata	tagata	tangata	taʻata	tangata	tangata	kanaka	person
/s/	*sina	hina	hina	sina	hina	hinahina	hina	ʻina	hina	grey-haired
/h/	*kanahe	kanahe	kanahe	ʻanae		ʻanae	kanae	kanae	ʻanae	mullet (fish)
/ti/	*tiale	siale	tiale	tiale	tiare	tiare	tīare	tiare	kiele	gardenia
/k/	*waka	vaka	vaka	vaʻa	vaka	vaʻa	waka	vaka	waʻa	canoe
/f/	*fafine	fefine	fifine	fafine	vahine	vahine	wahine	vaʻine	wahine	woman
/ʔ/	*matuqa (Note: Glottal stop is represented as 'q' in reconstructed Proto-Polynesian words.)	matuʻa	matua	matua	matuʻa	metua	matua	metua, matua	makua	parent
/r/	*rua	ua	ua	lua	rua	rua (Note: Archaic: the usual word in today's Tahitian is piti.)	rua	rua	ʻelua	two
/l/	*tolu	tolu	tolu	tolu	toru	toru	toru	toru	ʻekolu	three

== Writing ==
=== History ===
The earliest attempts to transcribe the Tongan language were made by Willem Schouten and Jacob Le Maire of the Dutch East India Company when they first arrived in 1616. They transcribed a limited number of nouns and verbs using phonetic Dutch spelling and added them to a growing list of Polynesian vocabulary. Abel Tasman, also of the Dutch East India Company, attempted to converse with indigenous Tongans using vocabulary from this list when he arrived on Tongatapu on 20 January 1643, although he was poorly understood, likely using words added from different Polynesian languages.

=== Alphabet ===
Tongan is presently written in a subset of the Latin script. In the old, "missionary" alphabet, the order of the letters was modified: the vowels were put first and then followed by the consonants: a, e, i, o, u, with variation of letter ā. That was still so as of the Privy Council decision of 1943 on the orthography of the Tongan language. However, C. M. Churchward's grammar and dictionary favoured the standard European alphabetical order, which, since his time, has been in use exclusively:

Tongan alphabet (pre-1943)
IPA
a	e	f	h	i	tʃ	k	l	m	n	ŋ	o	p	s	t	u	v	ʔ
Grapheme
a	e	f	h	i	j	k	l	m	n	g	o	b	s	t	u	v	ʻ

Tongan alphabet (post-1943)
IPA
a	e	f	h	i	k	l	m	n	ŋ	o	p	s	t	u	v	ʔ
Grapheme
a	e	f	h	i	k	l	m	n	ng	o	p	s	t	u	v	ʻ

- The glottal stop is represented by the modifier letter turned comma, named fakauʻa. See also ʻOkina.
- Vowels with macron ⟨ā ē ī ō ū⟩ come after plain ones in alphabetical order.

/tʃ/ disappeared in the beginning of the 20th century, merging with /s/. By 1943, ⟨j⟩ was no longer used. Consequently, many words written with s in Tongan are cognate to those with t in other Polynesian languages:

- Masisi (a star name) in Tongan and Matiti in Tokelauan
- siale (Gardenia taitensis) in Tongan and tiare in Tahitian

This seems to be a natural development, as /tʃ/ in many Polynesian languages derived from Proto-Polynesian /ti/.

== Phonology ==
Consonants
		Labial	Alveolar	Velar	Glottal
Nasal		m	n	ŋ	
Plosive		p	t	k	ʔ
Fricative	voiceless	f	s	(x)	h
Fricative	voiced	v		(ɣ)	
Lateral			l		

- /l/ may also be heard as a lateral tap [ɺ].
- /k/ sometimes spirantizes to [x] or [ɣ] intervocalically.

Vowels
	Front	Central	Back
Close	i		u
Mid	e		o
Open		a	

- Word-final unstressed vowels, especially /i u/, can be devoiced.
- Final unstressed /i/ can also be elided completely, e.g. matangi [ma.ˈtaŋ].

=== Phonotactics ===
- Tongan has a three-way laryngeal contrast in initial position; words may begin with /ʔ/, /h/, or a vowel. This is a rare contrast across languages; it is attested in other Malayo-Polynesian languages, and is also said to be marginal in some Mayan languages.
  - ʻā /ˈʔaa/ 'fence'
  - hā /ˈhaa/ 'appear'
  - ā /ˈaa/ 'heat sticks over fire'
- Syllables are of the form (C)V, where (C) is an optional onset consonant and V is a vowel. Consonant clusters and coda consonants do not occur, except when /i/ is elided.
- Long homorganic vowel sequences are usually analysed as being sequences of identical vowels.
- Sequences of non-identical vowels are likewise considered not to be diphthongs, though it has been observed that some sequences may sometimes be realized as diphthongs.
- As with other Polynesian languages, words in Tongan may have sequences of many vowels. Sequences of all vowels are permitted, and sequences of up to seven vowels are attested:
  - aoao /ˌaoˈao/ 'build round and round'
  - ouau /ˌouˈau/ 'rite, ordinance'
  - auauni /ˌauaˈuni/ 'consist of several folds'
  - ngāueʻi /ˌŋaauˈeʔi/ 'utilize'
  - lōua /ˌlooˈua/ 'double, two-fold'
  - iauē /ˌiauˈee/ (expression of surprise)
  - fakaaoao /ˌfakaaoˈao/ 'act like a despot'
  - uōuō /uˌoouˈoo/ 'be crowded, happy'
  - feōōaki /feˌooooˈaki/ 'go back and forth'
  - ʻoiauē /ˌʔoiauˈee/ 'alas'

=== Stress ===
Stress normally falls on the next-to-last syllable of a word with two or more syllables:

- móhe /ˈmo.he/ 'sleep'
- mohénga /mo.ˈhe.ŋa/ 'bed'

If, however, the last vowel is long, it takes the stress:

- kumā /ku.ˈmaː/ 'mouse'

The stress also shifts to the last vowel if the next word is an enclitic:

- fále /ˈfa.le/ 'house'
- falé ni /fa.ˈle ni/ 'this house'

Stress can shift to the last syllable, including an enclitic, in case of the definitive accent:

- mohengá /mo.he.ˈŋa/ 'that particular bed'
- fale ní /fa.le ˈni/ 'this particular house'

It is also here that a long vowel can be split into two short ones:

- pō /poː/ 'night'
- poó ni /po.ˈo ni/ 'this night'
- pō ní /poː ˈni/ 'this particular night'

Or the opposite:

- maáma /ma.ˈa.ma/ 'light'
- māmá ni /maː.ˈma ni/ 'this light'
- maama ní /ma.a.ma ˈni/ 'this particular light'

There are some exceptions to the above general rules. The stress accent is normally not written, except where it is to indicate the definitive accent or fakamamafa. But here, too, people often neglect to write it, only using it when the proper stress cannot be easily derived from the context.

Although the acute accent has been available on most personal computers from their early days onwards, when Tongan newspapers started to use computers around 1990 to produce their papers, they were unable to find, or failed to enter, the proper keystrokes, and it grew into a habit to put the accent after the vowel instead of on it: not á but a´. But as this distance seemed to be too big, a demand arose for Tongan fonts where the acute accent was shifted to the right, a position halfway in between the two extremes above. Most papers still follow this practice.

== Grammar ==
=== Articles ===
English uses only two articles:

- indefinite a
- definite the

By contrast, Tongan has three articles, and possessives also have a three-level definiteness distinction:

- indefinite, nonspecific: ha. Example: ko ha fale ('a house', 'any house' - the speaker has no specific house in mind, any house will satisfy this description, e.g. 'I want to buy a house')
- indefinite, specific: (h)e. Example: ko e fale ('a (particular) house' - the speaker has a specific house in mind, but the listener is not expected to know which house, e.g. 'I bought a house')
- definite, specific: (h)e with the shifted ultimate stress. Example: ko e falé ('the house', - the speaker has a specific house in mind and the listener is expected to know which one from context, e.g. 'I bought the house I told you about').

=== Registers ===
There are three registers which consist of

- ordinary words (the normal language)
- honorific words (the language for the chiefs)
- regal words (the language for the king)

There are also further distinctions between

- polite words (used for more formal contexts)
- derogatory words (used for informal contexts, or to indicate humility)

For example, the phrase "Come and eat!" translates to:

- ordinary: haʻu ʻo kai (come and eat!); Friends, family members and so forth may say this to each other when invited for dinner.
- honorific: meʻa mai pea ʻilo (come and eat!); The proper used towards chiefs, particularly the nobles, but it may also be used by employees towards their bosses, or in other similar situations. When talking about chiefs, however, it is always used, even if they are not actually present, but in other situations only on formal occasions. A complication to the beginning student of Tongan is that such words very often also have an alternative meaning in the ordinary register: meʻa (thing) and ʻilo (know, find).
- regal: hāʻele mai pea taumafa (come and eat!); Used towards the king or God. The same considerations as for the honorific register apply. Hāʻele is one of the regal words which have become the normal word in other Polynesian languages.

=== Pronouns ===
The Tongan language distinguishes three numbers: singular, dual, and plural. They appear as the three major columns in the tables below.

The Tongan language distinguishes four persons: First person exclusive, first person inclusive, second person and third person. They appear as the four major rows in the tables below. This gives us 12 main groups.

==== Subjective and objective ====
In addition, possessive pronouns are either alienable (reddish) or inalienable (greenish), which Churchward termed subjective and objective. This marks a distinction that has been referred to, in some analyses of other Polynesian languages, as a-possession versus o-possession, respectively, (Note: These a and o refer to the characteristic vowel used in those pronouns. In Tongan, however, this distinction is much less clear, and rather a characteristic for the indefinite and definite forms respectively. Use of the a & o terms therefore is not favoured.) though more Tongan-appropriate version would be ʻe-possession and ho-possession.

Subjective and objective are fitting labels when dealing with verbs: ʻeku taki "my leading" vs. hoku taki "my being led". However, this is less apt when used on nouns. Indeed, in most contexts hoku taki would be interpreted as "my leader", as a noun rather than a verb. What then of nouns that have no real verb interpretation, such as fale "house"?

Churchward himself laid out the distinction thus:

But what about those innumerable cases in which the possessive can hardly be said to correspond either to the subject or to the object of a verb? What, for example, is the rule or the guiding principle, which lies behind the fact that a Tongan says ʻeku paʻanga for ' my money' but hoku fale for 'my house'? It may be stated as follows: the use of ʻeku for 'my' implies that I am active, influential, or formative, &c., towards the thing mentioned, whereas the use of hoku for 'my' implies that the thing mentioned is active, influential, or formative, &c., towards me. Or, provided that we give a sufficiently wide meaning to the word 'impress', we may say, perhaps, that ʻeku is used in reference to things upon which I impress myself, while hoku is used in reference to things which impress themselves upon me.

ʻE possessives are generally used for:

- Goods, money, tools, utensils, instruments, weapons, vehicles, and other possessions which the subject owns or uses (ʻeku paʻanga, "my money")
- Animals or birds which the subjects owns or uses (ʻeku fanga puaka, "my pigs")
- Things which the subject eats, drinks, or smokes (ʻeku meʻakai, "my food")
- Things which the subject originates, makes, mends, carries, or otherwise deals with (ʻeku kavenga, "my burden")
- Persons in the subject's employ, under their control, or in their care (ʻeku tamaioʻeiki "my male servant")

Ho possessives are generally used for

- Things which are a part of the subject or 'unalienable' from the subject, such as body parts (hoku sino, "my body")
- Persons or things which represent the subject (hoku hingoa, "my name")
- The subject's relatives, friends, associates, or enemies (hoku hoa, "my companion (spouse)")
- Things which are provided for the subject or devolve to them or fall to their lot (hoku tofiʻa, "my inheritance")
- In general, persons or things which surround, support, or control the subject, or on which the subject depends (hoku kolo, "my village/town")

There are plenty of exceptions which do not fall under the guidelines above, for instance, ʻeku tamai, "my father". The number of exceptions is large enough to make the alienable and inalienable distinction appear on the surface to be as arbitrary as the grammatical gender distinction for Romance languages, but by and large the above guidelines hold true.

===== Cardinal pronouns =====
The cardinal pronouns are the main personal pronouns which in Tongan can either be preposed (before the verb, light colour) or postposed (after the verb, dark colour). The first are the normal alienable possessive pronouns, the latter the stressed alienable pronouns, which are sometimes used as reflexive pronouns, or with kia te in front the inalienable possessive forms. (There is no possession involved in the cardinal pronouns and therefore no alienable or inalienable forms).

Cardinal pronouns
		Position	Singular	Dual	Plural
1st person	exclusive (I, we, us)	preposed	u, ou, ku	ma	mau
1st person	exclusive (I, we, us)	postposed	au	kimaua	kimautolu
1st person	inclusive (one, we, us)	preposed	te	ta	tau
1st person	inclusive (one, we, us)	postposed	kita	kitaua	kitautolu
2nd person		preposed	ke	mo	mou
2nd person		postposed	koe	kimoua	kimoutolu
3rd person		preposed	ne	na	nau
3rd person		postposed	ia	kinaua	kinautolu

- all the preposed pronouns of one syllable only (ku, u, ma, te, ta, ke, mo, ne, na) are enclitics which never can take the stress, but put it on the vowel in front of them. Example: ʻoku naú versus ʻokú na (not: ʻoku ná).
- first person singular, I uses u after kuo, te, ne, and also ka (becomes kau), pea, mo and ʻo; but uses ou after ʻoku; and uses ku after naʻa.
- first person inclusive (I and you) is somewhat of a misnomer, at least in the singular. The meanings of te and kita can often rendered as one, that is the modesty I.

Examples of use.

- Naʻa ku fehuʻi: I asked
- Naʻe fehuʻi (ʻe) au: I(!) asked (stressed)
- ʻOku ou fehuʻi au: I ask myself
- Te u fehuʻi kiate koe: I shall ask you
- Te ke tali kiate au: You will answer me
- Kapau te te fehuʻi: If one would ask
- Tau ō ki he hulohula?: Are we (all) going to the ball?
- Sinitalela, mau ō ki he hulohula: Cinderella, we go to the ball (... said the evil stepmother, and she went with two of her daughters, but not Cinderella)

Another archaic aspect of Tongan is the retention of preposed pronouns. They are used much less frequently in Samoan and have completely disappeared in East Polynesian languages, where the pronouns are cognate with the Tongan postposed form minus ki-. (We love you: ʻOku ʻofa kimautolu kia te kimoutolu; Māori: e aroha nei mātou i a koutou).

===== Possessive pronouns =====
The possessives for every person and number (1st person plural, 3rd person dual, etc.) can be further divided into normal or ordinary (light colour), emotional (medium colour) and emphatic (bright colour) forms. The latter is rarely used, but the two former are common and further subdivided in definite (saturated colour) and indefinite (greyish colour) forms.

Possessive pronouns
	definite or not	type	singular		dual		plural	
	definite or not	type	alienable^{2,5}	inalienable^{2,5}	alienable^{2,5}	inalienable^{2,5}	alienable^{2,5}	inalienable^{2,5}
1st person (exclusive) (my, our)	definite	ordinary	heʻeku^{1}	hoku	heʻema^{1}	homa	heʻemau^{1}	homau
1st person (exclusive) (my, our)	indefinite	ordinary	haʻaku	haku	haʻama	hama	haʻamau	hamau
1st person (exclusive) (my, our)	definite	emotional	siʻeku	siʻoku	siʻema	siʻoma	siʻemau	siʻomau
1st person (exclusive) (my, our)	indefinite	emotional	siʻaku	siʻaku	siʻama	siʻama	siʻamau	siʻamau
1st person (exclusive) (my, our)	emphatic^{3}		haʻaku	hoʻoku	haʻamaua	hoʻomaua	haʻamautolu	hoʻomautolu
1st person (inclusive)^{4} (my, our)	definite	ordinary	heʻete^{1}	hoto	heʻeta^{1}	hota	heʻetau^{1}	hotau
1st person (inclusive)^{4} (my, our)	indefinite	ordinary	haʻate	hato	haʻata	hata	haʻatau	hatau
1st person (inclusive)^{4} (my, our)	definite	emotional	siʻete	siʻoto	siʻeta	siʻota	siʻetau	siʻotau
1st person (inclusive)^{4} (my, our)	indefinite	emotional	siʻate	siʻato	siʻata	siʻata	siʻatau	siʻatau
1st person (inclusive)^{4} (my, our)	emphatic^{3}		haʻata	hoʻota	haʻataua	hoʻotaua	haʻatautolu	hoʻotautolu
2nd person (your)	definite	ordinary	hoʻo	ho	hoʻomo	homo	hoʻomou	homou
2nd person (your)	indefinite	ordinary	haʻo	hao	haʻamo	hamo	haʻamou	hamou
2nd person (your)	definite	emotional	siʻo	siʻo	siʻomo	siʻomo	siʻomou	siʻomou
2nd person (your)	indefinite	emotional	siʻao	siʻao	siʻamo	siʻamo	siʻamou	siʻamou
2nd person (your)	emphatic^{3}		haʻau	hoʻou	haʻamoua	hoʻomoua	haʻamoutolu	hoʻomoutolu
3rd person (his, her, its, their)	definite	ordinary	heʻene^{1}	hono	heʻena^{1}	hona	heʻenau^{1}	honau
3rd person (his, her, its, their)	indefinite	ordinary	haʻane	hano	haʻana	hana	haʻanau	hanau
3rd person (his, her, its, their)	definite	emotional	siʻene	siʻono	siʻena	siʻona	siʻenau	siʻonau
3rd person (his, her, its, their)	indefinite	emotional	siʻane	siʻano	siʻana	siʻana	siʻanau	siʻanau
3rd person (his, her, its, their)	emphatic^{3}		haʻana	hoʻona	haʻanaua	hoʻonaua	haʻanautolu	hoʻonautolu

Notes:

1. the ordinary definite possessives starting with he (in italics) drop this prefix after any word except ʻi, ki, mei, ʻe. Example: ko ʻeku tohi, my book; ʻi heʻeku tohi, in my book.
2. all ordinary alienable possessive forms contain a fakauʻa, the inalienable forms do not.
3. the emphatic forms are not often used, but if they are, they take the definitive accent from the following words (see below)
4. first person inclusive (me and you) is somewhat of a misnomer. The meanings of heʻete, hoto, etc. can often rendered as one's, that is the modesty me.
5. the choice between an alienable or inalienable possessive is determined by the word or phrase it refers to. For example: ko ho fale '(it is) your house' (inalienable), ko ho'o tohi, '(it is) your book' (alienable). *Ko ho tohi, ko hoʻo fale* are wrong. Some words can take either, but with a difference in meaning: ko ʻene taki 'his/her leadership'; ko hono taki 'his/her leader'.

Examples of use.

- ko haʻaku/haku kahoa: my garland (any garland from or for me)
- ko ʻeku/hoku kahoa: my garland (it is my garland)
- ko ʻeku/hoku kahoá: my garland, that particular one and no other
- ko heʻete/hoto kahoa: one's garland {mine in fact, but that is not important}
- ko siʻaku kahoa: my cherished garland (any cherished garland from or for me)
- ko siʻeku/siʻoku kahoa: my cherished garland (it is my cherished garland)
- ko haʻakú/hoʻokú kahoa: garland (emphatically mine) – that particular garland is mine and not someone else's
- ko homa kahoa: our garlands (exclusive: you and I are wearing them, but not the person we are talking to)
- ko hota kahoa: our garlands (inclusive: you and I are wearing them, and I am talking to you)

===== Other pronouns =====
These are the remainders: the pronominal adjectives (mine), indirect object pronouns or pronominal adverbs (for me) and the adverbial possessives (as me).

Other pronouns
	type	singular^{1}		dual		plural	
	type	alienable	inalienable	alienable	inalienable	alienable	inalienable
1st person (exclusive) (my, our)	pronominal adjective	ʻaʻaku	ʻoʻoku	ʻamaua	ʻomaua	ʻamautolu	ʻomautolu
1st person (exclusive) (my, our)	pronominal adverb	maʻaku	moʻoku	maʻamaua	moʻomaua	maʻamautolu	moʻomautolu
1st person (exclusive) (my, our)	adverbial possessive	maʻaku	moʻoku	maʻama	moʻoma	maʻamau	moʻomau
1st person (inclusive) (my, our)	pronominal adjective	ʻaʻata	ʻoʻota	ʻataua	ʻotaua	ʻatautolu	ʻotautolu
1st person (inclusive) (my, our)	pronominal adverb	maʻata	moʻota	maʻataua	moʻotaua	maʻatautolu	moʻotautolu
1st person (inclusive) (my, our)	adverbial possessive	maʻate	moʻoto	maʻata	moʻota	maʻatau	moʻotau
2nd person (your)	pronominal adjective	ʻaʻau	ʻoʻou	ʻamoua	ʻomoua	ʻamoutolu	ʻomoutolu
2nd person (your)	pronominal adverb	maʻau	moʻou	maʻamoua	moʻomoua	maʻamoutolu	moʻomoutolu
2nd person (your)	adverbial possessive	maʻo	moʻo	maʻamo	moʻomo	maʻamou	moʻomou
3rd person (his, her, its, their)	pronominal adjective	ʻaʻana	ʻoʻona	ʻanaua	ʻonaua	ʻanautolu	ʻonautolu
3rd person (his, her, its, their)	pronominal adverb	maʻana	moʻona	maʻanaua	moʻonaua	maʻanautolu	moʻonautolu
3rd person (his, her, its, their)	adverbial possessive	maʻane	moʻono	maʻana	moʻona	maʻanau	moʻonau

Notes:

1. the first syllable in all singular pronominal adjectives (in italics) is reduplicated and can be dropped for somewhat less emphasis
- the pronominal adjectives put a stronger emphasis on the possessor than the possessive pronouns do
- the use of the adverbial possessives is rare

Examples of use:

- ko hono valá: it is his/her/its clothing/dress
- ko e vala ʻona: it is his/her/its (!) clothing/dress
- ko e vala ʻoʻona: it is his/her/its (!!!) clothing/dress
- ko hono valá ʻona: it is his/her/its own clothing/dress
- ko hono vala ʻoná: it is his/her/its own clothing/dress; same as previous
- ko hono vala ʻoʻoná: it is his/her/its very own clothing/dress
- ʻoku ʻoʻona ʻa e valá ni: this clothing is his/hers/its
- ʻoku moʻona ʻa e valá: the clothing is for him/her/it
- ʻoange ia moʻono valá: give it (to him/her/it) as his/hers/its clothing

=== Numerals ===
0-9
0	noa				
1	taha	2	ua	3	tolu
4	fā	5	nima	6	ono
7	fitu	8	valu	9	hiva

In Tongan, "telephone-style" numerals can be used: reading numbers by simply saying their digits one by one. For 'simple' two-digit multiples of ten both the 'full-style' and 'telephone-style' numbers are in equally common use, while for other two-digit numbers the 'telephone-style' numbers are almost exclusively in use:

10-90 'tens'
#	'full-style'	'telephone-style'
10	hongofulu	taha-noa
20	ungofulu/uofulu	ua-noa
30	tolungofulu	tolu-noa
...

11-99
#	'full-style'	'telephone-style'
11	hongofulu ma taha	taha-taha
24	ungofulu ma fā	ua-fā
...

exceptions
#	Tongan
22	uo-ua
55	nime-nima
99	hive-hiva

100-999 'simple'
#	Tongan
100	teau
101	teau taha
110	teau hongofulu
120	teau-ua-noa
200	uongeau
300	tolungeau
...

100-999 'complex'
#	Tongan
111	taha-taha-taha
222	uo-uo-ua
482	fā-valu-ua
...

1000-
#	Tongan
1000	taha-afe
2000	ua-afe
...
10000	mano
100000	kilu
1000000	miliona
...

ʻOku fiha ia? (how much (does it cost)?) Paʻanga ʻe ua-nima-noa (T$2.50)

In addition there are special, traditional counting systems for fish, coconuts, yams, etc. (Cf. Classifier (linguistics).)

== Literature ==
Tongan has a very rich oral literature and is primarily a spoken, rather than written, language.

One of the first publications of Tongan texts was in William Mariner's grammar and dictionary of the Tongan language, edited and published in 1817 by John Martin as part of volume 2 of Mariner's Account of the Natives of the Tonga Islands, in the South Pacific Ocean. Orthography has changed since Mariner's time.

An annotated list of dictionaries and vocabularies of the Tongan language is available at the website of the Bibliographical Society of America under the resource heading 'Breon Mitchell": .

The Bible and the Book of Mormon were translated into Tongan and few other books were written in it.

There are several weekly and monthly magazines in Tongan, but there are no daily newspapers.

Weekly newspapers, some of them twice per week:

- Ko e Kalonikali ʻo Tonga
- Ko e Keleʻa
- Taimi ʻo Tonga
- Talaki
- Ko e Tauʻatāina
- Tonga Maʻa Tonga

Monthly or two-monthly papers, mostly church publications:

- Taumuʻa lelei (Catholic Church)
- Tohi fanongonongo (Free Wesleyan)
- Liahona (The Church of Jesus Christ of Latter-day Saints)
- ʻOfa ki Tonga (Tokaikolo)

== Calendar ==
The Tongan calendar was based on the phases of the moon and had 13 months. The main purpose of the calendar, for Tongans, was to determine the time for the planting and cultivation of yams (ufi), which were Tonga's most important staple food.

Traditional calendar
Traditional Month	Gregorian Calendar	Significance
Lihamuʻa	mid-November to early December	Warm weather, trees flower
Lihamui	mid-December to early January	Trees bear fruit
Vaimuʻa	mid-January to early February	Start of rainy season
Vaimui	mid-February to early March	
Fakaafu Moʻui	mid-March to early April	Start of cyclone season (fakaʻafu lit. 'sweltering'), new ufi tubers develop
Fakaaafu Mate	mid-April to early May	End (mate) of cyclone season
Hilingakelekele	mid-May to early June	ufi harvest (lit. 'uncovering from dirt')
Hilingameaʻa	mid-June to early July	End (meaʻa lit. 'clean') of ufi harvest
ʻAoʻao, ʻAoʻaokimasisiva	mid-July to early August	
Fuʻufuʻunekinanga	mid-August to early September	
ʻUluenga	mid-September to early October	ufi tubers develop and withers leaves (lit. 'yellow head')
Tanumanga	early October to late October	"burying" of new shoots from ufi tubers
ʻOʻoamofanongo	late October to early November	Limited water and food stock

Day	Tongan Term
Monday	Mōnite
Tuesday	Tūsite
Wednesday	Pulelulu
Thursday	Tuʻapulelulu
Friday	Falaite
Saturday	Tokonaki
Sunday	Sāpate

Month	Transliteration
January	Sānuali
February	Fēpueli
March	Maʻasi
April	ʻEpeleli
May	Mē
June	Sune
July	Siulai
August	ʻAokosi
September	Sēpitema
October	ʻOkatopa
November	Nōvema
December	Tisema

== Sample text ==
Article 1 of the Universal Declaration of Human Rights in Tongan:

Ko e kotoa ‘o ha’a tangata ‘oku fanau’i mai ‘oku tau’ataina pea tatau ‘i he ngeia mo e ngaahi totonu. Na’e fakanaunau’i kinautolu ‘aki ‘a e ‘atamai mo e konisenisi pea ‘oku totonu ke nau feohi ‘i he laumalie ‘o e nofo fakatautehina.

Article 1 of the Universal Declaration of Human Rights in English:

All human beings are born free and equal in dignity and rights. They are endowed with reason and conscience and should act towards one another in a spirit of brotherhood.

== Bibliography ==
- Churchward, C. Maxwell (1999) [1953, London: Oxford University Press; 1985, Tonga: Vavaʼu Press]. Tongan Grammar. Tonga: Vavaʼu Press. ISBN 982-213-007-4.
- Churchward, C.Maxwell (1999) [1959, London: Oxford University Press]. Tongan Dictionary: Tongan-English and English-Tongan. Tonga: Vavaʼu Press.
- Feldman, Harry (1978). "Some Notes on Tongan Phonology". Oceanic Linguistics. 17 (2): 133–139. doi:10.2307/3622908. JSTOR 3622908.
- Garellek, Marc; Tabain, Marija (2020). "Tongan". Illustrations of the IPA. Journal of the International Phonetic Association. 50 (3): 406–416. doi:10.1017/S0025100318000397, with supplementary sound recordings.
- Tuʻinukuafe, Edgar (1993). A Simplified Dictionary of Modern Tongan. Polynesian Press. ISBN 978-0908597093.
