= Polynesian languages =

Language family

Polynesian
- Geographic distribution: Polynesia
- Ethnicity: Polynesians
- Linguistic classification: Austronesian: Malayo-Polynesian; Oceanic; Central Pacific; East Central Pacific; Polynesian
- Proto-language: Proto-Polynesian
- Subdivisions: Tongic; Nuclear Polynesian

Language codes
- Glottolog: poly1242
- The Central Pacific languages Olive-green: East Fijian – Polynesian languages (not shown: Rapa Nui); Pink: Western Fijian – Rotuman languages

The Polynesian languages form a genealogical group of languages, itself part of the Oceanic branch of the Austronesian family.

There are 38 Polynesian languages, representing 7 percent of the 522 Oceanic languages, and 3 percent of the Austronesian family. While half of them are spoken in geographical Polynesia (the Polynesian triangle), the other half – known as Polynesian outliers – are spoken in other parts of the Pacific: from Micronesia to atolls scattered in Papua New Guinea, the Solomon Islands or Vanuatu. The most prominent Polynesian languages, by number of speakers, are Samoan, Tongan, Tahitian, Māori and Hawaiian.

The ancestors of modern Polynesians were Lapita navigators, who settled in the Tonga and Samoa areas about 3,000 years ago. Linguists and archaeologists estimate that this first population went through common development over approximately 1,000 years, giving rise to Proto-Polynesian, the linguistic ancestor of all modern Polynesian languages. After that period of shared development, the Proto-Polynesian society split into several descendant populations, as Polynesian navigators scattered around various archipelagoes across the Pacific – some travelling westwards to already populated areas, others navigating eastwards and settling in new territories (Society Islands, Marquesas, Hawaii, New Zealand, Rapa Nui, etc.).

Still today, Polynesian languages show strong similarity, particularly cognate words in their vocabulary; this includes culturally important words such as tapu, ariki, motu, fenua, kava, and tapa as well as Hawaiki (*sawaiki), the mythical homeland for some of the cultures.

== Internal classification ==
=== Phylogenetic classification ===
Polynesian languages fall into two branches, Tongic and Nuclear Polynesian. Tongan and Niuean constitute the Tongic branch; all the rest are part of the Nuclear Polynesian branch.

- Polynesian
  - Nuclear Polynesian
    - Ellicean
      - Ellicean–Outlier
        - Tuvaluan
        - Nukuoro (Nukuoro in the Federated States of Micronesia)
        - Kapingamarangi (on Kapingamarangi in Federated States of Micronesia)
        - Nukuria (Nuguria in eastern Papua New Guinea)
        - Takuu (Takuu Atoll in eastern Papua New Guinea)
        - Nukumanu (Nukumanu in the east of Papua New Guinea)
        - Ontong Java (or Luangiua; Ontong Java, Solomon Islands)
        - Sikaiana (Sikaiana, Solomon Islands)
        - Pileni (Reef Islands, Solomon Islands)
      - Samoic
        - Samoan
        - Tokelauan
    - Eastern Polynesian
      - Rapa Nui (Easter Island)
      - Central–Eastern Polynesian
        - Marquesic
          - Marquesan–Mangareva
            - Marquesan (Marquesas Islands and Puka-Puka, French Polynesia)
            - Mangareva (Gambier Islands, French Polynesia)
          - Hawaiian (Hawaii)
        - Tahitic
          - Tahitian (Society Islands, French Polynesia)
          - Austral (Austral Islands, French Polynesia)
          - Rapa (Rapa Iti, French Polynesia)
          - Tuamotuan (Tuamotu Archipelago, French Polynesia)
          - Greater Māori
            - Eastern Māori
              - Rarotongan (Cook Islands Māori, Cook Islands)
              - Rakahanga-Manihiki (Rakahanga and Manihiki, Northern Cook Islands)
              - Penrhyn (or Tongarevan; Tongareva, Northern Cook Islands)
            - Western Māori-Moriori
              - Māori (New Zealand)
              - Moriori (Chatham Islands, New Zealand) †
    - Futunic (?):
      - Wallisian or East Uvean (Fakaʻuvea) (Wallis Island, Wallis and Futuna)
      - Futunan or East Futunan (Fakafutuna) (Futuna Island, Wallis and Futuna)
      - West Uvean or Faga Uvea (Ouvéa off New Caledonia)
      - Pukapukan (Pukapuka, northern Cook Islands)
      - Anuta (Anuta Island, Solomon Islands)
      - Rennellese (Rennell and Bellona island, Solomon Islands)
      - Tikopia (Tikopia Island, Solomon Islands)
      - Vaeakau-Taumako (?) (Reef Islands and Taumako island, Solomon Islands)
      - Futuna-Aniwa or West Futunan (Futuna and Aniwa in Vanuatu)
      - Mele-Fila (Mele Island, Vanuatu)
      - Emae (Emae Island, Vanuatu)
  - Tongic
    - Tongan
    - Niuafoʻou (on Niuafoʻou Island, Tonga)
    - Niuean

=== History of classification ===
The contemporary classification of the Polynesian languages began with certain observations by Andrew Pawley in 1966 based on shared innovations in phonology, vocabulary and grammar showing that the East Polynesian languages were more closely related to Samoan than they were to Tongan, calling Tongan and its nearby relative Niuean "Tongic" and Samoan and all other Polynesian languages of the study "Nuclear Polynesian".

Previously, there had been lexicostatistical studies that squarely suggested a "West Polynesian" group composed of at least Tongan and Samoan and that an "East Polynesian" group was equally distant from both Tongan and Samoan.

Pawley published another study in 1967. It began the process of extracting relationships from Polynesian languages on small islands in Melanesia, the "Polynesian Outliers", whose languages Pawley was able to trace to East Futuna in the case of those farther south and perhaps to Samoa itself in the case of those more to the north.

Except for some minor differentiation of the East Polynesian tree, further study paused for almost twenty years until Wilson published a study of Polynesian pronominal systems in 1985 suggesting that there was a special relationship between the East Polynesian languages and all other Nuclear Polynesian but for Futunic, and calling that extra-Futunic group the "Ellicean languages". Furthermore, East Polynesian was found to more likely have emerged from extra-Samoan Ellicean than out of Samoa itself, in contradiction to the long assumption of a Samoan homeland for the origins of East Polynesian. Wilson named this new group "Ellicean" after the pre-independence name of Tuvalu and presented evidence for subgroups within that overarching category.

Marck, in 2000, was able to offer some support for some aspects of Wilson's suggestion through comparisons of shared sporadic (irregular, unexpected) sound changes, e. g., Proto-Polynesian and Proto-Nuclear-Polynesian *mafu 'to heal' becoming Proto-Ellicean *mafo. This was made possible by the massive Polynesian language comparative lexicon ("Pollex" – with reconstructions) of Biggs and Clark.

Comparisons of moon phase names in lunar calendars used by Hawaiians, the Māori, Tahitians, and Easter Islanders suggest an early split in Proto-East Polynesian of a proximal group that make up Hawaiian, Māori and Tahitian languages from a distal group that includes Marquesan and Rapa Nui.

=== Internal correspondences ===
Partly because Polynesian languages split from one another comparatively recently, and due also to extensive language contact across Polynesia for centuries, many words in these languages remain similar to corresponding words in others. The table below demonstrates this with the words for 'sky', 'north wind', 'woman', 'house' and 'parent' in a representative selection of languages: Tongan; Niuean; Samoan; Sikaiana; Takuu; North Marquesan; South Marquesan; Mangarevan; Hawaiian; Rapanui language; Tahitian; Māori and Cook Islands Māori (Rarotongan).

	Tongan	Niuean	Samoan	Sikaiana	Takuu	North Marquesan	South Marquesan	Mangarevan	Hawaiian	Rapanui	Tahitian	Māori	Rarotongan
sky	/laŋi/	/laŋi/	/laŋi/	/lani/	/ɾani/	/ʔaki/	/ʔani/	/ɾaŋi/	/lani/	/ɾaŋi/	/ɾaʔi/	/ɾaŋi/	/ɾaŋi/
north wind	/tokelau/	/tokelau/	/toʔelau/	/tokelau/	/tokoɾau/	/tokoʔau/	/tokoʔau/	/tokeɾau/	/koʔolau/	/tokeɾau/	/toʔeɾau/	/tokeɾau/	/tokeɾau/
woman	/fefine/	/fifine/	/fafine/	/hahine/	/ffine/	/vehine/	/vehine/	/veine/	/wahine/	/vahine/	/vahine/	/wahine/	/vaʔine/
house	/fale/	/fale/	/fale/	/hale/	/faɾe/	/haʔe/	/haʔe/	/faɾe/	/hale/	/haɾe/	/faɾe/	/ɸaɾe/	/ʔaɾe/
parent	/maːtuʔa/	/motua/	/matua/		/maatua/	/motua/	/motua/	/matua/	/makua/	/matuʔa/	/metua/	/matua/	/metua/

Certain regular correspondences can be noted between different Polynesian languages. For example, the Māori sounds /k/, /ɾ/, /t/, and /ŋ/ correspond to /ʔ/, /l/, /k/, and /n/ in Hawaiian. Accordingly, "person" is tangata in Māori and kanaka in Hawaiian, and Māori roa "long" corresponds to Hawaiian loa. The famous Hawaiian greeting aloha corresponds to Māori aroha, "love, tender emotion". Similarly, the Hawaiian word for kava is ʻawa.

Similarities in basic vocabulary may allow speakers from different island groups to achieve a significant degree of understanding of each other's speech. When a particular language shows unexpectedly large divergence in vocabulary, this may be the result of a name-avoidance taboo situation – see examples in Tahitian, where this has happened often.

European contact with Polynesians in the late 19th century gave birth to Maritime Polynesian Pidgin as a zonal auxiliary or trade medium based mainly on reductions of common characteristics between Tahitian, Māori and Hawaiian. Despite this, many Polynesian languages have been greatly affected by European colonization. Both Māori and Hawaiian, for example, have lost many speakers to English, and only since the 1990s have they resurged in popularity.

== Grammatical characteristics ==
=== Personal pronouns ===
In general, Polynesian languages have three numbers for pronouns and possessives: singular, dual and plural. For example, in Māori: ia (he/she), rāua (they two), rātou (they 3 or more). The words rua (2) and toru (3) are still discernible in endings of the dual and plural pronouns, giving the impression that the plural was originally a trial (threesome) or paucal (a few), and that an original plural has disappeared. Polynesian languages have four distinctions in pronouns and possessives: first exclusive, first inclusive, second and third. For example, in Māori, the plural pronouns are: mātou (we, exclusive), tātou (we, incl.), koutou (you), rātou (they). The difference between exclusive and inclusive is the treatment of the person addressed. Mātou refers to the speaker and others but not the person or persons spoken to (i.e., "I and some others, but not you"), while tātou refers to the speaker, the person or persons spoken to, and everyone else (i.e., "You and I and others").

=== a and o possession ===
Many Polynesian languages distinguish two possessives. The a-possessives (as they contain that letter in most cases), also known as subjective possessives, refer to possessions that must be acquired by one's own action (alienable possession). The o-possessives or objective possessives refer to possessions that are fixed to someone, unchangeable, and do not necessitate any action on one's part but upon which actions can still be performed by others (inalienable possession). Some words can take either form, often with a difference in meaning.

One example is the Samoan word susu, which takes the o-possessive in lona susu (her breast) and the a-possessive in lana susu (her breastmilk). Compare also the particles used in the names of two of the books of the Māori Bible: Te Pukapuka a Heremaia (The Book of Jeremiah) with Te Pukapuka o Hōhua (The Book of Joshua); the former belongs to Jeremiah in the sense that he was the author, but the Book of Joshua was written by someone else about Joshua. The distinction between one's birth village and one's village of current residence can be made similarly.

=== Numerals in Polynesian languages ===
Numerals:

English	one	two	three	four	five	six	seven	eight	nine	ten
Proto-Polynesian	*tasi	*rua	*tolu	*fa	*lima	*ono	*fitu	*walu	*hiwa	*haŋafulu
Tongan	taha	ua	tolu	fa	nima	ono	fitu	valu	hiva	hongofulu
Niuean	taha	ua	tolu	fā	lima	ono	fitu	valu	hiva	hogofulu
Samoan	tasi	lua	tolu	fa	lima	ono	fitu	valu	iva	sefulu
Tokelauan	tahi	lua	tolu	fa	lima	ono	fitu	valu	iva	hefulu
Tuvaluan	tasi	lua	tolu	fa	lima	ono	fitu	valu	iva	agafulu
Kapingamarangi	dahi	lua	dolu	haa	lima	ono	hidu	walu	hiwa	mada
Ontong Java	kahi	lua	kolu	hā	lima	oŋo	hiku	valu	sivo	sehui
Takuu	tasi	lua	toru	fa	rima	ono	fitu	varu	sivo	sinafuru
Pileni	tasi	rua	toru	fā	lima	ono	fitu	valu	iva	kʰaro
Sikaiana	tahi	lua	tolu	hā	lima	ono	hitu	valo	sivo	sehui
Marquesan	e tahi	e úa	e toú	e fa	e íma	e ono	e fitu	e vaú	e iva	ónohuú
Hawaiian	‘e-kahi	‘e-lua	‘e-kolu	‘e-hā	‘e-lima	‘e-ono	‘e-hiku	‘e-walu	‘e-iwa	‘umi (displaced anahulu)
Mangareva	tahi	rua	toru	ha	rima	ono	hitu	varu	iva	rogouru
Rapa Nui	tahi	rua	toru	ha	rima	ono	hitu	vaʼu	iva	ʼahuru
Māori	tahi	rua	toru	whā	rima	ono	whitu	waru	iwa	ngahuru (also: tekau)
Tahitian	tahi	rua (displaced by piti)	toru	maha	rima (displaced by pae)	ōno	hitu	vaʼu	iva	hōeʼahuru
Rarotongan	taʼi	rua	toru	ā	rima	ono	ʼitu	varu	iva	ngaʼuru
Tuamotuan	tahi	rua	toru	fā	rima	ono	hitu	varu	iva	gahuru
Penrhyn	tahi	lua	tolu	hā	lima	ono	hitu	valu	iva	tahi-ngahulu
Moriori	tehi	teru	toru	tewha	terima	teono	tewhitu	tewaru	teiwa	meangauru
Anuta	tai	rua	toru	paa	nima	ono	pitu	varu	iva	puangapuru
Emae	tasi	rua	toru	fa	rima	ono	fitu	βaru	siβa	ŋafuru
Futuna-Aniwa	tasi	rua	toru	fa	rima	ono	fitu	varo	iva	tagafuru
Mele	tasi	rua	toru	fa	rima	ono	fitu	βaru	siβa	siŋafuru
Nanumea	tahi	lua	tolu	fā	lima	ono	fitu	valu	iva	toa
Nukuoro	dahi	ka-lua	ka-dolu	ka-haa	ka-lima	ka-ono	ka-hidu	ka-valu	ka-siva	ka-hulu
Pukapuka	tayi	lua	tolu	wa	lima	ono	witu	valu	iva	laugaulu
Rennellese	tahi	ŋgua	toŋgu	hā	ŋgima	ono	hitu	baŋgu	iba	katoa
Tikopia	tasi	rua	toru	fa	rima	ono	fitu	varu	siva	fuaŋafuru
Wallisian	tahi	lua	tolu	fā	nima	ono	fitu	valu	hiva	hogofulu
West Uvea	tahi	ƚua	toƚu	fa	lima	tahia-tupu	luaona-tupu	toluona-tupu	faona-tupu	limaona-tupu

The words for 1,000 and 10,000 in these languages notably shifted between eastern and western branches: those in Tongic and Samoic groups used afe for 1,000 and mano for 10,000; while Tahitic and Marquesic languages like Tahitian, Māori and Hawaiian use mano and tini ~ kini, respectively.

== Orthography ==
Written Polynesian languages use orthography based on Latin script. Most Polynesian languages have five vowel qualities, corresponding roughly to those written i, e, a, o, u in classical Latin. However, orthographic conventions for phonemes that are not easily encoded in standard Latin script had to develop over time. Influenced by the traditions of orthographies of languages they were familiar with, the missionaries who first developed orthographies for unwritten Polynesian languages did not explicitly mark phonemic vowel length or the glottal stop. By the time that linguists trained in more modern methods made their way to the Pacific, at least for the major languages, the Bible was already printed according to the orthographic system developed by the missionaries, and the people had learned to read and write without marking vowel length or the glottal stop.

This situation persists in many languages. Despite efforts at reform by local academies, the general conservative resistance to orthographic change has led to varying results in Polynesian languages, and several writing variants co-exist. The most common method, however, uses a macron to indicate a long vowel, while a vowel without that diacritical mark is short, for example, ā versus a. Sometimes, a long vowel is instead written double, e.g. Maaori.

The glottal stop (not present in all Polynesian languages, but, where present, one of the most common consonants) is indicated by an apostrophe, for example, ⟨'a⟩ versus ⟨a⟩. Hawaiʻian uses the ʻokina, also called by several other names, a unicameral consonant letter used within the Latin script to mark the phonemic glottal stop. It is also used in many other Polynesian languages, each of which has its own name for the character. Apart from the ʻokina or the somewhat similar Tahitian ʻeta, a common method is to change the simple apostrophe for a curly one, taking a normal apostrophe for the elision and the inverted comma for the glottal stop. The latter method has come into common use in Polynesian languages.

The only polynesian language with a proper writing system was Rapa Nui with the Rongorongo script, which remains undeciphered today.

== See also ==
- Proto-Polynesian language – the reconstructed ancestral language from which modern Polynesian languages descend.
- ʻOkina – a glyph shaped like (but distinct from) an apostrophe, used to represent the glottal-stop consonant in some Polynesian Latin-based scripts.
- Rongorongo – the undeciphered script of Easter Island (Rapanui).
- List of English words of Polynesian origin

== Notes and references ==
=== Further reading ===
- Edward Tregear (1891). The Maori-Polynesian comparative dictionary. Lyon and Blair. pp. 675.
- Edward Tregear (1891). The Maori-Polynesian Comparative Dictionary. Lyon and Blair. at archive.org.
- Edward Tregear (1895). A Paumotuan dictionary with Polynesian comparatives. Whitcombe & Tombs Limited. pp. 76.

=== Bibliography ===
- Charpentier, Jean-Michel; François, Alexandre (2015). Atlas linguistique de Polynésie française – Linguistic Atlas of French Polynesia (in French and English). Mouton de Gruyter & Université de la Polynésie française. ISBN 978-3-11-026035-9.
- Irwin, Geoffrey (1992). The Prehistoric Exploration and Colonisation of the Pacific. Cambridge: Cambridge University Press.
- Krupa V. (1975–1982). Polynesian Languages, Routledge and Kegan Paul
- Lynch, John. (1998). Pacific Languages: an Introduction. University of Hawai'i Press.
- Lynch, John, Malcolm Ross & Terry Crowley (2002). The Oceanic languages. Richmond, Surrey: Curzon Press.
- Marck, Jeff (2000), Topics in Polynesian languages and culture history. Canberra: Pacific Linguistics.
- Silva, Diego B (2019). Language policy in Oceania. Alfa, Rev. Linguíst 63 (2).
