= Niuean language =

Polynesian language of Niue

Niuean
- ko e vagahau Niuē
- Native to: Niue; Cook Islands; New Zealand; Tonga
- Native speakers: 1,300 in Niue (2018); 4,600 in New Zealand (2013)
- Language family: Austronesian: Malayo-Polynesian; Oceanic; Polynesian; Tongic; Niuean
- Early forms: Proto-Austronesian: Proto-Malayo-Polynesian; Proto-Oceanic; Proto-Polynesian; Proto-Tongic; Old Niuean
- Standard forms: Standard Niuean
- Dialects: Niuean dialects
- Writing system: Latin

Official status
- Official language in: Niue

Language codes
- ISO 639-2: niu
- ISO 639-3: niu
- Glottolog: niue1239
- ELP: Niue
- Niuean is classified as Definitely Endangered by the UNESCO Atlas of the World's Languages in Danger.

Niuean (/njuˈeɪən/; ko e vagahau Niuē) is a Polynesian language, belonging to the Malayo-Polynesian subgroup of the Austronesian languages. It is most closely related to Tongan and slightly more distantly to other Polynesian languages such as Māori, Samoan and Hawaiian. Together, Tongan and Niuean form the Tongic subgroup of the Polynesian languages. Niuean also has a number of influences from Samoan and Eastern Polynesian languages.

== Speakers ==
Niuean was spoken by 1,600 people on Niue Island (97.4% of the inhabitants) in 1991, as well as by speakers in the Cook Islands, New Zealand, and Tonga, for a total of around 8,000 speakers. There are thus more speakers of Niuean outside the island itself than on the island. Most inhabitants of Niue are bilingual in English.

In the early 1990s, 70% of the speakers of Niuean lived in New Zealand. An annual Niuean Language Week is celebrated in New Zealand. The aim of the week is to celebrate Niuean language and culture.

== Dialects ==
Niuean consists of two main dialects, the older Motu dialect from the north of the island and the Tafiti dialect of the south. The words mean, respectively, the people of the island and the strangers (or people from a distance).

The differences between the dialects are mainly in vocabulary or in the form of some words.

Examples of differences in vocabulary are volu (Tafiti) vs matā (Motu) for scrape, scraper and lala (Tafiti) vs kautoga (Motu) for guava (plant); examples of differences in form include hafule (T) / afule (M), aloka/haloka, nai/nei, ikiiki/likiliki, and malona/maona.

== Phonology ==
	Labial	Alveolar	Velar	Glottal
Plosive	p	t	k	
Fricative	f v	(s)		h
Nasal	m	n	ŋ	
Liquid		l (r)		

[s] is an allophone of /t/ before front vowels (both long and short /i/ and /e/); this most likely arose from the affrication of /t/ to [ts] before these vowels and subsequent change of [ts] to [s]. While older foreign borrowings (such as tī from English 'tea') underwent this change along with (or perhaps by analogy with) native words, words borrowed into Niuean after this development retain the original [t] (for example, telefoni and tikulī from 'telephone' and 'degree').

/r/ and /s/ are marginal phonemes, only being used in foreign borrowings. Some speakers substitute [l] and [t], respectively.

=== Vowels ===
	front		central		back	
	short	long	short	long	short	long
high	i	iː			u	uː
mid	e	eː			o	oː
low			a	aː		

Vowel length is distinctive in Niuean; vowels are either long or short. Furthermore, two adjacent identical vowels (whether short-short, short-long, long-short, or long-long) form a rearticulated vowel; the sound is distinct from one long vowel.

Both short and long vowels can occur in any position.

All short vowels may combine with one another to form diphthongs. The possible diphthongs are outlined in the table below.

		First element				
		/a/	/e/	/i/	/o/	/u/
Second element
Second element	/a/	-	/ea/	/ia/	/oa/	/ua/
Second element	/e/	/ae/	-	/ie/	/oe/	/ue/
Second element	/i/	/ai/	/ei/	-	/oi/	/ui/
Second element	/o/	/ao/	/eo/	/io/	-	/uo/
Second element	/u/	/au/	/eu/	/iu/	/ou/	-

=== Hiatus ===
Hiatus is the separate pronunciation of two adjacent vowels, as opposed to diphthongs, which are written as two letters but pronounced as one sound. These two vowels may be the same or be different ones.

Hiatus typically occurs across morpheme boundaries, such as when a prefix ending with a vowel comes before a root beginning with that same vowel. It may also occur, rarely, within monomorphemic words (words that consist of only one morpheme) as a result of the elision of a historical intervocalic consonant.

Two adjacent identical short vowels are always pronounced separately, as are combinations of any two long vowels or a short and a long vowel; two adjacent different short vowels may undergo hiatus or form a diphthong. This must be determined from the morphology or etymology of the word.

=== Syllable structure ===
The basic structure of a Niuean syllable is (C)V(V); all syllables end in a vowel or diphthong, and may start with at most one consonant. Consonant clusters in borrowed words are broken up with epenthetic vowels, e.g. English 'tractor' becomes tuleketā.

=== Stress ===
The stress on a Niuean word is nearly always on the penult (second-to-last syllable), though multi-syllable words ending in a long vowel put primary stress on the final long vowel and secondary stress on the penult. Long vowels in other positions also attract a secondary stress.

=== Glottal stop ===
The Niuean language does not contain the glottal stop, which is present in its closest relative, Tongan. This has caused some distinct words to merge. For example, Tongan taʻu ('year') and tau ('fight') have merged in Niuean as tau ('year; fight').

== Orthography ==
Niuean orthography is largely phonemic; that is, one letter stands for one sound and vice versa.

=== Alphabet ===
The traditional alphabet order, given with the traditional names of the letters, is ā, ē, ī, ō, ū, fā, gā, hā, kā, lā, mō, nū, pī, tī, vī, rō, sā. Note that rō and sā as introduced letters are ordered at the end.

Sperlich (1997) uses an alphabetical order based on English for his dictionary: a, ā, e, ē, f, g, h, i, ī, k, l, m, n, o, ō, p, t, u, ū, v (r and s is left out since no words start with that letter). He recommends that consonants be named consistently with a following ā: fā, gā, hā, kā, lā, mā, nā, pā, tā, vā, rā, sā.

Vowel length can be marked with a macron; however, this is not always done.

=== History ===
As with many languages, writing was brought to Niue in connection with religion, in this case with Christianity by missionaries educated in Samoa. This has led to some Samoan influences in morphology and grammar and also to a noticeable one in spelling: as in Samoan, the sound /ŋ/ (Help:IPA) is written g, rather than ng as in Tongan and some other Polynesian languages with this sound. (McEwen uses ng in his dictionary; however, this feature of his spelling was not popular, particularly since it conflicted with the spelling used in the Niuean Bible.)

== Grammar ==
=== Typology ===
Niuean can be considered a VSO language; however, one analysis of Niuean uses ergative terminology, in which case it may be better to speak of verb–agent–patient word order.

Because the unmarked case is the absolutive, Niuean transitive verb constructions often appear passive in a literal translation.

Compare:

Kua kitia e ia e kalahimu
TAM see ERG he ART crab
"The crab was seen by him."

Kua kitia e kalahimu
TAM see ART crab
"The crab was seen."

The first example sentence could also be translated into English as the nominative–accusative construction "He saw the crab".

=== Pronouns ===
Niuean pronouns are differentiated by person and number. Furthermore, first person non-singular (dual and plural) pronouns distinguish inclusive and exclusive forms, including and excluding the listener, respectively. However, they are not differentiated by gender or case; for example, ia means both he and she, him and her (inanimates ['it'] are not usually pronominalised).

pronouns
		singular	dual	plural
1st person	inclusive	au	taua	tautolu
1st person	exclusive	au	maua	mautolu
2nd person		koe	mua	mutolu
3rd person		ia	laua	lautolu

Note that the endings of the dual and plural forms resemble the numbers 2 and 3, ua and tolu.

=== Numbers ===
Some numbers in Niuean are:

1	taha	10	hogofulu	100	taha e teau	1000	taha e afe
2	ua	20	uafulu	200	ua (e) teau	2000	ua (e) afe
3	tolu	30	tolugofulu	300	tolu (e) teau	3000	tolu (e) afe
4	fa*	40	fagofulu	etc.	etc.	etc.	etc.
5	lima	50	limagofulu				
6	ono	etc.	etc.				
7	fitu						
8	valu						
9	hiva						

(*Note: Both McEwen (1970) and Sperlich (1997) give fā for four; however, Kaulima & Beaumont (1994) give fa with a short vowel.)

Tens and ones combine with ma, e.g. hogofulu ma taha, 11; tolugofulu ma ono, 36.

The numbers from one to nine (and occasionally higher numbers) can take the prefix toko- when used to count persons; for example, tokolima five (for people).

Numbers are used as verbs, for example:

Ne taha e fufua moa i loto he kato.

Ne taha e fufua moa i loto he kato
PST one ART egg chicken LOC inside GEN basket
"There was one egg in the basket."; literally, "Was one an egg inside the basket."

or

Tolu e tama fuata ne oatu ke takafaga.

Tolu e tama fuata ne oatu ke takafaga
three ART child youth REL go GOAL hunt
"Three young men went out hunting."; literally, "Three (were) the young men who went out to hunt."

or

Ko e tau maaga ne fa.

Ko e tau maaga ne fa
PRED ART PL village REL four
"There were (are) four villages."; literally, "Were the villages, which were four."

=== Morphology ===
Morphology comprises the ways in which words are built up from smaller, meaningful sub-units, or how words change their form in certain circumstances.

==== Suppletion ====
Suppletion concerns closely related words (often singular and plural forms of nouns or verbs) which are based on very different forms, for example fano to go (used with a singular subject) and ō to go (used with a plural subject). This can be compared to English go and went, which are forms of the same verb yet differ in form.

==== Reduplication ====
Reduplication is frequently used in Niuean morphology to derive different nouns. Reduplication is the process of taking the entire morpheme, or sometimes only the first or last syllable or two, and repeating it.

This is used for several purposes, including:

- forming a "plural" verb from a "singular" one (that is, a verb form used when the subject is plural, as opposed to the form used when the subject is singular)
- forming a "frequentative" form of a verb (an action that is carried out several times)

An example of a whole-morpheme reduplication indicating a plural verb is molemole to have passed by, to be gone from mole to have passed by, to be gone; an example of a whole-morpheme reduplication indicating a frequentative verb is molomolo to keep squeezing from molo to squeeze, to compress.

Examples of part-morpheme reduplication are gagau to bite from gau to chew (first part of the syllable reduplicated), gegele to make a crying sound from gele to start to cry (of babies) (first syllable reduplicated), and molūlū to be very soft, to be very weak from molū to be soft, to be weak (last syllable reduplicated).

Reduplication is also frequently employed together with affixes.

==== Affixes ====
Affixes (prefixes and suffixes) are frequently used for a variety of purposes; there is also one circumfix, fe- -aki (sometimes fe- -naki or fe- -taki), which is used to form reciprocal verbs ("to ... one another").

A common suffix is -aga, which is a nominaliser: it forms nouns from verbs.

A common prefix with faka-, with a variety of meanings, the most common being a causative one (e.g. ako to learn, fakaako to teach).

Words may also have more than one prefix or suffix, as fakamalipilipi to break (used with a plural object), from faka-, ma-, and a reduplicated lipi to break.

==== Compound words ====
Many words are simply formed by joining together other words, for example vakalele aeroplane from vaka canoe and lele fly (i.e. literally, flying canoe). Diane Massam has extensively studied a special type of compounding which she has termed pseudo noun incorporation, a type of noun incorporation.

== Sample text ==
Article 1 of the Universal Declaration of Human Rights in Niuean:

Ko e tau tagata momoui oti kua fanau ai ke he fakatokanoaaga mo e fakatatai oti e tau tutuaga mo e tau tonuhia. Kua moua ai foki e lautolu e kakano mo e manamanatuaga ti kua lata ni ke fakafetui e taha ke he taha ke he agaga fakamatakainaga.

Article 1 of the Universal Declaration of Human Rights in English:

All human beings are born free and equal in dignity and rights. They are endowed with reason and conscience and should act towards one another in a spirit of brotherhood.
