= Anuta language =

Polynesian Outlier language

Coordinates: 11.61°S 169.85°E

Anuta
- Native to: Solomon Islands
- Region: Anuta Island
- Native speakers: (270 cited 1999)
- Language family: Austronesian: Malayo-Polynesian; Oceanic; Polynesian; Futunic; Anuta

Language codes
- ISO 639-3: aud
- Glottolog: anut1237
- ELP: Anuta

The Anuta language (or Anutan, locally te taranga paka-Anuta) is a Polynesian Outlier language from the island of Anuta in the Solomon Islands. It is closely related to the Tikopia language of the neighboring island of Tikopia, and it bears significant cultural influence from the island. The two languages have a high degree of mutual intelligibility, although Anutans can understand Tikopians better than the reverse.

Anuta is generally regarded as Nuclear Polynesian language, although it bears considerable Tongic influence.

In 1977, Richard Feinberg published a two-volume dictionary and basic grammar of the language.

== Phonology ==
Anuta has an extremely small consonant inventory. This is as a result of several phoneme mergers such as /f/ with /p/ and /s/ with /t/.

- fafine → papine (women, female)
- vasa → vata (open sea, ocean)
- lahi → rai (big)

The allophonic variation is one of the Tikopian influences.

Consonants
| | Labial | Alveolar | Velar |
|---|---|---|---|
| Nasal | m | n | ŋ |
| Plosive | p | t ~ s | k |
| Fricative | v ~ w | t ~ s | |
| Liquid | v ~ w | l ~ ɾ | |

Vowels have a short and long form. The length of a vowel makes a difference in phonetics and meaning in Polynesian languages, and may be written with vowel gemination ⟨aa⟩ or with a macron above ⟨ā⟩.

- matua (husband) vs. maatua (elderly person) vs. maatuaa (parent)
- taŋata (man) vs. taaŋata (men) vs. taŋaata (brother-in-law)

In other times, long vowels are to emphasis.

- maatea (great, extreme) → maaatea

Vowels
| | Front | Central | Back |
|---|---|---|---|
| Close | i | | u |
| Close-mid | e | | o |
| Open | | a | |

The stress in Anutan normally falls on the first syllable.

The ākamana Polynesian syllabary for Anutan appears like this:

| | a | e | i | o | u |
|---|---|---|---|---|---|
| a | ā | ē | ī | ō | ū |
| k | ka | ke | ki | ko | ku |
| m | ma | me | mi | mo | mu |
| n | na | ne | ni | no | nu |
| ŋ | ŋa | ŋe | ŋi | ŋo | ŋu |
| p | pa | pe | pi | po | pu |
| r | ra | re | ri | ro | ru |
| t | ta | te | ti | to | tu |
| v | va | ve | vi | vo | vu |

- ⟨ŋ⟩ may be substituted by either ⟨ng⟩ or ⟨g⟩ for typographical reasons.

== Morphology ==
Anuta shows many morphological similarities with Futunic languages and are related to Polynesian morphology.

== Grammar ==
Anuta follows the word order SVO. PVA (patient-verb-agent) ergative constructions are also common.

Anuta distinguishes personal pronouns into 1st, 2nd, and 3rd person and single, dual, and plural. Dual and plural 1st person are separated into exclusive and inclusive categories which depends on the words placement in the sentence.

2nd person pronouns should always be attached with either the particles ko, e, mo, or te.

When the pronoun is standing alone, usually in a response of a question, it is attached with the particle ko.

- Mea ko ai? ("who is it?")
- Ko au ("it is I")

Personal Pronouns
| | | singular | dual | plural |
|---|---|---|---|---|
| 1st person | exclusive | au, kau | maaua, ma | matou, matou |
| 1st person | inclusive | au, kau | taaua, ta | tatou, tou |
| 2nd person | | koe, ke | korua, koru | kotou, kotou |
| 3rd person | | ia, ei, na | naaua, na | natou, natou |

Similar to personal pronouns, possessive pronouns are divided into 1st, 2nd and 3rd person, single, dual and plural. Dual and plural also being separated into exclusive and inclusive. However, whether the object is singular or plural will change the singular form of the pronouns.

Possessive Pronouns
| | | singular | | dual | plural |
| | | singular object | plural object | dual | plural |
|---|---|---|---|---|---|
| 1st person | exclusive | toku, taku | oku, aku | ma, o maaua | matou, o matou |
| 1st person | inclusive | toku, taku | oku, aku | ta, o taaua | tatou, o tatou |
| 2nd person | | tou, tau | ou, au | koru, o korua | kotou, o kotou |
| 3rd person | | tona, tana, na | ona, ana | na, o naaua | natou, o natou |

Two ways of possessive construction. One, the possessive pronoun is directly attached to the object or two, directly attached to the dual or plural forms.

In singular possessive pronouns, when the object changes from singular to plural the /t/ drops.

- Toku taina ("my brother) → Oku taina ("my brothers")
- Tou topi ("your garden") → Ou topi ("your gardens")

=== Verbs ===
Any of the verbs in Anutan can be used as a noun by attaching "te".

Tense markers:

- infinitive = ke
- future = ka
- present = e
- past indicative = ne
- perfect = ku

These tense markers may be attached to verbs without personal pronouns. Usually placed between the noun and the verb.

If time is unimportant in the context of the sentence, tense markers will be dropped.

== Numerals ==
Numbers in Anuta are usually with tense markers.

Anutan use decimal counting systems. Tens use the same unit term pua making 'twenty' pua rua, 'thirty' pua toru and so forth. After tens, the number indicated in the tens are marked with maa meaning 'and'. Eleven would be puangapuru maa tai meaning 'ten and one'. The same goes for twenty's, thirty's, etc.

If the object of counting are humans the word toko will be placed in front of the number if it is enumerated.

- Te tangata e tai = One man
- Nga tangata e toko rua = two men

Counting fish would be marked with mata but is limited to ten or more.

- Te ika e matangapuru = Ten fish
- Te ika e mata nima maa iva = Fifty-nine fish

| Anuta | English |
|---|---|
| tai | one |
| rua | two |
| toru | three |
| pa | four |
| nima | five |
| ono | six |
| pitu | seven |
| varu | eight |
| iva | nine |
| puangapuru | ten |
| puangapuru maa tai | eleven |
| puangapuru maa rua | twelve |
| pua rua | twenty |
| pua toru | thirty |
| (e) pua te rau | hundred |
| (e) ape/te ape e tai | one thousand |
| (e) mano/te mano e tai | |

== Resources ==
A 200-word word list is available at the Austronesian Basic Vocabulary Database.
