= Futuna-Aniwa language =

Polynesian language spoken in Vanuatu

Futuna-Aniwa
- Region: Vanuatu
- Native speakers: (1,500 cited 2001)
- Language family: Austronesian: Malayo-Polynesian; Oceanic; Polynesian; Futunic; Futuna-Aniwa

Language codes
- ISO 639-3: fut
- Glottolog: futu1245

Futuna-Aniwa is a language spoken in the Tafea Province of Vanuatu, on the outlier islands of Futuna and Aniwa. The language has approximately 1,500 speakers. It is a Polynesian language, part of the Austronesian language family.

It is occasionally called West Futunan to distinguish it from East Futunan spoken on the islands of Futuna and Alofi in Wallis and Futuna.

== Phonology ==
The phonology of Futuna-Aniwa is mostly similar to the phonology of Polynesian. However, there are some elements that are not consistent between Futuna-Aniwa and Polynesian. For example, in Futuna-Aniwa both l and r are present, although Polynesian languages normally have one or the other. Similarly, another distinction can be made between /s/ and /ʃ/ in Futuna, and /s/ and /tʃ/ in Aniwa, which is also not normal in Polynesian.

Consonantal System
	Labial	Alveolar	Palatal	Velar	Glottal
Nasals	m ⟨m⟩	n ⟨n⟩		ŋ ⟨g⟩	
Plosives	p ⟨p⟩	t ⟨t⟩	(tʃ ⟨c⟩)	k ⟨k⟩	
Fricatives	f ⟨f⟩ β ⟨v⟩	s ⟨s⟩	ʃ ⟨j⟩		h ⟨h⟩
Rhotic		r ⟨r⟩			
Lateral		l ⟨l⟩			

- /p/ - Devoiced bilabial unaspirated plosive, initial and medial.
- /t/ - Denti-alveolar devoiced unaspirated plosive, initial and medial.
- /k/ - Devoiced velar unaspirated plosive, front and back varieties depending on neighbouring vowel but not differing phonemically; initial and medial.
- /m/ - Voiced bilabial nasal, initial and medial.
- /n/ - Voiced denti-alveolar nasal; initial and medial.
- /ŋ/ - Voiced velar nasal, initial and medial.
- /f/ - Voiceless bilabial fricative in both languages, but often occurring in Aniwa for Futuna v; initial and medial.
- /l/ - Voiced alveolar lateral, fricative, initial, medial.
- /r/ - Voiced lingual flapped alveolar consonant, sometimes practically fricative, without phonemic difference.
- /s/ - Voiceless alveolar sibilant, initial and medial.
- /ʃ/ - Voiceless palato-alveolar fricative with some lip-rounding. Futuna sound, to which /tʃ/ ⟨c⟩ corresponds in Aniwa; initial and medial.

Vowel System
	Front	Central	Back
High	i		u
Mid	e		o
Low		a	

- /i/ - High front unrounded vowel, of moderate tenseness, but relaxed (without lowering) if unstressed. Occurs in all positions.
- /e/ - Open mid front unrounded vowel, phonetically [ɛ] in all positions.
- /a/ - Low open vowel in all positions.
- /o/ - Open mid back rounded vowel, phonetically [ɔ], occurs in all positions.
- /u/ - High back rounded vowel, corresponding to /i/ as regards tenseness; all positions. Before and after vowels /i/ and /u/ become semivowels.

There are variations between Aniwa and Futuna. The most important and recognizable variation is the extreme palatalisation of dental consonants before front high and mid vowels, which also in some cases involves n-. An example of this is te/ti in Futuna, normally represented as ce/ci in Aniwa. There are, however, numerous other variations. Compared to Futuna, in Aniwa the velar plosive is backed more regularly, therefore k, q, and y is heard. This is shown most of the time, but there is a little freedom in variation. /k/ is retained before front vowels, word-initially, and before diphthongal clusters, /k/ becomes /q/ before /a/, and /k/ becomes /y/ before /o/. The rule itself first shows that there is consciousness of the word and not just the utterance and secondly, the exceptions may show native ideas of boundaries and junctures. noted by Capell notes, however, that the data collected from that particular village is not accurate or fully reliable.

== Morphology ==
=== Pronoun and person markers ===
Pronouns in Futuna-Aniwa distinguish for four numbers (singular, dual, trial and plural) and for first (inclusive and exclusive), second and third persons. The distinction of trial and plural in a Polynesian language is an unusual feature of Futuna-Aniwa.

There are primarily five different sets of pronominal forms in Futuna-Aniwa: personal, possessive, interrogative, emphatic, and demonstrative. In some circumstances, pronominal clitics will accompany these pronominal forms.

Pronouns are not inflected for gender, but can be marked for oblique case (marked by i) and, optionally, subjective case (marked by e).

==== Pronoun construction ====
Notably, pronouns in Futuna-Aniwa can all be easily divided into specific morphological components. For example, the second person nonsingular dual pronoun akorua is formed by combining the personal article prefix a-, the nonsingular, second person, pronominal focus infix –ko- and the dual suffix –(r)ua.

The only exceptions are interrogative pronouns, whose morphological construction is more complex and variable.

==== Personal pronouns ====
Personal pronouns are not obligatory in Futuna-Aniwa and may be omitted where context allows, as evident in example 1.

Unmarked Personal Pronouns
		Singular	Dual	Trial	Plural
1st person	inclusive	avau, au	akitaua	akitatou	akitea
1st person	exclusive	avau, au	akimaua	akimatou	akimea
2nd person		akoe	akorua	akoutou	akoua
3rd person		aia, eia	akiraua	akiratou	akirea

ka-i amkea sa-i tufa akoe
FUT.TNS-OBL {pick up} RES.TNS-OBL give you
'He'll pick it up and give it to you.'

==== Possessive pronouns ====
Pronouns in Futuna-Aniwa can be used to indicate inalienable possession, exclusively for singular persons. These appear immediately before an inalienable head noun.

Inalienable Possessive Pronouns
Person	Singular	Dual	Trial	Plural
1st person singular	tuku	ruoku	takoku	oku
2nd person singular	tou	ruou	takou	ou
3rd person singular	tano, tan	ruano	takano	ano

ruoku vae ma oku rima
1.DU.POSS leg CONJ 1.PL.POSS arm
'My two legs and my hands.'

There is also an equivalent “paradigm of personal pronoun suffixes” that occur in possessive constructions, suffixing onto nouns to indicate possession. Note that example (3) below can also be expressed using the above equivalent inalienable possessive pronouns.

Personal Pronoun Possessive Suffixes
		Singular	Dual	Trial	Plural
1st person	inclusive	-ku	-taua	-tatou	-tea
1st person	exclusive	-ku	-maua	-matou	-mea
2nd person		-u	-rua	-utou	-ua
3rd person		-na, -no	-raua	-ratou	-rea

tojina-ku
Uncle-1SG.POSS
'My uncle.'

==== Interrogative pronouns ====
There are 14 different interrogative pronoun forms in Futuna-Aniwa. Minimally, Futuna-Aniwa distinguishes between singular and nonsingular in all interrogative pronoun constructions. Nonsingular interrogative pronouns appear in dual, trial and plural positions.

Interrogative Pronouns
Interrogative Pronoun	English Translation	Notes
akai	who	Singular
akaima	who	Nonsingular
akai, okai	whose	Singular
akaima, okaima	whose	Nonsingular
taha	what	Singular, specific
aha	what	Nonsingular, specific
saha	what	Nonspecific
jiaha	what	Diminutive
tefe, tehe	which	Singular
efe, ehe	which	Nonsingular

ta fare okai
ART house whose
'Whose house is this?'

ta fare tehe
ART house which
'Which house?'

==== Emphatic pronouns ====
Emphatic pronouns in Futuna-Aniwa are used to indicate that the designated referent in a clause is the only referent being referred to.

Emphatic Pronouns
		Singular	Dual	Trial	Plural
1st person	inclusive	sokovau	sokitaua	sokitatou	sokitea
1st person	exclusive	sokovau	sokimaua	sokimatou	sokimea
2nd person		sokoe	sokorua	sokoutou	sokoua
3rd person		sokoia	sokiraua	sokiratou	sokirea

u aia no-nofo sokoia
CONJ 3SG PRES.PROG.TNS-stay 3SG.EMP
‘And so he lives all by himself.’

==== Demonstrative pronouns ====
Demonstrative pronouns in Futuna-Aniwa distinguish three positions: position near speaker, position near addressee and distant position. They are, in essence, a grouping of the base demonstrative form and the Futuna-Aniwa article system. This is further explained in the Demonstratives section below.

Demonstrative Pronouns
Position	Singular	Dual	Trial	Plural
Near Speaker	te nei	ru nei	taka nei	e nei, a ganei
Near Addressee	te na	ru na	taka na	e na, a gana
Distant	te ra	ru ra	taka ra	e ra, a gara

a tiauau {te ra}
ART Chauau that
‘That is Chauau.’

==== Pronominal clitics ====
Within certain constructions in Futuna-Aniwa, pronominal clitics occur alongside pronouns. Pronominal clitics only occur with singular persons and serve the role of cross referencing the subject of a verb. The pronominal clitic is typically suffixed onto tense or aspect markers, negatives in preverbal position or the infinitive.

Pronominal clitics primarily occur within transitive constructions in Futuna-Aniwa, although not exclusively. This is evident through comparing example (8) (a transitive construction) with example (9) (an intransitive construction) below. The pronominal clitic is not present in (9), but is suffixed onto the preverbal negative particle in (8).

(avau) se-n tahtaroa ma sa kapiti
1SG NEG.PART-PRO.CLI wash NEG.PART ART cabbage
‘I didn't wash the cabbage.’

Note: In (8), the first personal singular was omitted from the original example. It has been included for clarity.

avau ka muri
1SG FUT.TNS follow
'I'll follow.'

=== Demonstratives ===
Demonstratives in Futuna-Aniwa distinguish by location, with three categories for relative distance: close to the speaker, close to the addressee, and far away from both.

In natural speech, the distinction between what is close to the listener and what is far away can sometimes be lost, and the respective demonstrative for each can be used somewhat interchangeably in conversational settings. Most constructions in Futuna-Aniwa use a set of three demonstratives: nei, indicating position near the speaker, na, indicating position near the addressee, and ra, indicating distant position.

These demonstratives can be traced back to Proto-Oceanic *ne, *ta and *wa.. Proto-Polynesian has *eni ('this, these'), which has the reflex *teenei ('this') and *(ee)nei ('these') in Proto-Nuclear-Polynesian. This implies an evolution from *ne in Proto-Oceanic, to *eni in Proto-Polynesian, to *teenei and *(ee)nei in PNP, which then became *nei in Futuna-Aniwa. However, Proto-Polynesian also has the marker *ni, referring to location close to the speaker in either time or space; in Proto-Nuclear-Polynesian, this became *nei. Dougherty lists both of these as origins of Futuna-Aniwa *nei. Their lexical similarity in meaning complements this understanding.

==== Articles ====
Demonstratives in Futuna-Aniwa are closely connected to the article system, as noted above in the Pronouns section. Most uses of the demonstratives in the language follow an article, typically used as optional clarifiers for the articles. While articles in Futuna-Aniwa typically go before the noun they modify, articles can also occur after the noun so that they occur before a demonstrative. In this way, Futuna-Aniwa's demonstratives follow the nouns they modify, as is typical of most Austronesian languages, particularly in the Vanuatu region, according to the World Atlas of Language Structures.

a fare okai e na?
ART.PL house whose ART.PL these
'Whose houses are these?'

As the specific articles of the language distinguish by number, articles and demonstratives paired together to give the following table, as noted in the Pronouns section:

Demonstrative Pronouns
Position	Singular	Dual	Trial	Plural
Near Speaker	te nei	ru nei	taka nei	e nei, a ganei
Near Addressee	te na	ru na	taka na	e na, a gana
Distant	te ra	ru ra	taka ra	e ra, a gara

In the above table, the sounds written correspond to the phonology of Futuna. In Aniwa, the singular would be ce nei, ce na, and ce ra respectively. The singular article in the above table could also be replaced with the singular diminutive ji article, changing in meaning from 'this thing' to 'this little thing'.

The article te here is one of the three forms of the definite article. Typically, the definite article is ta; however, ti is used for a restricted set of words, typically words beginning with a stressed vowel a. Te is the last form of the article and is typically restricted to a set of words that often, but not always, begins with a vowel. When combined with the article te, this vowel can sometimes be deleted.

Te can, however, be used as a demonstrative on its own. It is the only article with which this can occur. In this case, te comes after the noun, which is typical of demonstratives but untypical of articles. It is used in this manner as an emphatic article.

tou pua te!
your.GEN back this
'This is your back!'

According to Dougherty, pe can also be used in the article position to specify an unmentioned referent. It is often used when making an example, not dissimilar to English like in a phrase like that or like this.

tane ka penage ana pe ra
he will.FUT behave just like that
'He will behave just like that.'

The three key demonstratives can also be used in adjectival phrases, typically after the noun, although occasionally before; it is in these places that they are not bound to the article, whereas usually they would need an article of some kind.

a toro ne
ART.PL sugarcane this
'this sugarcane'

==== Locative constructions ====
Demonstratives in Futuna-Aniwa can occur in locative constructions. The constructions use either i, denoting static position, or ki, denoting a motion towards the indicated position, followed by a person marker- either ku first person, or ko non-first person, followed by the relevant demonstrative. In first-person, the demonstrative can be omitted. For example, ikunei indicates a static position, with the first-person marker and the demonstrative indicating near the speaker, meaning ‘here, in this position’; kikora indicates movement (rather than a static position), the non-first person marker, and a distant position, meaning ‘towards there (that distant location)’. In designating position near the speaker, the final element nei is optional

Demonstratives with i and ki
Position	Static	Moving ('toward')
Near Speaker	ikunei, iku	kikunei, kiku
Near Addressee	ikona	kikona
Distant	ikora	kikora
