= Emae language =

Polynesian language spoken in Vanuatu

Emae
- Fakamae
- Native to: Vanuatu
- Region: Emae
- Native speakers: (400 cited 2001)
- Language family: Austronesian: Malayo-Polynesian; Oceanic; Polynesian; Futunic?; Emae

Language codes
- ISO 639-3: mmw
- Glottolog: emae1237
- ELP: Emae
- Emae is classified as Vulnerable by the UNESCO Atlas of the World's Languages in Danger.

Emae, Emwae or Mae (endonym: Fakamwae or Fakaɱae), is a Polynesian outlier language of Vanuatu.

== Population ==
The language of Emae is spoken in the villages of Makatea and Tongamea on Emae in the country of Vanuatu. Most of the Emae people speak Emae, North Efate (Nguna), English, French and Bislama.

Less than 1% of the people who speak Emae as their native language are literate in the language, while 50–70% are literate in their second language, whether it be Nguna, English, French or Bislama. Today, only around 400 people speak Emae, mainly in Makatea and Tongamea, 250 more than in the 1960s—around 150 speakers. According to Lewis, Emae is still underused by many of the people in the area, but 50% of children know and speak Emae (2014), and children speaking Emae will help the language thrive.

== Classification ==
Emae belongs to the large group of Austronesian language, which contains more than 1200 languages. Emae is part of the Samoic-Outliers node also known as Polynesian Outliers.

Emae is part of the Futunic group and all nine languages part of this node are the immediate sister languages of Emae. The Futunic group comes from languages linked to the island of Futuna.

== Phonology ==
=== Consonants ===
		Labial	Alveolar	Velar
Nasal		m ~ mʷ	n	ŋ
Plosive	plain	p	t	k
Plosive	prenasal	ᵐb	ⁿd	
Fricative	voiceless	f	s	
Fricative	voiced	v		
Trill			r	
Approximant			l	

According to Capell (1962), "[h] appears, but is a variant of [f] and sometimes [s]. Not classified as phoneme." /m/ may occasionally also be labialized as [mʷ].

=== Vowels ===
Emae is typologically unusual in that the historical back vowels *u and *o are no longer distinguished from *i and *e by being back vowels, but only in being rounded. They do still occur as back vowels, but they are variable, and more often are front vowels, sometimes more front than /i/ and /e/. This asymmetrical distribution is not found in neighboring languages. The round vowels, now /ø/ and /œ/, overlap and may be in the process of merging.

	Front		Central	Back
Close	i			u
Mid	e	ø		o
Mid		œ		
Open			ɐ	

=== Syllable structure and stress ===
The syllabic pattern of Emae is (C)V—that is, either V or CV. Such a pattern of open syllables is common in the world, particularly in Polynesian languages. As a corollary, the language does not have any consonant clusters; the complex segments [mb], [nd] and [mw] are single phonemes, with [mb] and [nd] forming prenasalized consonants.

Stress is usually placed on the antepenultimate syllable: e.g., nanafi 'yesterday', stressed on the first syllable.

== Grammar ==
=== Basic word order ===
Capell says the syntactic pattern of Emae is Melanesian, and can be shown by the comparison between the sentence pattern of Maori and Emae.

The pattern that Maori, a Polynesian language, follows is the VSO. Capell puts the structures in term of actor, predicate and goal. The actor is the subject, the predicate the verb phrase and the goal is the object of the sentence. Emae follows the SVO pattern, which is the structure that most Melanesian languages use.

=== Reduplication ===
Reduplication in Emae is not as common as it is in other Polynesian languages. Most of the reduplication in Emae is a loan from other languages located around Emae. In Capell’s book, he states that there is presence of both noun and verb reduplication in Emae.

Noun Reduplication

- tui – "needle"
- tuitui – "sew"

Verb Reduplication (Loan from Nguna)

- lae – "rejoice"
- laelaea – "rejoicing"

== Vocabulary ==
=== Indigenous vocabulary ===
Most words in the Emae language are general Polynesian words:

- afi – "fire"
- ariki – "chief
- boŋiboŋi – "tomorrow"
- fafine – "female"
- fare – "house"
- po:ki – "to beg; beseech"
- roto – "inside 'heart'"

=== Homophones ===
The homophones are regarded as interesting in Emae because, some of the time, one word is a general Polynesian word yet the other comes from another Pacific language. GP=General Polynesian

- ara
1. GP "road, path"
2. GP "wake up"
- fia
1. GP "how many?"
2. GP "desire; want"
- fua
1. Maori "to give"
2. GP "egg"
- po
1. Nguna "then; and then"
2. GP "night"
- rima
1. GP "hand"
2. GP "five"

== Endangerment ==
When trying to classify a language as endangered, linguists have to take into account other aspects of the language’s uses in the area it is spoken. The use of the language in the daily life of the Emae people is an important piece of information in determining Emae's level of endangerment. According to Lewis, Emae is used in most domains (2014), yet this is a very vague statement because it does not specify the domains it refers to. This information can cause skeptics to have a different point of view. One domain in which a language might be used is at a religious gathering. While use in religious ceremony can be a way to preserve a language, there is no documentation of the Emae people using their language in this type of domain. For example in one of the villages, "Makata" or "Natanga", the title of the hymnals was in Tongoan.

Tongoan is small language no longer spoken on Emae located on the island of Tongoa. The second source came from a YouTube video of a VHS recording of a small congregation of Emae people singing a gospel song. Instead of using Emae the people were singing in Bislama, one of the official languages of Vanuatu. This presents another issue with the lack of documentation of Emae, as there are no audio recordings of the language. There is a small elementary school located in Emae called "Nofo" School, but it is unlikely that the language is taught there, as it is more popular to learn one of three official languages, which are spoken in the college on Efate.

The use of official languages over indigenous languages and the lack of documentation of Emae are contributing factors to the endangered state of the language. There isn’t any sign that Emae people have kept up with modern technology, or even radios, which would be a perfect domain to help the language spread and survive.

Inter-generational transfer, or the transferring of a language to a younger generation, is also a predictor of a language's vitality. According to Lewis, the language is used by 50% of the children (2014), which is a positive sign for the language, as the children will help keep the language alive. In Capell’s book, Reverend Herwell says that, "The population figures for [Makata and Natanga] are together now 157.”

With about 400–500 speakers recorded in 2001, the total number of Emae speakers more than doubled in over forty years, which supports that children of Emae have and still are learning the language, keeping Emae alive.
