= Niuafoʻou language =

Language of Tonga's northernmost island

Niuafoʻou
- Ko te lea faka Niuafoʻou
- Native to: Tonga
- Native speakers: 1,000
- Language family: Austronesian: Malayo-Polynesian; Oceanic; Polynesian; Tongic?; Niuafoʻou

Language codes
- ISO 639-3: num
- Glottolog: niua1240
- Niuafoʻou is not endangered according to the classification system of the UNESCO Atlas of the World's Languages in Danger

A speaker of Niuafoʻou

Niuafoʻou, or Niuafoʻouan, is the language spoken on Tonga's northernmost island, Niuafoʻou.

Niuafoʻouan has traditionally been classified as closest to ʻUvean and Tokelauan, in an East Uvean–Niuafoʻou branch. However, recent research suggests that it is closest to its neighbour, Tongan, as one of the Tongic languages. Niuafoʻou is partly mutually intelligible with Tongan. Information is scarce about the language, with little published sources available.

== Phonology ==
The phonology of Niuafoʻou is similar to that of Tongan, with twelve consonants and five vowel phonemes.

Consonants
	Labial	Alveolar	Velar	Glottal
Nasal	m	n	ŋ	
Plosive	p	t	k	ʔ
Fricative	f v	s		h
Lateral		l		

Vowels
	Front	Central	Back
High	i		u
Mid	e		o
Low		a	

Vowels are more centralized when unstressed. /i/ and /u/ are de-voiced under some conditions.

Sometimes the phoneme /t/ is realized as a apico-alveolar flap (/ɾ/). /h/ is only realized as /h/ at the beginning of words. In the middle of words, it is either /ɦ/ or /x/.

=== Syllable structure ===
Niuafoʻou has a very simple syllable structure, (C)V. However, it is apparently transitioning towards allowing consonant clusters, due to the influence of foreign languages and the de-voicing of vowels.

== Status ==
In a 1980 article in The Journal of the Polynesian Society, T. S. Dye states that speakers of Niuafoʻou are bilingual and able to speak Tongan easily. Dye remarked that the increasing influence of the Tongan language, specifically with children learning it at schools, would mean that the language of Niuafoʻou would eventually become Tongan.

In September 2022 language campaigners called for it to be taught in primary schools on Niuafo’ou. Per Ethnologue, the Niuafoʻou language is not known to be taught in schools. Ethnologue considers Niuafoʻou to be an endangered language.
