= Tongic languages =

Group of Polynesian languages

Tongic
- Geographic distribution: Tonga and Niue
- Linguistic classification: Austronesian: Malayo-Polynesian; Oceanic; Central Pacific; Polynesian; Tongic
- Proto-language: Proto-Tongic
- Subdivisions: Tongan; Niuean

Language codes
- Glottolog: tong1324

The Tongic languages are a small group of Polynesian languages, which consists of at least two languages, Tongan and Niuean, and possibly a third, Niuafoʻouan.

== See also ==
- Tonga
- Niue
- Niuafo'ou
