= Kapingamarangi language =

Polynesian language

Kapingamarangi
- Kirinit
- Native to: Micronesia
- Region: Kapingamarangi and Pohnpei islands
- Native speakers: (3,000 cited 1995)
- Language family: Austronesian: Malayo-Polynesian; Oceanic; Polynesian; Ellicean; Kapingamarangi

Language codes
- ISO 639-3: kpg
- Glottolog: kapi1249
- ELP: Kapingamarangi
- Kapingamarangi is classified as Severely Endangered by the UNESCO Atlas of the World's Languages in Danger.

Kapingamarangi is a Polynesian language spoken in the Federated States of Micronesia. It had 3,000 native speakers in 1995. The language is closely related to the Nukuoro language.

== Introduction ==
=== History ===
The Kapingamarangi language is a language spoken primarily on the Kapingamarangi atoll, within the Federated States of Micronesia. People from Kapingamarangi have also settled on other islands in the South Pacific Ocean, such as Nukuoro, Pohnpei, and Palau, bringing the language with them. A small number of Kapingamarangi speakers have immigrated outside of Micronesia as well.

Kapingamarangi was not written until the 20th century, first using Japanese characters. This system was introduced by a Japanese immigrant, but was not broadly adopted. Sometime after 1917, a missionary from Nukuoro introduced the Nukuoro writing system (based on the Latin alphabet) and this was more broadly adopted. The writing system was idiosyncratically adapted to Kapingamarangi, however, leading to a range of similar but not identical writing systems. Beginning in the 1970s, the writing system began to be standardized.

=== Population ===
Kapingamarangi currently has three thousand total speakers: one thousand speakers on the atoll of Kapingamarangi and two thousand speakers in Pohnrakied village on Pohnpei. The people of Kapingamarangi are considered by Lieber and Dikepa to be of Polynesian ethnicity; the other seven states of the Federated States of Micronesia are categorized as being Micronesian. The language status of Kapingamarangi is "educational", which means that the language is in vigorous use, maintaining standardization and literature throughout a widespread system in institutions of education. The language has been developed to a point that it is used and sustained in people's homes and around the community.

== Alphabet ==
A, B, D, E, G, H, I, K, L, M, N, Ng, O, P, T, U, W

Long vowels are written with double vowels. The Lieber-Dikepa lexicon also uses double consonants to represent the aspirated consonants in certain cases, namely nasals (where doubled ng is nng), w, h, and l.

== Phonology ==
=== Consonants ===
Kapingamarangi has 18 consonants: /p/, /pʰ/, /t/, /tʰ/, /k/, /kʰ/, /w/, /wʰ/, /h/, /hː/, /m/, /mʰ/, /n/, /nʰ/, /ŋ/, /ŋʰ/, /ɺ/, and /ɺʰ/.

Kapingamarangi consonants
		Labial	Coronal	Dorsal/ Laryngeal
Nasal	plain	m	n	ŋ
Nasal	aspirated	mʰ	nʰ	ŋʰ
Plosive	plain	p	t	k
Plosive	aspirated	pʰ	tʰ	kʰ
Fricative	short			h
Fricative	long			hː
Approximant/ Flap	plain	w	ɺ	
Approximant/ Flap	aspirated	wʰ	ɺʰ	

=== Vowels ===
Kapingamarangi has ten vowels.

Vowels
	Front	Central	Back
Close	i iː		u uː
Mid	e eː		o oː
Open		a aː	

Lieber and Dikepa write the long vowels as ⟨aa⟩, ⟨ee⟩, ⟨ii⟩, ⟨oo⟩, and ⟨uu⟩. For example, duli 'bird' contrasts with dulii 'small' or 'little'.

Kapingamarangi vowel phonemes have diphthongs because in Kapingamarangi language, it is possible to have any two vowels next to each other. For example, the word eidu 'spirit, ghost, monster' has a diphthong with the letters /e/ and /i/.

=== Syllable structure ===
The syllable structure of the Kapingamarangi language is VV, VVV, VCV, CVV, CCVV, CVCV, and CCVCV. In Kapingamarangi, like most Polynesian languages, it is impossible for a word to end in a consonant, but it is possible for there to be two consonants together, as long as it is the same letter.

Example: The term for un-groomed hair is libgo wwana. In this term, the two (W's) stand together in the word wwana.

== Grammar ==
=== Basic word order ===
There are three possible word orders in the Kapingamarangi language. The word order of Kapingamarangi is SVO (subject–verb–object), VSO (Verb Subject Object), or OSV (Object Verb Subject). SVO is the commonly used word order, followed by VSO, and finally OSV is the least used and is a very case in the language. The word order for questions is the same as they are for statements. In research for the grammar of Kapingamarangi, deciphering reasoning or specific uses for the alternative word orders are unsure.

ex. Mee gu noho I dono hale. He is staying at the house.

=== Morphology ===
Morphology is another pivotal element to understanding the grammar of Kapingamarangi. Morphology is the descriptive analysis of words. The morphology of Kapingamarangi is extremely extensive. The word classes in Kapingamarangi are pronouns, possessives, demonstratives, verbs, nouns, adverbs, adjectives, negatives, particles, conjunctions, and interjections.

Many verbs can take a prefix, but even more verbs take a suffix. For example, a verb may have a prefix like haka- before a word, and a suffix like –ina after a word. Like the French language, adjectives follow nouns; and adverbs follow verbs, adjectives, and/or demonstratives. Negatives in Kapingamarangi immediately precede verbs or verb particles. Conjunctions mark serial relationships, and interjections denote emotion.

The pronouns in Kapingamarangi can be dual (two people), plural (more than two people), inclusive (including the addressee), or exclusive (excluding the addressee). Serial relationships are expressed by the pronoun mo, which means "and". For example, "David and I" would be, "Kimaua mo David". The pronouns in the Kapingamarangi language are very different from the pronouns in the English language. The pronouns in Kapingamarangi are not gender specific. For example, Kinae means "him or her"; therefore the gender must be translated through the context of a sentence or conversation.

=== Reduplication ===
Reduplication is a common concept that appears in the Kapingamarangi language, and is relevant to understanding the grammar of Kapingamarangi. Reduplication is the repetition of a root word. The reduplication of Kapingamarangi can be achieved in two different fashions: partial and full reduplication. The fully reduplicated form is generated by the full repetition of the base form, while partial reduplication is generated by partial repetition of the base form. Reduplication usually depicts continued or repeated action. For example, tapa is a single flash of lightning, while tapatapa is repeated flashing. In Kapingamarangi, reduplication can be done with the first two syllables, or it can be done with the final two syllables. There is only one word in the lexicon of Kapingamarangi that displays a partially reduplicated form; the word baba is the only word that is partially reduplicated, and it reduplicates to the word babaa.

Examples:

- Tapa – single flash of lightning
  - Tapatapa – repeated flashing
- Uii – pick fruit
  - Uuii – pick a bunch of fruits
- Waa – roar
  - Waawaa – repeated roaring
- Mahi – strength, power, energy
  - Mahimahi – hard to pull out

== Endangerment ==
=== Materials ===
The Kapingamarangi language has access to an online English-to-Kapingamarangi talking dictionary.

A Kapingamarangi lexicon has been published by Michael D. Lieber and Kalio H. Dikepa.

Dictionaries, linguistics books, and books about the atoll are available for Kapingamarangi. Many native speakers were involved in the translation project that resulted in the Kapingamarangi Bible. Websites like Facebook and YouTube also contain information on Kapingamarangi. The Facebook page is a Micronesia Language Revitalization Workshop page and it contains information about a workshop that was held all throughout Micronesia, including Kapingamarangi. There is a YouTube video of an interview with a speaker who is bilingual in both English and Kapinga and he explains the importance of speaking Kapingamarangi and language revitalization. There are also selections of poetry in Kapingamarangi.

=== Intergenerational transmission ===
It is likely that Kapingamarangi is being transmitted to children, because attempts to revitalize Kapingamarangi are being carried out, and the number of speakers keeps increasing. Since the language is taught in schools, it can be assumed that language is being passed down to the next generation. Since Kapingamarangi has so many resources for people to go to, children have access to a variety of resources to assist their education of the language. Kapingamarangi is not endangered; however, it is threatened. The language is taught in schools and churches, but is not used in all domains. According to Ethnologue, Kapingamarangi is taught in primary schools. It is also used at home, in the community, and in churches. The language is at a current growing state, and might become a fully revitalized language in the near future.

== See also ==
- Nukuoro language
- Polynesian outlier
- Polynesian languages
- Tokelauan language

== Bibliography ==
- Anderson, Gregory D.S.; Harrison, K. David (2013). "Kapingamarangi Talking Dictionary". Living Tongues Institute for Endangered Languages.
- Elbert, S. (1946). Kapingamarangi and Nukuoro Word List, With Notes on Linguistic Position, Pronunciation, and Grammar. United States Military Government.
- Lewis, M. Paul; Simons, Gary F.; Fennig, Charles D., eds. (2013). Ethnologue: Languages of the World (17th ed.). Dallas, Texas: SIL International.
- Lieber, Michael D.; Dikepa, Kalio H. (1974). Kapingamarangi Lexicon. Honolulu: University Press of Hawaii. hdl:10125/62886. ISBN 978-0-8248-8132-0. JSTOR j.ctv9zckhc. OCLC 573302165.
