= Rennellese language =

Polynesian language of the Solomon Islands

Rennellese
- Rennell-Bellona
- Te hegeunga a Mugaba ma Mugiki
- Native to: Solomon Islands
- Native speakers: (4,400 cited 1999)
- Language family: Austronesian: Malayo-Polynesian; Oceanic; Polynesian; Rennellese
- Dialects: Munggava (Mugaba, Rennell); Mungiki (Mugiki, Bellona)

Language codes
- ISO 639-3: mnv
- Glottolog: renn1242

Rennell-Bellona, or Rennellese, is a Polynesian outlier language spoken in the Rennell and Bellona Province of Solomon Islands. A dictionary of the language has been published.

== Introduction ==
=== History ===
Rennellese, also known as Rennell or Bellonese, is a Polynesian language (considered one of the Polynesian outliers, since it lies outside of the Polynesian Triangle) that is spoken in the Central Solomon Islands; mainly Rennell and Bellona island. For a great deal of time the Solomon Islands were occupied by the British, and pidgin English had become the main language spoken in the Rennell and Bellona Islands, until World War II. At that time the Rennell and Bellona Islands were a battlefield during the Battle of Midway, between the Japanese and Americans; just like Hawaii. During the battle the Japanese occupied most of the area using it as a base. After World War II had ended, both Rennell and Bellona were still being held by allied forces, until finally gaining independence in 1978. Both islands have been working to develop their own government, and Rennellese has been recognized as the official language.

=== Population ===
The Solomon Islands have a population of around 940,000 (in 2016), including 658,000 in the independent state of the Solomon Islands; and only a little over 4000 of these people speak Rennellese. Natives who currently live there refer to themselves as Mungiki for the Bellona Islands and Mugaba for the Rennell Islands, and among the younger generation Avaiki is used to reference both. Ethnic groups in these islands are very widespread and distinct. The people of the Rennell and Bellona Islands live in small village communities, with each group having its own culture, and religious practices. As for government issues, the Solomon Islands as a whole is divided, with the islands to the northwest (primarily Bougainville and Buka) belonging to Papua New Guinea, while the rest of the Solomons are their own independent government. The Rennell and Bellona Islands alone have their own provincial government known as REN-BEL, which recognizes Rennellese/Bellonese as its own language.

== Phonology ==
=== Consonants ===
Consonants in Rennellese
	Labial	Alveolar	Velar	Glottal
Nasal	m ⟨m⟩	n ⟨n⟩	ŋ ⟨ng⟩	
Plosive	p ⟨p⟩	t ⟨t⟩	k ⟨k⟩ ⁿg ⟨g⟩	ʔ ⟨‘⟩
Fricative	β ⟨b⟩	s ⟨s⟩	ɣ ⟨gh⟩	h ⟨h⟩
Sonorant		l ⟨l⟩		

All Rennellese and Bellonese words containing /ɣ/ and /l/ are non-Polynesian.

=== Vowels ===
The 5 vowels in the system are /a, e, i, o, u/. Rennellese possess ⟨‘⟩ which is a glottal stop used to lengthen vowel sounds. The ⟨‘⟩ can be written before or after the vowel it is lengthening, similar to an English apostrophe. Vowel length is also distributed (Elbert 1988).

=== Syllable structure ===
The typical syllable structure in Rennellese is (C)V. Rennellese favors vowels when making syllables, and not many consonant clusters (Elbert 1988).

== Grammar ==
=== Basic word order ===
The traditional word order for Rennellese is VSO, but more commonly among younger generations, SVO word order is used. Researchers speculate that this is due to outside influences from missionaries and World War II. The use of either word order is usually dependent on the person speaking, or whom that person may be speaking with. Both statements and questions may have different ways of being expressed solely based on who the speaker is.

Rennellese's morphology is polysynthetic, meaning it has a near-infinite number of morphemes that can be put into a word. Not only can some words have many morphemes, but the range between the amounts is high as well.

=== Reduplication ===
Many words in Rennellese use either whole or partial reduplication. Reduplication serves three main purposes in Rennellese: pluralization, making a word more specific, or changing the whole word.

agha → agha-agha
'vine' {} 'vines'

== Endangerment ==
=== Materials ===
There are many valuable resources that have been created to help maintain the language including a dictionary, and multiple books primarily written by Samuel H. Elbert. Elbert, along with several other researchers, dedicated an entire website to the people of Rennell and Bellona, called Bellona.dk. Rennellese is also the official language of Rennell and Bellona Province. With an official status in their country, the Rennellese have begun opening schools and other domains for the language to be used. The only problem is that some of these materials are from the 1960s–1990s, and are old and hard to come by.

=== Vitality ===
Rennellese is classified as a developing language. The number of speakers is only about 4,000 but there is use and intergenerational transmission of the language, allowing it to grow. Rennellese is used as a first language by the majority of the people of Rennell and Bellona. It serves many purposes, being used in education, business, and socializing. In the long term, Rennellese may be able to see further growth if more technological material is made to both preserve and spread the language.

== Sources ==
- Levinson, D. (1998). Ethnic Groups Worldwide: A Ready Reference Handbook. Greenwood Publishing Press.
