= Operation Zeta =

- Part of Portuguese Overseas War
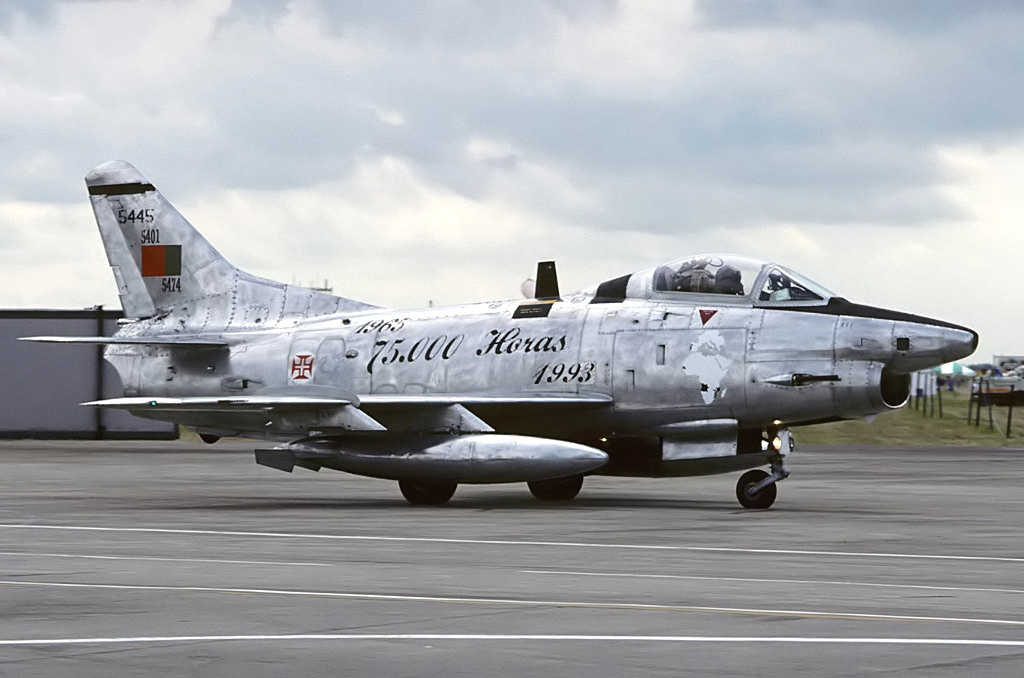
- A Portuguese Air Force G.91 fighter-bomber.
Date	June 6th to 11th, 1969
Location	Malambuage Swamp, Portuguese Mozambique
Result	Portuguese victory

Belligerents
(Estado Novo (Portugal)) Portugal	FRELIMO

Commanders and leaders
Unknown	Unknown

Units involved
(Estado Novo (Portugal)) Portuguese Army (Estado Novo (Portugal)) Portuguese Commandos (Estado Novo (Portugal)) Portuguese Air Force (Estado Novo (Portugal)) Portuguese Cavalry	Unknown

Casualties and losses
Low	Very heavy Huge loss of war material and transport

The Operation Zeta was a military action between Portuguese and FRELIMO forces during the Portuguese Overseas War. It took place from June 6 to 11, 1969, in the Malambuage swamp, a wetland region on the south bank of the Ruvuma River, in the current province of Cabo Delgado.

More than two hundred paratroopers jumped over the Malambuage swamp, surprised and stormed FRELIMO strongholds; They killed several dozen guerrillas during the fiercest fighting, seized large quantities of war material and surrounded the entire enemy cantonment area. For three days, the paratroopers consolidated their dominant positions, covered the ground between the Ruvuma river and the base of Limpopo, in Balade, south of the swamp, searched and lifted FRELIMO mines/traps and finally, made connections with the FRELIMO combat groups that surrounded the buffer-shaped area to the south, east and west of the Ruvuma river. In those days of intense combat, a company of Commandos took over the logistical camp from the guerrillas, south of the swamp. The two Army Companies, the C. Cav. 2376 of Nangade broke into the woods near the Lidede lake and the Nange river valley and assaulted a guerrilla hospital, collecting various war material, documents and capturing enemy elements. The other Army Company, C. Cav. 2375 from Mocimboa do Rovuma, hit the land west of the swamp and helped the paratroopers to collect the jumping material.

During the entire operation, air support was important, with a Dornier Do 27 in operational command, a helicopter armed with heavy machine guns, eight T6 aircraft to attack enemy groups trying to escape the siege, two PV2 bomber aircraft, four Nordatlas and three Dakotas at the paratroopers' launch. The bombing of fugitive guerilla groups helped to weaken their combative momentum and cut off their lines of escape.

Due to the meticulous collection of information, carefully tested, and the consequent secrecy in very short-term planning, Operation Zeta was one of the most important military missions carried out in Mozambique. The results attest to the success of Portuguese troops, whose coordination exceeded the best prospects, given the impossibility of accessing an area controlled by the enemy and the distances from any support point without being dismounted.

The Commander of the 32nd Parachute Hunter Battalion, based in Nacala, was in charge of coordinating all troops in action, especially air support, marking precursors, means of collecting parachutes, logistics for the auto columns that collected the personnel and the seized material. The paratroopers involved in the actions that culminated in this operation belonged to BCP32 and BCP31. Its high mobility allowed it to inflict a resounding defeat on the guerrillas, dismantling their infiltration lines from bases in Tanzania, namely the logistical command in Nachingwea and the personnel coming from the training center in Mtwara, using the road from Mahuta to Newala, north of the Ruvuma river. The number of hidden paths, trails and hiding places spread across an area larger than twenty football fields was indeed impressive, most of it towards the river crossing point, towards the road that connects to the interior of Tanzania.

== Seized material ==
- The Portuguese joint force of approximately 680 personnel, 48 vehicles, and over a dozen aircraft were deployed to engage and defeat a separate force consisting of more than 200 FRELIMO guerrillas. Portuguese units dismantled the guerrilla infrastructure via destruction of shelters, logistical support camps, burning food stores, and dispersing livestock. However, various paratroopers managed to evade the oversight of their commanders by remaining concealed in their camouflage gear, later bringing out chickens for a barbecue on the final day.

In addition to the documentation on FRELIMO's organization, more than 7,600 kg of valuable war material, bicycles and other means of transport across the Ruvuma river were seized.

=== By the Paratroopers ===
- 1723 82mm mortar grenades;
- 2 complete 82mm mortars and other parts;
- 182 Simonov rifles and 200,700 cartridges;
- 1 heavy machine gun and 6 light machine guns;
- 63 hand grenades and 21 trip traps;
- Various equipment.

=== By the Army troops C.Cav.2376 from Nangade and C.Cav.2375 from Mocimboa do Rovuma, especially by the Commandos ===
- 97 semi-automatic rifles and 18,200 magazines;
- 8 PPSH automatic rifles;
- 1 82mm mortar and 93 mortar grenades;
- 5 heavy machine guns;
- Dozens of mines and traps;
- Several defensive grenades;
- Uniforms and various campaign material.

=== Other means of action ===
- Seven transport planes (4 Nordatlas and 3 Dakotas);
- Ten combat aircraft (8 light T-6s and 2 heavy PV2s);
- A Dornier DO27, in operational command;
- A “Heli-cannon” with heavy machine gun;
- More than thirty car drivers.

== See also ==
- Operation Jove
- Mozambican War of Independence
- Operation Gordian Knot
