= Tepaeru Tereora =

Cook Islands artist and educator

Mere Tepaeru Tereora QSM (born 1934) is a Cook Islands artist and educator. Her Tivaevae work is internationally recognised and displayed in the Museum of New Zealand Te Papa Tongarewa. She is also a significant figure in the revival of Cook Islands Māori, establishing language nests for it in New Zealand. She is the sister of writer Kauraka Kauraka.

== Biography ==
Tereora was born on the island of Manihiki. She was sent to Rarotonga in 1944 for schooling, where she became involved in the Girl Guides. In 1954 she travelled to New Zealand to train as a teacher, then returned to the Cook Islands, where she taught at Avarua School, Manihiki, Atiu, Nikao School and Tereora College. In 1964 she was appointed women's interest officer and began travelling around the Cook Islands teaching a home education programme, including tivaevae.

In 1969 she moved to Wellington, New Zealand, where she became active in the Māori Women's Welfare League. In 1983 she helped establish Kōhanga Reo as part of the Māori language revival. As part of this work she established Te Punanga o te reo Kuki Airani, a language nest for Cook Islands Māori in Wellington, starting the centre in her garage. In 1991 she became founding president of the national organisation for such nests, Te Punanga o te reo Kuki Airani o Aotearoa. She later helped develop a curriculum for Cook Islands Māori for New Zealand schools and wrote children's stories in the language and in Manihikian.

In 1976 Tereora became a founding member of P.A.C.I.F.I.C.A, and served as its president from 1993 to 1997. She was also a founder of Aotearoa Moana Nui A Kiwa Weavers, which later became Te Roopu Raranga Whatu o Aotearoa.

== Recognition ==
In the 1993 Queen's Birthday Honours, Tereora was awarded the Queen's Service Medal for public services.

In October 2019, Tereora was inducted into the hall of fame at the inaugural Vaine Rangatira awards for Cook Islands women.

== Bibliography ==
- Tumutu, Sunblossom Press, Rarotonga, 1994
- `Aere na roto i te ua ki te kainga (Going Home in the Rain), Ueringitone, Te ʻAre Turuturu ʻĀpiʻi, 1995
- Rūkou nō te rā ʻānauʻanga : ʻe tua Kūki ʻAirani nō Niu Tirēni (A Pot of Rukou for Birthday Cake), Ueringitone, Te ʻAre Turuturu ʻĀpiʻi, 2002
