= Cook Islands permanent residency =

Cook Islands permanent residents are residents of the Cook Islands who hold permanent residency visas and who are not ethnic Cook Islanders.

== Eligibility criteria ==
A person who fulfils the following criteria is eligible to apply for permanent residency in the Cook Islands:

- Has resided in the Cook Islands for the past 10 years (or, for New Zealand citizens, the past three years); and
- Has made a significant and positive contribution to and/or investment in the Cook Islands (particularly in terms of skills, expertise, community work or financial investment).

By law, a maximum of 650 Cook Islands Permanent Residence certificates may be in effect at any one moment (excluding certificates issued to spouses of Cook Islanders or Cook Islands permanent residents who have been married for at least five years). Therefore, after applying for permanent residency in the Cook Islands, a person may have to wait until a Permanent Residence certificate can be issued.

== History ==
In 2018 the Cook Islands Government reviewed immigration and citizenship legislation. The proposed new rules will make permanent residency harder to obtain by imposing both English and Cook Islands Māori language requirements, requiring participating in a values program and imposing community service requirements. The number of permanent residency places will be retained at 650, though partners of Cook Islands citizens will not count towards the cap. In October 2020 the Cook Islands parliament passed constitutional amendments required to allow the bill to take effect. The Constitution Amendment (No. 29) Act relating to permanent residency was passed in November 2021. The Cook Islands Immigration Act was enacted in December 2021.

== See also ==
- Cook Islands nationality
