= Tongareva =

Tongareva may refer to:

- Tongareva atoll
- Tongareva language
