= Ngangie =

Coordinates: 10°1′11.88″S 161°4′59.91″W

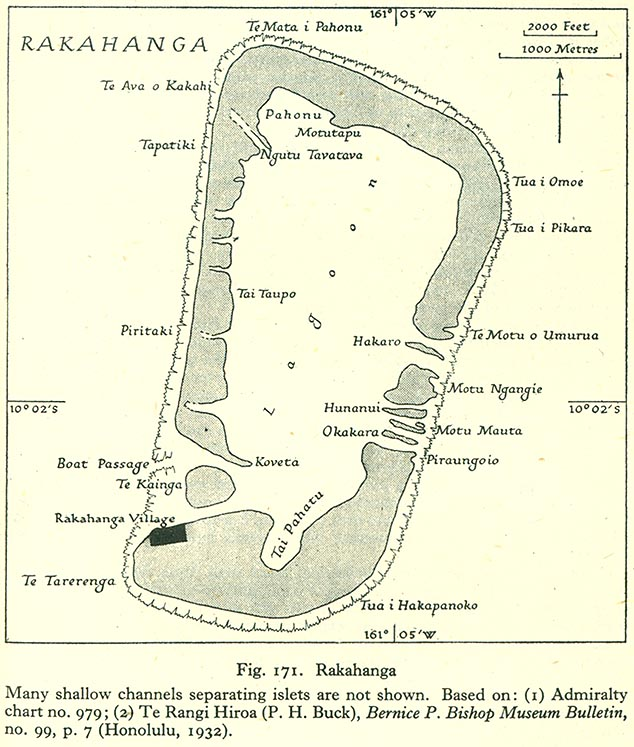
Map of Rakahanga Atoll

Ngangie is one of 11 islands in the Rakahanga atoll of the Cook Islands. It is a motu on the east of the atoll, between the islets of Huananui and Akaro.
