= Paerangi =

Island of Rakahanga, Cook Islands

Coordinates: 10°1′23.81″S 161°5′55.39″W

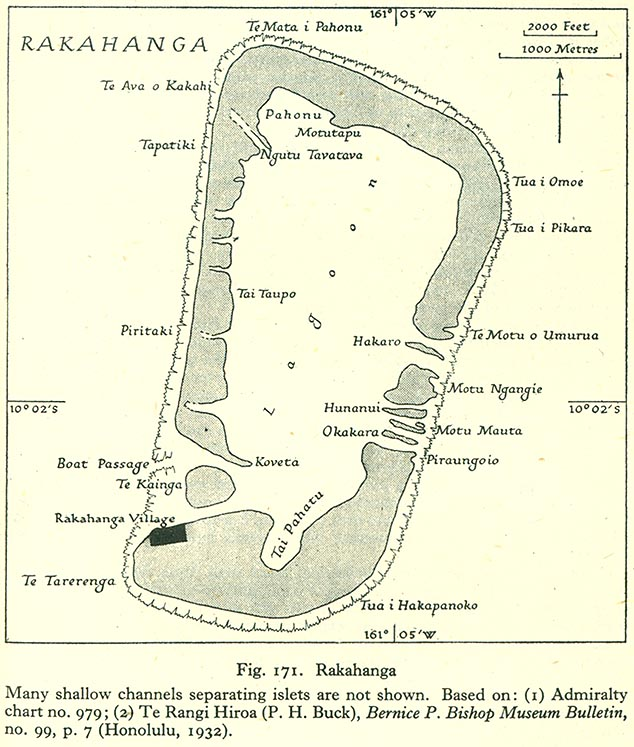
Map of Rakahanga Atoll

Paerangi is one of 11 islands in the Rakahanga atoll of the Cook Islands. It is in the southwest of the atoll, between the islands of Tetaha Kiraro and Te Kainga.
