= Cook Islanders =

Polynesian ethnic group from the Cook Islands

Total population
- 100,000–120,000

Regions with significant populations
- New Zealand: 94,176 (2023)
- Australia: 28,000 (2021)
- Cook Islands: 11,603 (2021)

Languages
- English (86.4%); Cook Islands Māori (76.2%); Penrhyn; Rakahanga-Manihiki; Pukapukan

Related ethnic groups
- Polynesians; Māori; Tahitians

Location of the Cook Islands

Cook Islanders are residents of the Cook Islands, which is composed of 15 islands and atolls in Polynesia in the Pacific Ocean. Cook Islands Māori are the indigenous Polynesian people of the Cook Islands. Only 15–17% of Cook Islands Māori people live in the Cook Islands now, with New Zealand and Australia each having larger populations. Originating from Tahitian settlers in the sixth century, the Cook Islands Māori bear cultural affinities with New Zealand Māori and Tahitian Mā'ohi, although they have a unique culture and their own language, which is one of two official languages in the Cook Islands.

== Citizenship and nationality ==
From a legal standpoint, there is no such thing as Cook Islands citizenship. The Cook Islands is a self-governing country in free association with New Zealand and within the Realm of New Zealand, and Cook Islanders are New Zealand citizens.

The Cook Islands does not issue its own passports, a privilege usually assumed by virtually all sovereign countries, but places this responsibility in the hands of the New Zealand Government which issues passports for New Zealand citizens who are also Cook Islands nationals.

On the other hand, Cook Islands nationality is differentiated from that of the rest of the New Zealand citizens.

A person shall have the status of a permanent resident of the Cook Islands if he was born in the Cook Islands, and -

1. Either or both of his parents had the status of a permanent resident of the Cook Islands at the date of his birth; or
2. In the case of a child who was born after the death of his father to a mother who did not have the status at the date of birth of the child, his father had that status at the date of his death; or
3. He was adopted by a person who at the date of adoption had that status.

— Cook Islands Constitution, Constitution Amendment (No 9) Act 1980–81, Article 76A(1)

These provisions setting out qualifications for the status of a permanent resident of the Cook Islands are supplemented by other legislation to regulate the granting of permanent resident status to others, qualifications to be held by a permanent resident, and conditions under which that status may be withdrawn.

In mid-October 2024, Cook Islands Prime Minister Mark Brown advocated the introduction of a separate Cook Islands passport while still retaining New Zealand citizenship. In response, New Zealand Foreign Minister Winston Peters warned that Brown's proposal would affect the Cook Island's free association relationship with New Zealand. In late December 2024, Peters clarified that the Cook Islands would not be able to have its own passport, citizenship and United Nations membership without becoming an independent country. Any changes to the territory's constitutional relationship with New Zealand would have to be decided by the Cook Islanders via a referendum.

== Ethnic groups ==
According to the 2016 census, 78.2% of Cook Islanders are of Cook Island Māori descent, 7.6% are part-Māori from the native Polynesian people of the islands and 14.2% other ethnic origins. Cook Islands Māori share many ancestral links with the Māori of New Zealand and the native people (Mā'ohi) of French Polynesia. Other Cook Islanders are of Pacific Islander (primarily Polynesian), European (Papa'a), or Asian descent.

Figures for the usual resident population:

Ethnic group	Population (2006)	Population (2016)	Percent	Change
Cook Islands Māori	14,938	11,575	78.2	▼
Part Cook Islands Māori	1,045	1,128	7.6	▲
Other	1,349	2,099	14.2	▲
Total	17,332	14,802	100.0	▼

== Language ==
The official languages of the Cook Islands are English and Cook Islands Māori, an Eastern Polynesian language. Cook Islands Māori is closely related to New Zealand Māori, but is a distinct language in its own right. It is simply called "Māori" when there is no need to disambiguate it from New Zealand Māori, but it is also known as "Māori Kūki 'Āirani" or "Maori Kuki Airani".

== Religious denomination ==
The religious distribution in the 2021 official census was as follows: The various Protestant groups account for 63.2% of the believers, the most followed denomination being the Cook Islands Christian Church with 43.1% (down from 48.8% in 2016). Other Protestant Christian groups include Seventh-Day Adventist (8.2%), Assemblies of God (3.5%), and Apostolic Church (2.1%). The main non-Protestant group was the Catholic Church, with 16.6% of the population. Members of the Church of Jesus Christ of Latter-day Saints made up 3.9%. Only 2% or 323 people refused or did not respond to this question.

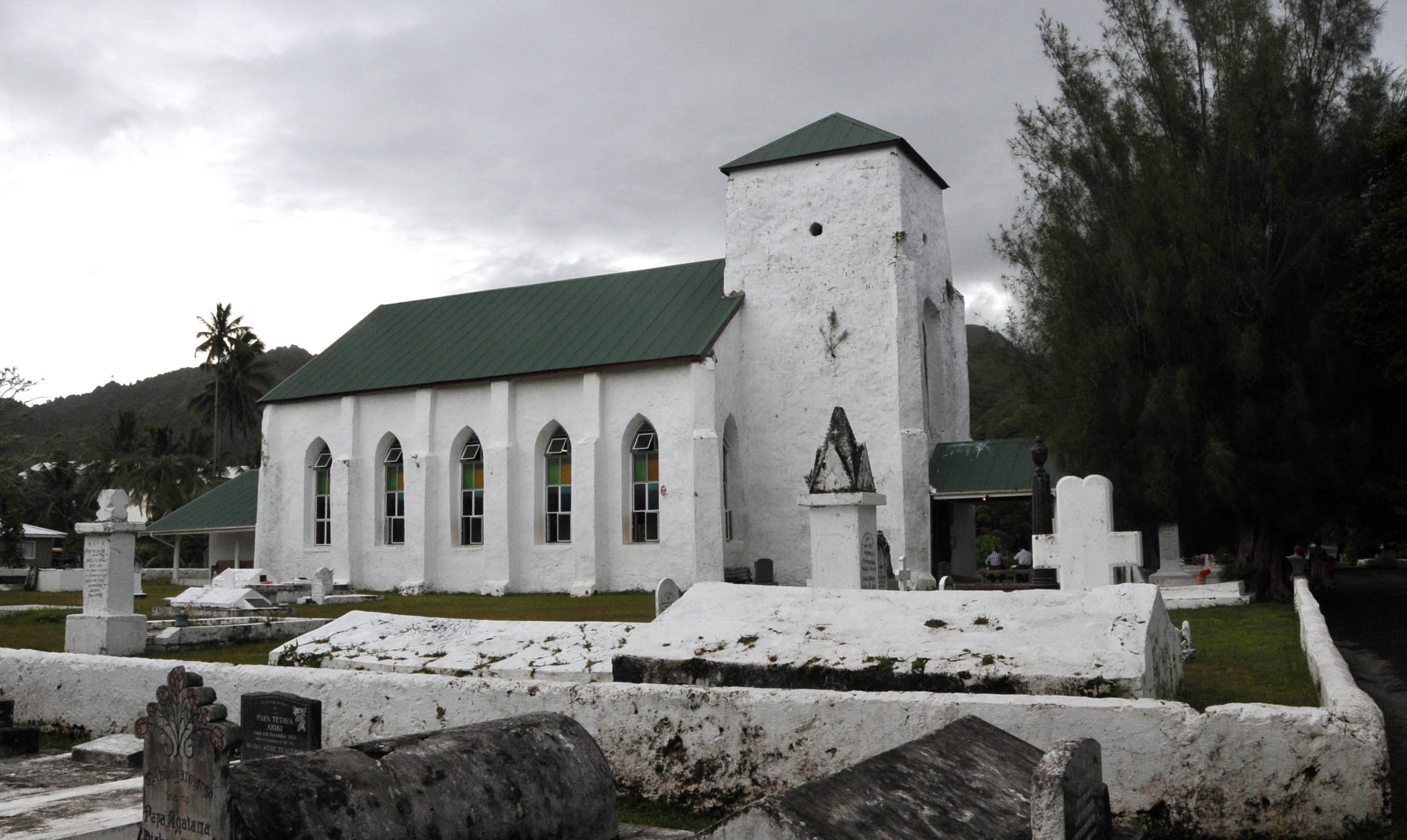
Church in Avarua, Rarotonga

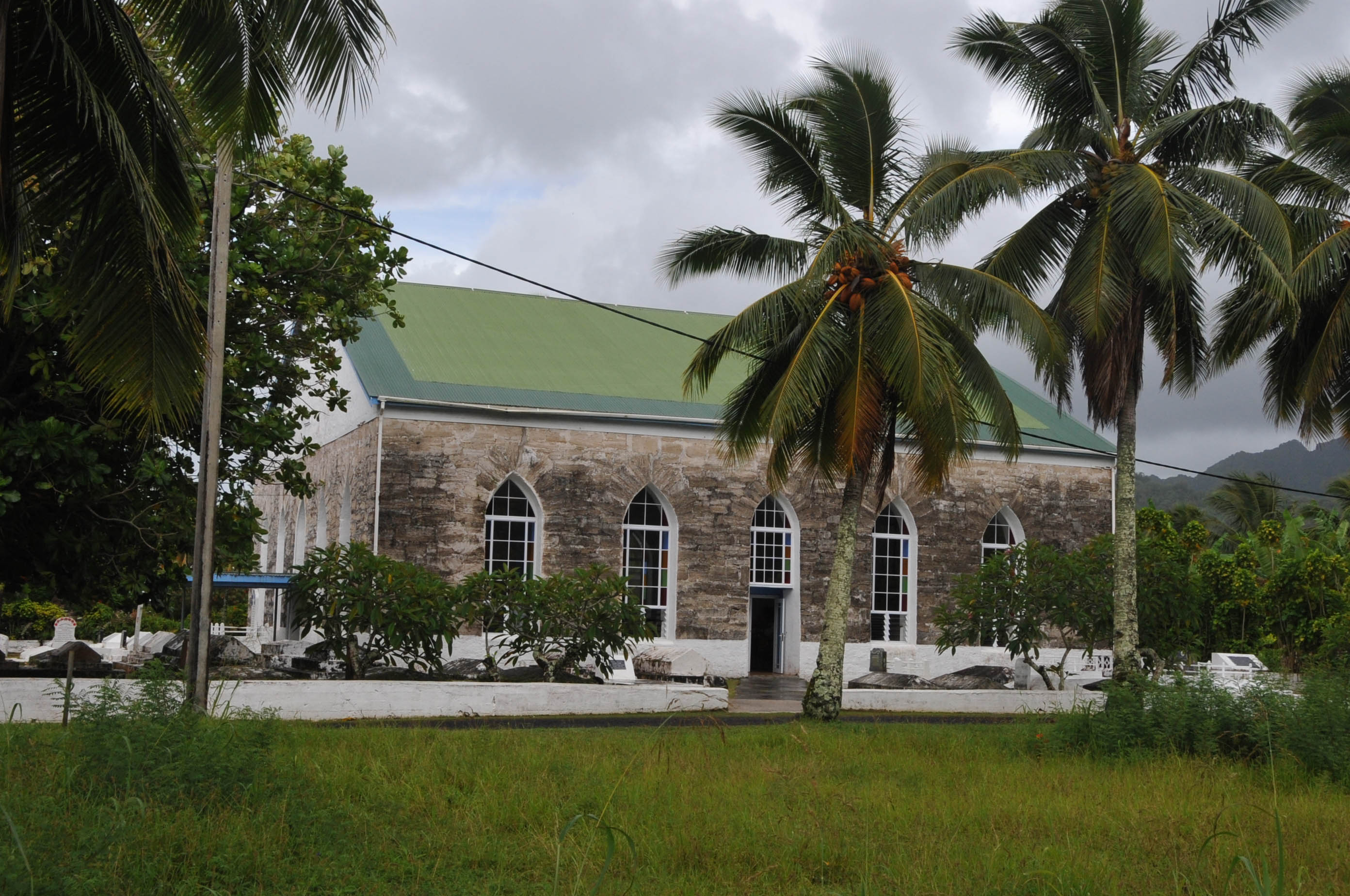
Titikaveka Church, Rarotonga

Religious affiliation	Population	Percent
Christian	11,980	79.94
Cook Islands Christian Church	6,461	43.11
Catholic	2,500	16.68
Seventh-day Adventist	1,241	8.28
Church of Jesus Christ of Latter-day Saints	591	3.94
Assemblies of God	535	3.57
Jehovah's Witness	330	2.20
Apostolic	322	2.15
Irreligion/Not Stated	2,338	15.60
Other	669	4.46
Total	14,987	100

== See also ==
- Cook Islands permanent residency
