= American–Portuguese crisis =

Political crisis between 1961 and 1963

The American–Portuguese crisis was a political conflict between the United States and Portugal regarding Portuguese colonialism in Africa. This conflict began in 1961 and ended in 1963 after the Kennedy administration failed to influence the events in Portugal and in Africa, mainly in Angola. According to Professor Luís Rodrigues, "Portugal proved to be the little David who ultimately forced Goliath to change its behavior."

== Background ==
In May 1960 the then president of the United States of America, Eisenhower visited Lisbon and was introduced with António de Oliveira Salazar, who was alarmed by "the creation of a multitude of new independent nations" in Africa and argued that nationalism could be the ideal antidote to the penetration of communism.

== Angola question ==
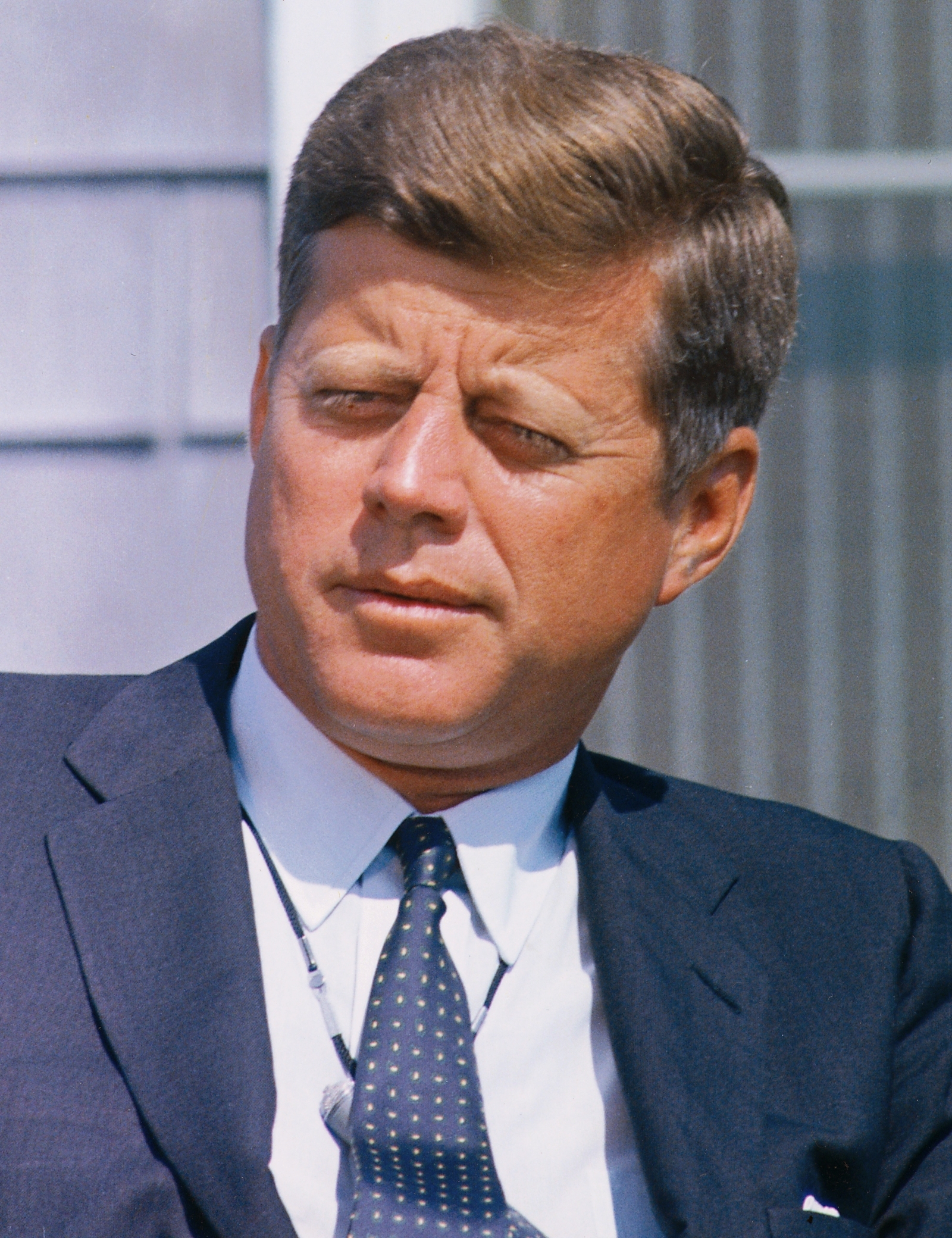
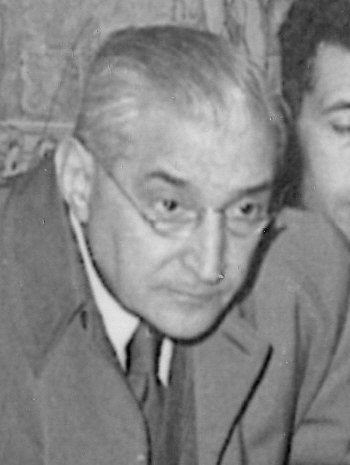
US President John F. Kennedy (left) and prime-minister of Portugal António de Oliveira Salazar (right).

The election of John F. Kennedy was a matter of serious concern to the Portuguese government, which feared that the new president of the United States would adopt an anti-colonialism position; in March 1961 Kennedy decided that the USUN should vote in favor of a resolution by creating a commission to investigate what was happening in Angola. On that same day, members of the União dos Povos de Angola (UPA) launched a terrorist attack against Portuguese settlers and administrative posts in Northern Angola. This attack would initiate a war that would last until the Carnation Revolution in 1974.

The United States believed it should abandon their vague attitude towards European colonialism and start supporting the self-determination of Africans, therefore, they began to intensify their contacts with Angolan nationalist organizations, especially the UPA, which was led by Holden Roberto. On the other hand, the administration, imposed a new arms policy against Portugal in August 1961. The United States refused to sell Portugal military equipment destined for "non-NATO" purposes, ruling out its use in Africa and John Kennedy himself advised António Salazar for Portugal to abandon its overseas territories in Africa.

This new policy was proved to be short-lived, and in 1962 the US began to abstain itself from voting on resolutions against Portuguese colonialism or even sometimes rejecting them. American contacts with Angolan factions also significantly reduced and military equipment was, once again, being shipped to Portugal. This was mainly due to the American military base in the Azores, which was very important and one of the reasons why Portugal, a non-democratic and colonial nation was able to be part of NATO.

== Botelho Moniz coup attempt ==
The Botelho Moniz coup of 1961 was an attempted constitutional coup d'état in Portugal, led by the General Botelho Moniz, with the objective of removing Salazar from power. While it is not officially confirmed, it is believed that the United States of America allegedly supported Moniz and were hoping for changes in the political orientation of the Portuguese administration.

== "Angola or the Azores?" ==
While the Americans wanted to implement their resolution on Portuguese colonial policy in Angola, they could not forget about their military base in the Azores, because if they had angered the Portuguese, there would be a possibility that they wouldn't renew the contract that allowed that base to exist.

The American military base in the Azores was very important as it was placed in a strategic position in the Atlantic Ocean and with the Cold War raging on, the United States could not afford to lose it. The Portuguese knew about this and so they used it as their "Trump card" to obtain favourable responses from them.

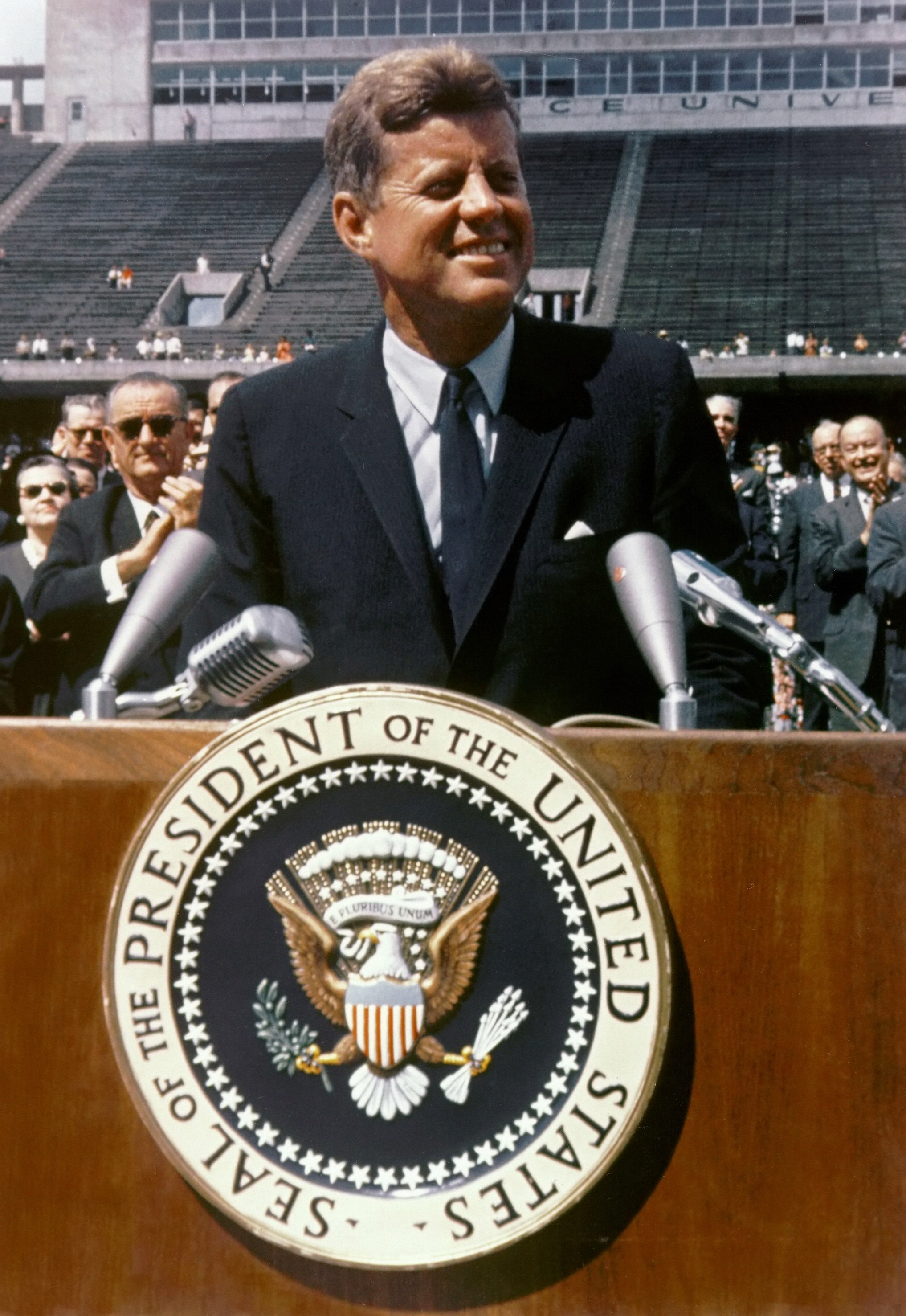
John F. Kennedy speaks at Rice University

The potential denial of the Azores would result in a substantial loss of air transport cargo capacity and lead to increased troop deployment closure times. Second, the absence of the Azores would necessitate routing aircraft over less favorable weather conditions, particularly impacting air refueling operations for deploying tactical fighter aircraft. Third, the loss of the base would diminish the flexibility of air operations by limiting available routes. Finally, it would severely impair command and control of military air operations over a significant portion of the Atlantic Ocean.

Conclusion of the debate

The "Angola or Azores" debate concluded around the middle of 1962. President Kennedy had decided himself after listening to the Pentagon and proponents of the European interests. The Anti-Portuguese policies approved in 1961 were to undergo a gradual shift towards a more pro-Portuguese stance. Despite his initial leaning towards the African rebels viewpoint, Kennedy recognized the significance of the Azores base to the United States' national security and the nation's overseas base infrastructure.

== Aftermath ==
Looking at United States-Portugal relations during the Kennedy era, it's clear that American dominance had its limits. Despite its power, the United States couldn't control events in Portugal as it wished. It was the American government that had to change its policies to face the challenges posed by Portugal.

== See also ==
- Portuguese Colonial War
- António de Oliveira Salazar
- John F. Kennedy
- Operation Jove
- Portugal
