= Cook Islands Local Defence Force =

Military unit

- Location map of the Cook Islands
- Active: 9 April 1941 – 14 September 1945
- Disbanded: 14 September 1945
- Allegiance: (United Kingdom) British Empire; Dominion of New Zealand
- Role: Garrison duty, civil defense
- Size: Territorial unit
- Garrison/HQ: Rarotonga, Cook Islands

The Cook Islands Local Defence Force was a military and civil defense force active in the Cook Islands from 1941 to 1945. The force was created in response to World War II, which threatened the security of the islands.

== History ==
=== Background ===
The Cook Islands had become a British protectorate in 1888, which granted the islands the protection of the British Empire. The decision to offer the islands protectorate status was done in part to expand British influence in the South Pacific, while also serving to counter growing French influence in the region. The islands were annexed into the empire in 1900, with the new territories being placed under the administration of the Colony of New Zealand and forming an administrative department in 1903.

The territory contributed several detachments of soldiers to the British war effort during World War I, serving mainly in Egypt and Palestine, but the islands were otherwise not involved in the conflict.

=== Formation ===
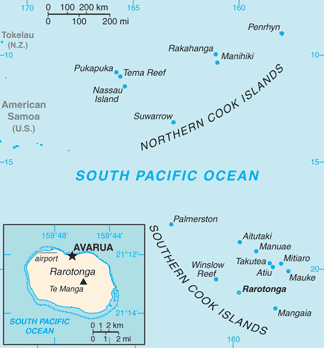
The Cook Islands, showing Rarotonga, the most populous island

Following the British Empire's entry into World War II in September 1939, Cook Islanders began to take notice of the conflict. Less than two weeks after the British entry into the-then European theatre of the war, a local resident made a report on the island's defenses and drew up a list of likely targets. Though the islands were remote and had relatively minor strategic value, the report noted that the islands could be attacked by a hostile nation seeking to disrupt the isolated radio station present on the islands. The report recommended the formation of a 100-strong volunteer force made up from local islanders and commanded by NCOs with experience from the previous world war. The garrison force would be supplied by New Zealand colonial forces. This 1939 defensive report was not fully acted upon, but was raised in August 1940 during early discussions with the New Zealand government on the potential defense of the islands.

In October 1940, a New Zealand military committee noted that Rarotonga was a possible, if unlikely, target and so recommended the formation of a militia in the Cook Islands. Legal basis for the formation of a militia in the islands was approved in December 1940, and New Zealand agreed to supply the new force with weapons and equipment. The main purpose of the militia was to prevent an enemy force from easily re-provisioning in the islands and to report on enemy activity; it was also noted that arming the local militia would serve "to uphold the prestige of the Cook Islands from easily falling into enemy hands without resistance". The New Zealand government was opposed to sending Cook Islanders overseas because units from the islands had suffered heavy casualties through disease during the First World War. The general order to form the defense force was issued on 9 April 1941, with Captain R.M.L. Gladney (a Canadian veteran of World War I) in command. The force was headquartered in a vacant building in Avarua.

=== Service ===
The force began recruiting in May 1941. Terms of service required that soldiers be male, between the ages of 18 and 50, pass a medical inspection, and take an oath of allegiance. Members of the force were required to remain in uniform, and were granted pay and rations. The force took efforts to ensure recruits were drawn from multiple villages in the islands to avoid the appearance of favoritism. As the islands lacked any territorials, local Cook Islanders made up the vast majority of the garrison, with European officers being in command. Khaki uniforms with skirts and felt hats were worn; most soldiers were armed with rifles or pistols, and there were several light machine guns. There were 425 men who volunteered for service, but only 100 made it through the selection process and entered service. Disagreements arose about the force's constitution, with the local officials envisioning a full-time military unit and those from New Zealand favoring a local militia. The primary duties of the force involved patrolling the coasts of Rarotonga for signs of enemy activity, which at the time was speculated would involve submarines and commerce raiders.

Following Japan's entry into the war in December 1941, efforts to improve the islands' defenses greatly increased with the force being given more weapons. Additional NCOs were sent to Rarotonga in February 1942. Efforts to patrol the islands were scaled back in the summer of 1942 due to the increasingly large American military presence in the area, and by December of that year any threat of invasion had greatly decreased. The force reverted to territorial status on 7 August 1943. From 27 to 31 December 1944, the force was reviewed by New Zealand Prime Minister Peter Fraser during his visit to the Cook Islands. With the effective end of the war in early September, the force was officially disbanded on 14 September 1945, with a final parade being conducted by the unit on 19 September. Disbanded soldiers were allowed to keep their uniforms (excepting their felt hats, badges, and straw mattresses) and paid a bonus of £10.

For their service during the war, 81 members of the Force were considered for service medals. A number of other locals (65) served with the force in some capacity but were not considered eligible for service awards.
