= Māngarongaro =

Māngarongaro may be,

- Mangarongaro atoll
- Mangarongaro language
