= Te Motu o Umurua =

Coordinates: 10°0′59.07″S 161°4′50.9″W

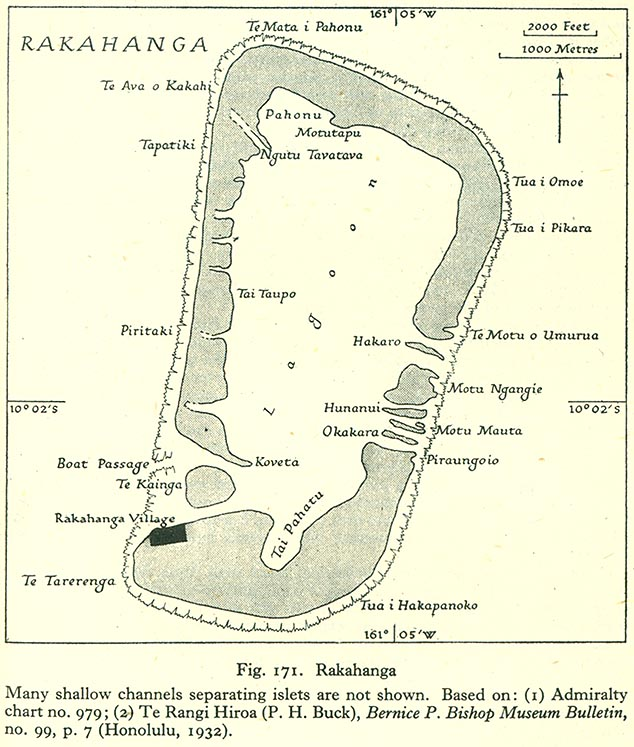
Map of Rakahanga Atoll

Te Motu o Umurua is one of 11 islands in the Rakahanga atoll of the Cook Islands. It is on the east of the atoll, next to the island of Tetukono.
