= Akaro =

Coordinates: 10°1′2.94″S 161°4′59.18″W

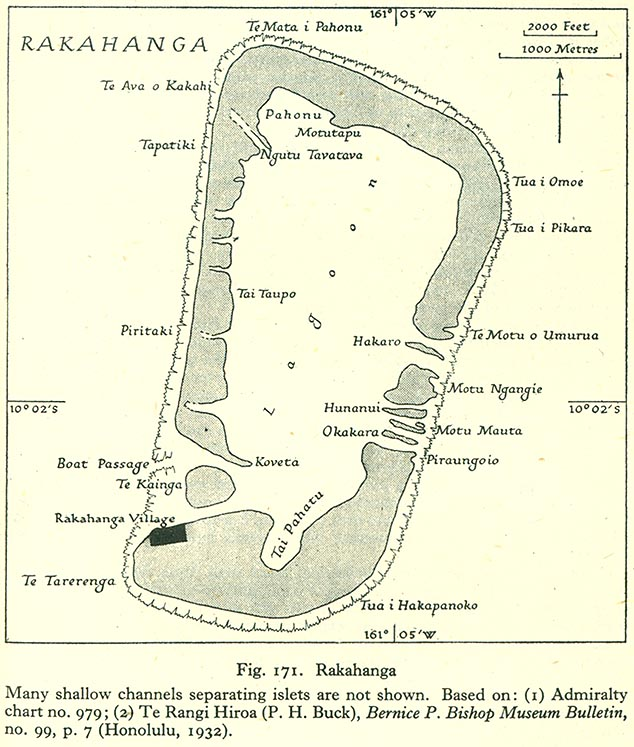
Map of Rakahanga Atoll

Akaro is one of 11 islands in the Rakahanga atoll of the Cook Islands. It is on the east of the atoll, between the islets of Tetukono and Okakara.
