= Okakara =

Island of Rakahanga, Cook Islands

Coordinates: 10°1′26.11″S 161°5′6.25″W

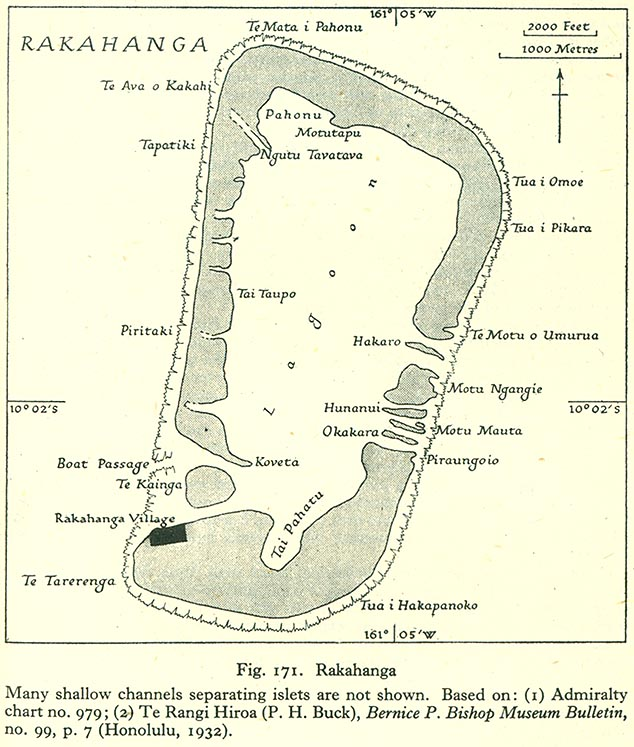
Map of Rakahanga Atoll

Okakara is one of 11 islands in the Rakahanga atoll of the Cook Islands. It is on the east of the atoll, between the islets of Mahuta and Rakahanga Island.
