= Huananui =

Island in the Cook Islands

Coordinates: 10°1′18.77″S 161°5′2.58″W

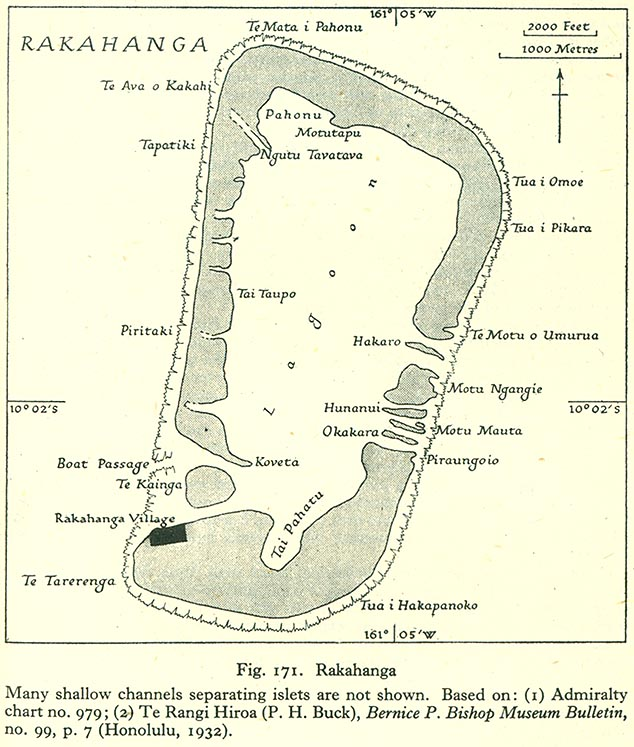
Map of Rakahanga Atoll

Huananui is one of 11 islands in the Rakahanga atoll of the Cook Islands. It is on the east of the atoll, between the islets of Ngangie and Mahuta.
