= Tetaha Kiraro =

Coordinates: 10°0′36.52″S 161°5′54.03″W

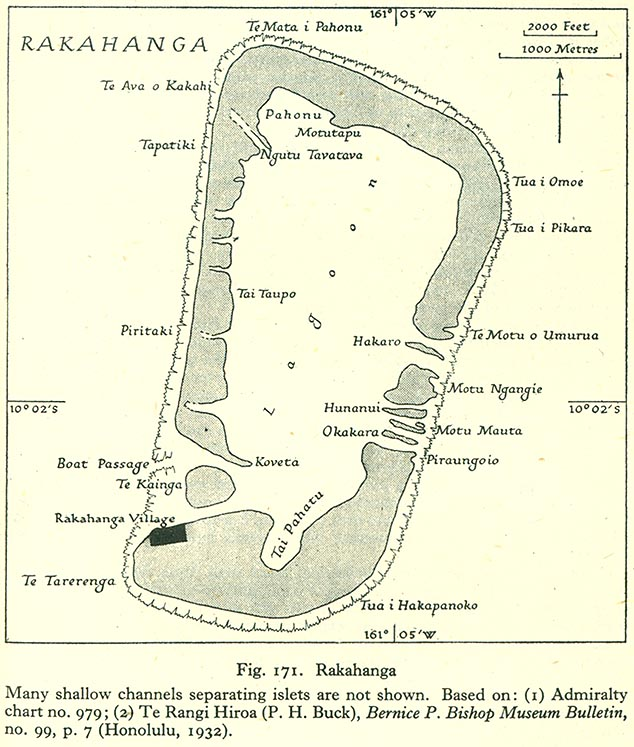
Map of Rakahanga Atoll

Tetaha Kiraro is one of 11 islands in the Rakahanga atoll of the Cook Islands. It is on the west of the atoll, between the islands of Tetukono and Paerangi.
