= Te Kainga =

Coordinates: 10°1′40.83″S 161°5′55.18″W

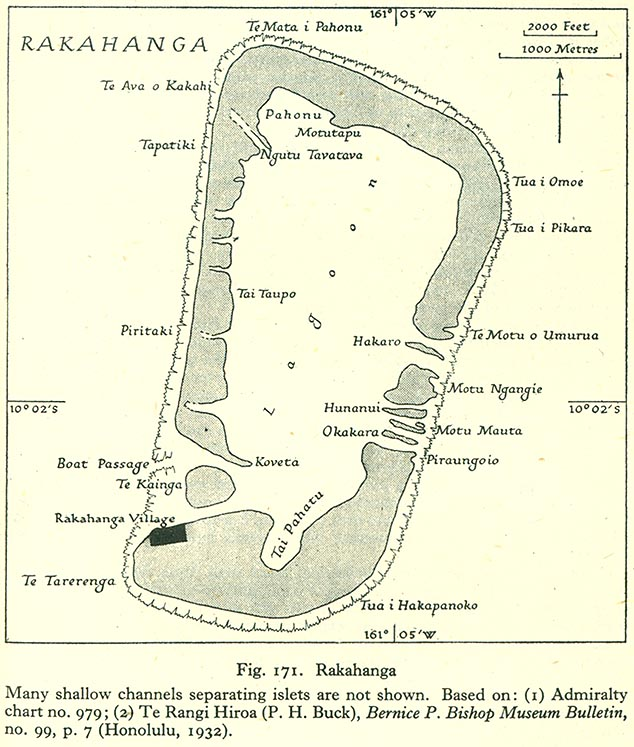
Map of Rakahanga Atoll

Te Kainga ("the Home") is one of 11 islands in the Rakahanga atoll of the Cook Islands. The island once served as the principal inhabited island of Rakahanga, but the settlement was moved to Rakahanga Island in the missionary era. The single village was shared by the atoll's four tribes, and was surrounded by five marae: Punariku, Avarua, Huku-wananga, Mua, and Variu.
