= Rakahanga =

Atoll in the Cook Islands

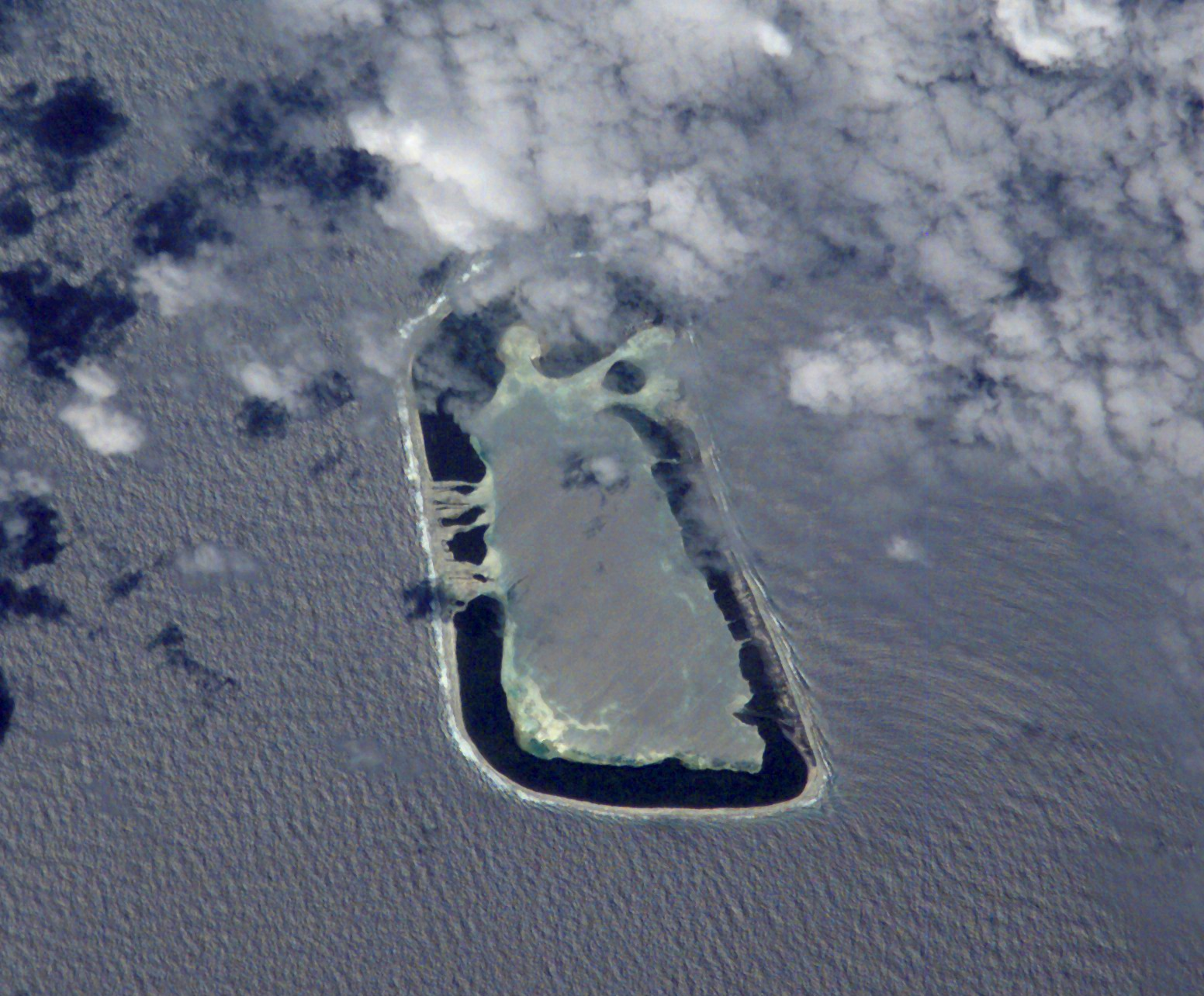
- NASA picture of Rakahanga
- Interactive map of Rakahanga

Geography
- Location: Central-Southern Pacific Ocean
- Coordinates: 10°02′S 161°05′W
- Archipelago: Cook Islands
- Total islands: 11
- Major islands: Rakahanga
- Area: 4 km^{2} (1.5 sq mi)

Administration
- Cook Islands
- Largest settlement: Rakahanga

Demographics
- Population: 83
- Pop. density: 32/km^{2} (83/sq mi)
- Ethnic groups: Nu-matua, Tia-ngaro-tonga

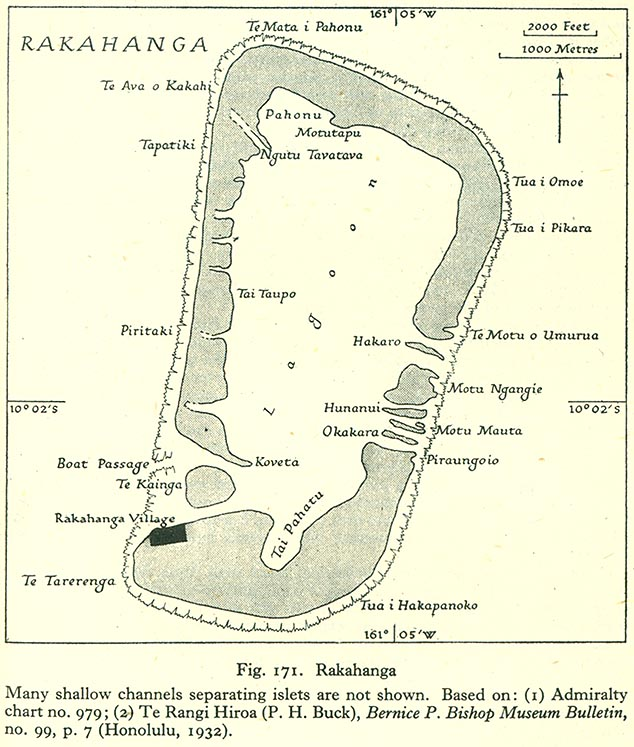
Map of Rakahanga Atoll

Rakahanga is part of the Cook Islands, situated in the central-southern Pacific Ocean. The unspoilt atoll is 1,248 kilometres (775 miles) from the Cook Islands' capital, Rarotonga, and lies 1,111 kilometres (690 miles) south of the equator. Its nearest neighbour is Manihiki which is just 44 kilometres (27 miles) away. Rakahanga's area is 4 square kilometres (1.5 sq mi). Its highest point is approximately 5 metres above sea level. The population was 83 in the 2016 Census of Population & Dwellings, with a density ratio of 32 people per square kilometer. Since 2014 Rakahanga's electricity has been 100% solar generated. The Rakahanga-Manihiki language differs from Cook Islands Maori.

== Geography ==
There are four main islands and seven motus or islets in the Rakahanga lagoon. The northern island is divided into three: Tetukono in the north and northeast, Tetaha Kiraro in the west, and Paerangi in the southwest; while the southern island is Rakahanga. The motus are: on the east, Te Motu o Umurua, Akaro, Motu Ngangie, Huananui, Motu Mahuta and Motu Okakara; while on the southwest side the islet of Te Kainga guards the widest passage into the lagoon. The north-east coast has sandy beaches. The west coast is rubble and beach rock (a conglomerate of coral and shell) over old reef rock. The atoll is densely vegetated with coconut palms.

Rakahanga is just over 4 square kilometres in size. Its highest point is about 5 metres (17 feet) and like the other Northern Cook Island atolls, Rakahanga is in danger from rising sea levels. Its large lagoon is shallow with poor sea water circulation, which is unfavourable for coral growth. The natural entrances to the lagoon are narrow and shallow, passable only by canoes and small boats with skilled captains. A deeper channel was created in about 2015 under a Harbour Improvement program.

Rakahanga's settlement is on the northwest side of the southern islet and consists of five adjoining villages (which might represent the lineages living in the same village:)

- Purapoto
- Niteiri
- Numahanga
- Teruakiore
- Matara (main settlement and seat of the Rakahanga Island Council)

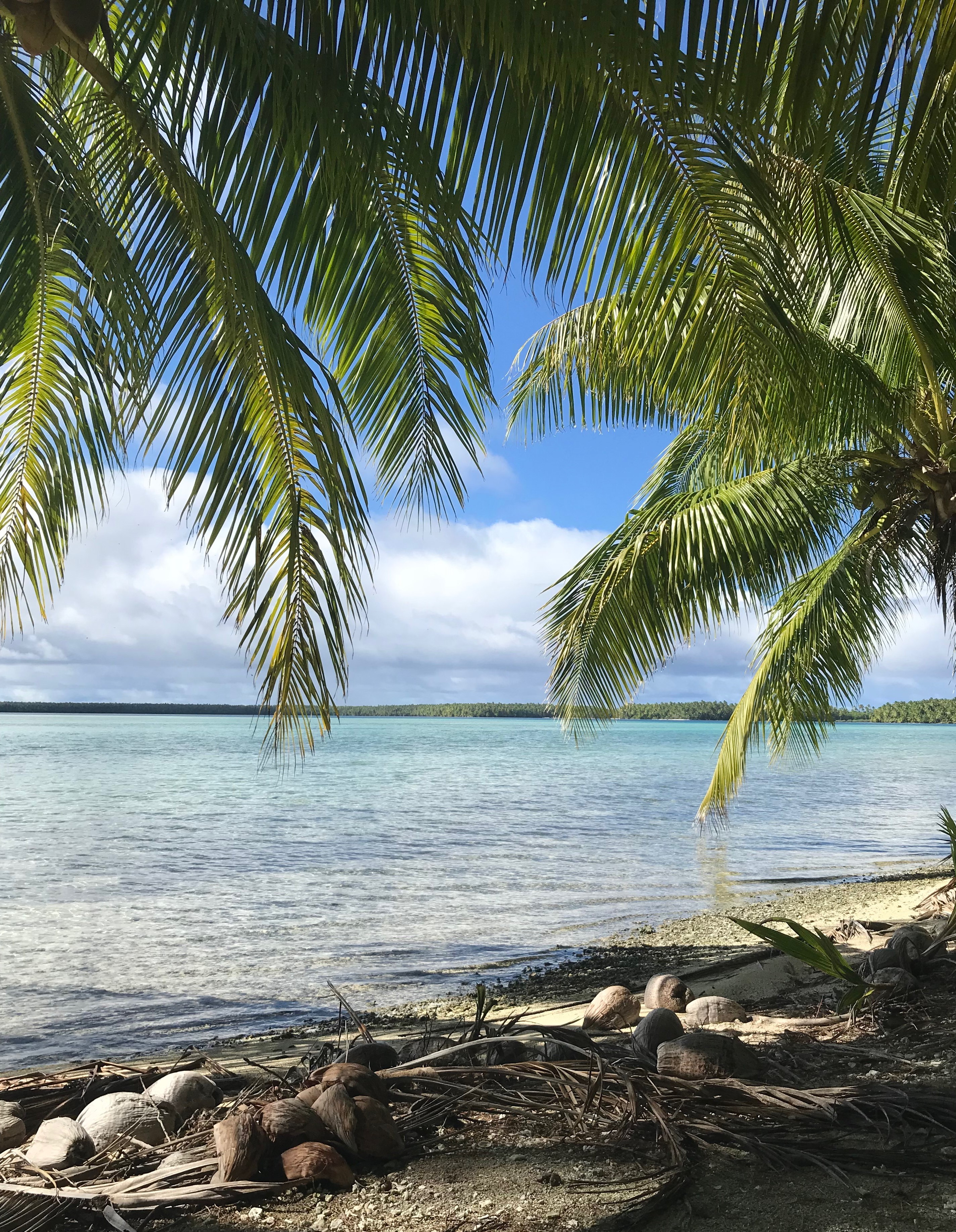
Looking across the lagoon from the south east. The foreground shows litter from the palms.

== Climate ==
Rakahanga has a uniform temperature pattern with daily variations ranging from a minimum of 26 °C/ 79 °F to a maximum about 31 °C/88^{o} F. It is generally dry between May and October and hot and humid between November and April . The latter period is the cyclone (hurricane) season, although such events are relatively rare. It is dryer in La Niña cycles, when water shortages can be acute.

== History ==
=== Maori settlement ===
Rakahanga was first inhabited about 1350 AD. According to oral histories, the original population descended from just two people. Toa was a defeated warrior banished from Rarotonga, and his wife Tapairu was either the sister or the daughter of a Rarotongan chief. She may have been the one with the navigational skills to locate the tiny atoll, which some accounts claim was discovered by her brother Huku. The couple settled on the motu of Te Kainga, near the south west entrance to the lagoon.

Genealogy histories show Toa and Tapairu had four daughters. Toa married each of these daughters in an attempt to produce a male child. Finally, a union with a grand-daughter produced a son, and the youngest daughter produced another boy. Parent-child marriages appear to have been banned after that. Rakahanga was isolated from wars and infectious diseases, and the population grew rapidly. By the sixth generation, the community had split into two tribes under separate arikis (chiefs) and a tuha whenua (Land Distributor) was appointed to arbitrate disputes. By the ninth generation there were four tribal groups, still based around two ariki.

Despite dividing into tribes, there are no records of wars. Te Kainga remained the only site of habitation in Rakahanga. Pearl shell was plentiful there, used in tools such as saws, chisels and fishhooks. The rest of the atoll was reserved for food production, primarily based on the coconut palm, pandanus and puraka, a type of taro.

The population eventually outstripped the food supply. This led to the practice of moving between Rakahanga and the larger but less fertile atoll of Manihiki, which was previously uninhabited. Every few years the entire community would make the dangerous inter-atoll crossing, allowing the vacated atoll to restore. When on Manihiki, the tribal groupings lived on separate motus under their ariki in villages called Tauhuna and Tukoa.

=== Contact with Europeans ===
It is believed that Ferdinand Magellan encountered Rakahanga in 1521, but this cannot be substantiated by historians who have researched the island's history. One of the last great Spanish voyages of exploration, under the command of Pedro Fernandes de Queirós, came upon the island on 2 March 1606. He noted in a record of the voyage: "The land is divided among many owners, and is planted with certain roots, which must form their bread. All the rest is a large and thick palm grove which is the chief sustenance of the natives. Some 500 inhabitants were seen assembled on the beach". A Franciscan friar, Fray Martin de Munilla, was so struck with admiration that he called it the island of beautiful people (gente hermosa). De Quiros described the inhabitants as "the most beautiful white and elegant people that were met during the voyage".

Russian oceanic explorer Fabian Gottlieb von Bellingshausen visited Rakahanga on 8 August 1820, on ships Vostok and Mirni. He took its coordinates and charted its position with accuracy; he named this atoll "Grand Duke Alexander Island", after Grand Duke Alexander Nikolaievich who would later become tsar Alexander II. According to Bellingshausen: "The inhabitants (of Rakahanga) came out in canoes and challenged us to fight by throwing stones and spears at the ship."

"The density of its cocoanut [sic] groves has excited the astonishment of all mariners who have visited it," according to a report written in 1874.

=== Missionary period ===
In 1849 two missionaries came to Manihiki, and then on to Rakahanga. Tairi was from Rarotonga, and Apolo was from Aitutaki, and they were sent by the London Missionary Society which sought to spread the Scriptures using the vernacular. Within a few years most of the population had been baptised and given new names. In 1855, a visiting Rarotongan missionary, Maretu, was concerned at the loss of life on the ocean voyages between the atolls, and decided part of the population should live permanently on Rakahanga and the remainder stay on Manihiki. Maretu wrote that the people "all raised their hands in agreement. That's how it was agreed that the two islands would live separately. The people went home in great joy". Rakahanga’s population then became about 500. Maretu also asked that the settlement be moved from Te Kainga to its present location so it could be set out "in an orderly pattern".

London Missionary Society practice was to set up schools to teach reading and writing based on the Bible. The schools established on Rakahanga and Manihiki taught the alphabet that missionaries had created for the Rarotongan language, which has two fewer consonant sounds than Rakahangan/Manihikian.

The missionaries quickly came to control almost all aspects of island life, although the ariki were still nominally chiefs. Frederick Moss visited Manihiki in about 1886 and observed, "The king, be it said, has no direct power. That has fallen into the hands of the native missionaries whose holy office, combined with greater education and experience, makes him the real ruler of the people." Heads of households elected representatives called Turimen, who "decide the law, sit as judges and act as policemen", but according to Moss, "The native missionary pulls the wires." Games and dances were "rigidly repressed by missionary law," and sinners were punished with fines and by being put in stocks for days at a time. The missionaries had to counter the influence of European traders, who sold alcohol and tobacco along with general merchandise in return for pearl shell, copra and the fine rito mats for which Rakahanga/Manihiki was already famous.

=== British protectorate and incorporation into New Zealand ===
Commander Clarke of HMS Espiegle declared Rakahanga and Manihiki British protectorates on 9 August 1889, almost a year after the islands in the Southern Group. The British appointed as the Cooks Islands chief administrator a New Zealand MP, Frederick Moss, However, the 'parliament' he formed only had representatives from the Southern Group. Being under the protection of the British appears to have meant little in practice for Rakahanga.

The London Missionary Society's control of Rakahanga ended when both the Northern and Southern Groups were included within New Zealand's boundaries in 1901 with the support of the ariki provided they could approve which NZ laws would apply. Island Councils were established on major islands, including Rakahanga, with Resident Agents who reported to the Resident Commissioner in Rarotonga. The Rakahanga Resident Agent in 1903 was a teacher at the missionary school. After visiting the atoll in 1904, the Resident Commissioner reported, "On Rakahanga there is evidence of very bad feeling, and many land disputes." He suggested this was due to over-officiousness on the part of the Rakahanga Island Council.

The New Zealand Government slowly improved the infrastructure, for example installing a large concrete water tank in 1912 and a Courthouse in 1917. Medical officers called in every six months or so. A government school was not established until 1951, after the islanders had built a teacher's house. The school taught from kindergarten to Year 10, following a New Zealand curriculum for what were termed Maori schools. English was compulsory, although the teachers were not necessarily fluent speakers.

=== Self rule 1965 ===
Rakahanga was established as a single electorate when the Cook Islands became self-governing in 1965. Pupuke Robati was the first elected representative. One ariki initially represented both Rakahanga and Manihiki in the House of Ariki because it was claimed that there had been no ariki on Rakahanga since 1901. Robati disputed this, saying there were two ariki families. Robati became Prime Minister briefly in 1987. His daughter Tina Pupuke Browne, leader of the Cook Islands Democratic Party, gained the seat following a legal challenge after the 2018 elections.

Rakahanga's political candidates have often resided outside Rakahanga when elected, including Pupuke Robati. However, voters can only be registered if they have lived in the electorate for at least 3 months before an election. This condition led to an electoral challenge to the Rakahanga election result in 2010.

With EU and New Zealand funding, 100% solar generated power was made available to all residents in 2014, and new roofing, guttering and water tanks have been installed on all occupied houses. Mobile telecommunications were provided in 2007 and upgraded in 2013.

The island was claimed under the Guano Islands Act for the United States, a claim which was only ceded in a treaty between the U.S. and the Cook Islands in 1980.

== Flora and fauna ==
The atoll is a green sea turtle nesting site. Coconut crabs are protected and their harvesting is constrained to certain seasons. The outer reef is a good fishing spot. Each January, a tuna fishing contest takes place and boats return with 200 or more fish a day. Humpback whales have been confirmed on rare occasions.

Colonies of white terns nest along the lagoon. Frigate birds and brown boobies are other common sea birds. Feral cats and rats were introduced by Europeans. Pigs and poultry are farmed and also exist in feral populations. Dogs are prohibited on the atoll.

Indigenous ngangie and toa trees are found all over on the islets. Coconut palm trees are predominate, however, and their fruit are rarely collected nowadays. Large breadfruit trees line village paths and pandanus trees thrive. Since the 1997 cyclone, an invasive burr weed (probably of the species soliva sessilis) has become increasingly prevalent.

== People and culture ==
=== Religion ===
==== Maori ====
Polynesian believed gods had a physical manifestation. No gods appear to have been brought by Toa and Tapairu when they settled on Rakahanga, and it took seven generations (about 150 years) before some travellers returned with two gods. Later, a piece of red wood washed up which was believed to be a third god. Paved areas called maraes were constructed outside the villages for religious gatherings. Minor prohibitions were practiced to avoid displeasing the gods, such as dietary restrictions related to protecting species of significance to a tribal group.

==== London Missionary Society/Cook Islands Christian Church ====
In 1849 a whaling ship rescued some Rakahangan/Manihikian castaways and deposited them on the distant island of Aitutaki. The London Missionary Society took the opportunity of returning them, accompanied by two missionaries. Six years later, according to the missionary Maretu: "At that time some people still worshipped the frigate bird and a species of land crab. They now realised they were useless. They discarded them and came to [Bible study] class wishing to be accepted later as church members so they would be joined to the vine of life."

A large church was built from coral rock and lime made from soft coral, materials also introduced into house building. The relocated village was arranged around straight paths of crushed-coral. The missionaries introduced papaya and breadfruit trees, as well as new technologies, including cotton materials and European style boat building techniques. They built the first gaol and policed not only sexual practices but "heathen customs" such as the wearing of earrings.

The London Missionary Society name was dropped around 1960 and the Cook Islands Christian Church became an autonomous entity with an act of the Cook Islands Parliament in 1968. The large white church with its intricate wood carving remains the dominant building on the atoll, and the majority of the population attend at least one service per week.

==== Catholic Church ====
The Roman Catholic religion, although dominant in nearby Tahiti, was not practiced on Rakahanga until 1926. The first priest, Father Joachim Kerdral, oversaw the building of a church and a small priest's house on leased land. A Catholic school was also established, taught by the priest or by ex students. By 1935 a third of the population had converted to Catholicism. Father Joachim left in 1937 and was not replaced permanently until 1955, and then only for four years. The congregation largely returned to the London Missionary Society Church, or became Seventh Day Adventists. Rakahanga's last permanent priest was Father Placido Rovers, who arrived in 1971 and was buried on the island in 1980. The church was rebuilt twice after damage from high seas during cyclones, and is now in ruins.

==== Seventh Day Adventists ====
In 2018, about a quarter of the population were Seventh Day Adventists. Prominent members include Toka Hagai who was twice elected to Parliament.

=== Population ===
Historical population
Year	Pop.	±%
1906	352	—
1916	295	−16.2%
1926	327	+10.8%
1936	290	−11.3%
1951	261	−10.0%
1961	319	+22.2%
1966	323	+1.3%
1976	283	−12.4%
1986	282	−0.4%
1996	249	−11.7%
2001	169	−32.1%
2006	141	−16.6%
2011	77	−45.4%
2016	83	+7.8%
2021	81	−2.4%

Between 800 and 1200 people lived on Rakahanga and Manihiki when the missionaries arrived in 1849. Rakahanga had about 400 residents during the missionary period until 1901. A 1916 decrease in population was caused by migration to Rarotonga in search of employment. Since the last half of the 20th century there has been a continued decline through migration to Rarotonga, New Zealand and to a lesser extent, Australia.

The number of residents varies as families may migrate temporarily. A survey in 2011 counted 79 residents on the island whereas one in 2012 counted 102. In 2018 there were 61 people on the electoral roll and 83 people in the 2016 Census (down from 127 in the 2008 Census). The government school, which opened in 1951 for all students up to Year 10, has an enrolment of less than 20.

=== Culture ===
Chants, stories, drumming and dance were central to Rakahangan/Manihikian culture. An early 20th century visitor claimed that dancing was the peoples' "chief reason for existing," and described them as the most accomplished singers and dancers "in the whole South Pacific".

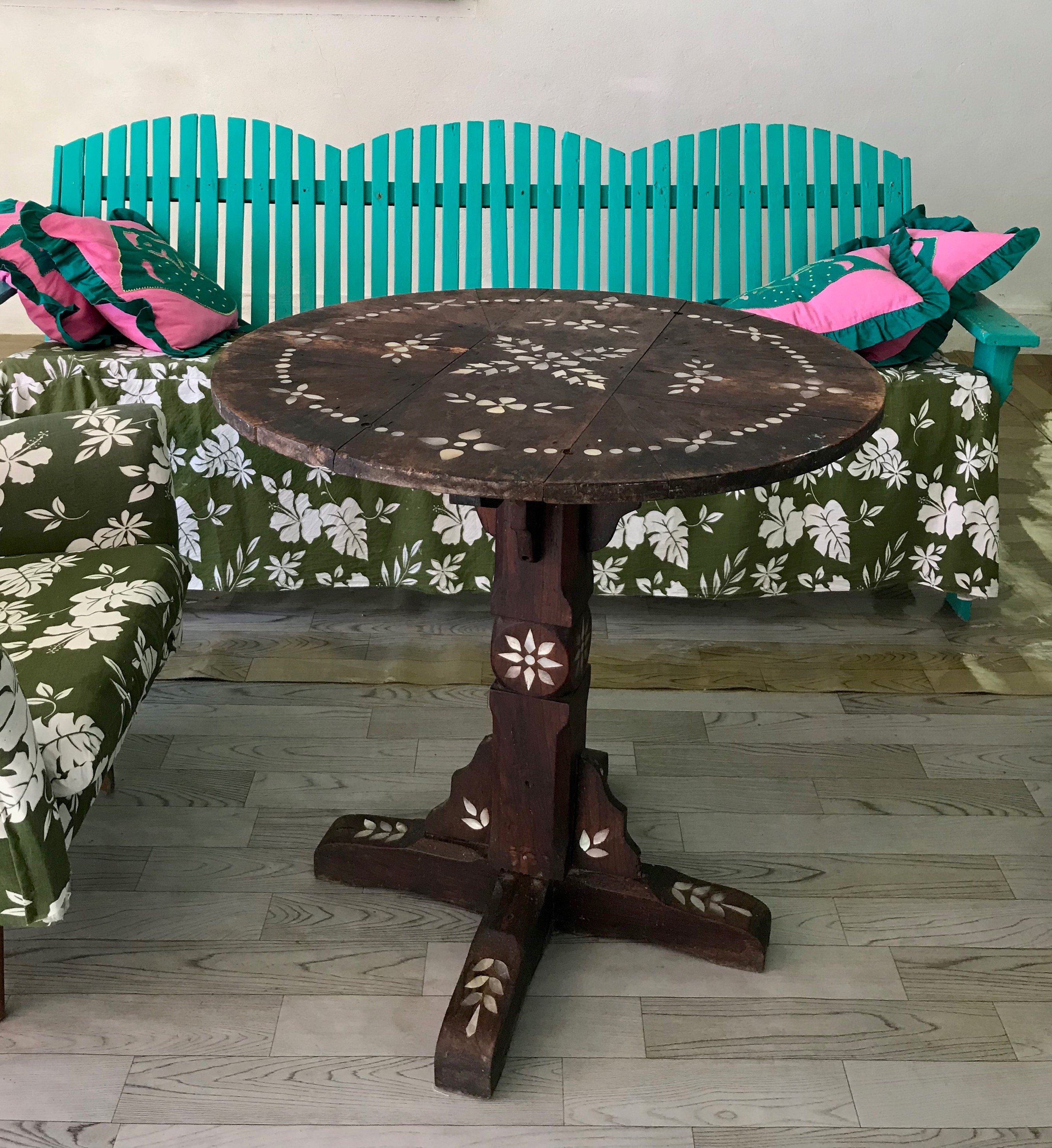
Pearl inlay decorates this early 20th century table. Its top is constructed from packing case planking. Behind is a typical mid 20th century home-made couch and cushions. The applique embroidery style tivaevae was introduced by the missionaries.

Inlay pearl shell inlays decorated traditional double canoes. The Cook Islands Christian Church has many examples of this fine inlay work that was used to decorate furniture.

=== Tribes ===
The atoll is populated by two Whakaheo tribes, the Matakeinanga and Tukuwhare. Each one has 7 subtribes, divided in 7 groups:

Matakeinanga	Tukuwhare
Nu-matua	Te-pu-tauhunu; Purenga; Kaupapa; Hitiki; Popo-iti; Nga-hoe-e-wha; Whati-kaua
Tia-ngaro-Tonga	Wai-a-Matua; Ngaro-Tapaha; Nga-whare-ririki; Tuteru-matua; Tianewa-matua; Tihauma; Hua-tane

== Economy ==
Until recently, the economy of Rakahanga was dominated by the coconut palm. Prior to European economic involvement, coconut palms were valuable property, to be passed down to families along with land. Every part of the palm had a role, as a food, building material, clothing material, fuel, or for making baskets and netting.

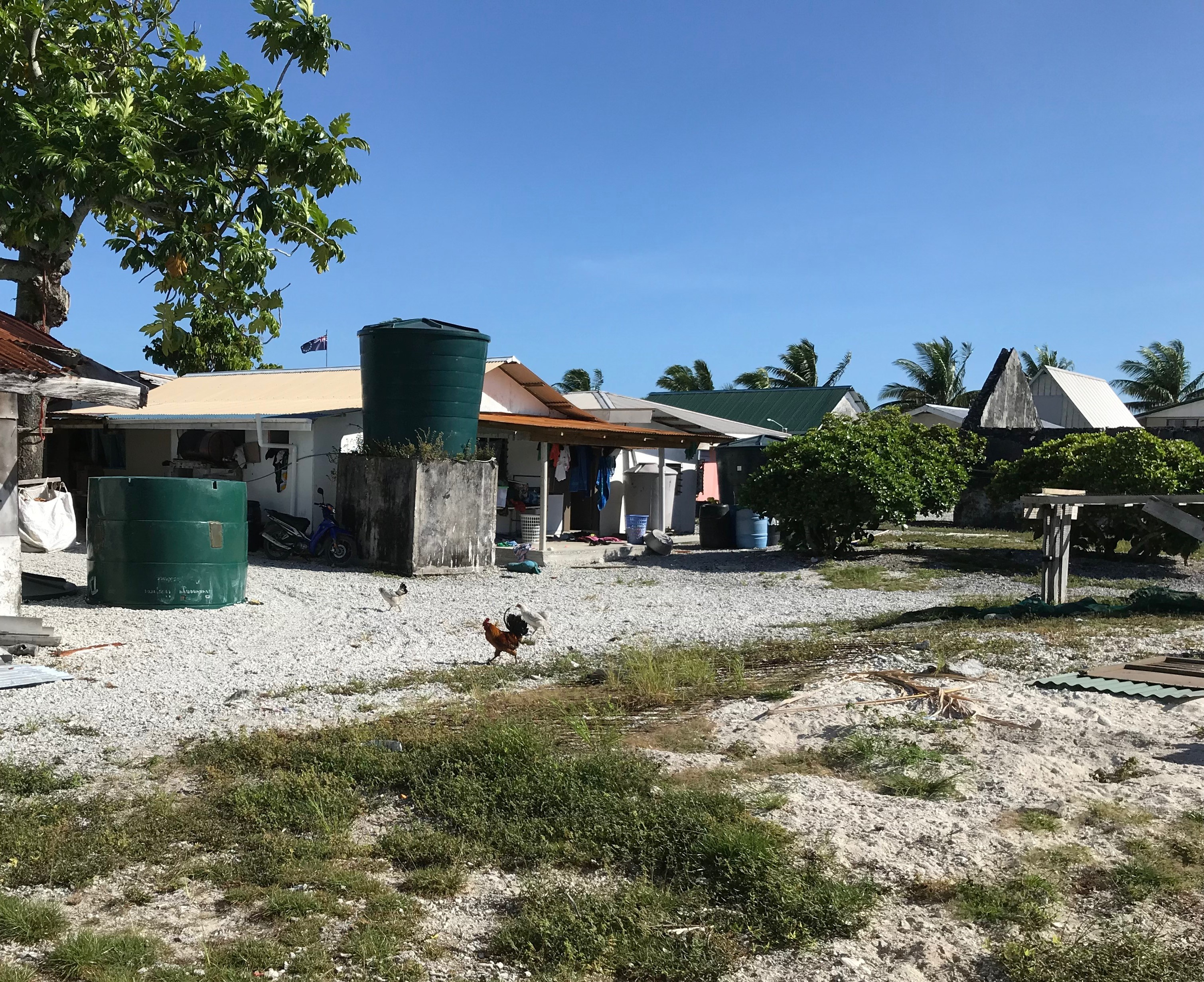
Large water tanks are fitted to all occupied houses which have also been reroofed under the Rain Water Harvesting Project. Weed encroachments are visible in the foreground. A large breadfruit tree is to the left.

Visiting trading ships brought the first need for tradeable goods. Pearl shell and copra (dried coconut meat, a source of coconut oil) could be exchanged for manufactured goods which were largely sourced from New Zealand. By the 1890s European traders were living on Rakahanga, buying copra and selling general merchandise. By 1904 the Island Council had ownership interests in at least one trading store. In the 1930s the major store belonged to the New Zealand trading firm of A. B. Donald, which also owned schooners to transport the copra. This store operated until the 1970s. In the second half of the twentieth century the international copra market declined and the price dropped to almost a quarter, making the Rakahangan industry unviable. In 2001 90% of those employed were in the public sector.

Dried fish are a potential export. Rito hats, mats and baskets, traditionally woven by women from the ribs of coconut leaves, remain in demand in Rarotongan markets because of their high quality. These are made using the same techniques which in 1874 were described as producing "highly prized" mats "in the manufacture of which they are more skilful than any other people of the Pacific".

In the 1950s and again in the 1990s attempts were made to establish a pearl industry . However, the lagoon is shallow with poor water flow. Some Rakahangans benefit from the black pearl industry in Manihiki through part-ownership or employment.

There is no tourist accommodation on Rakahanga although homestays can be arranged. Access to the atoll remains very difficult. AirRaro offers fortnightly (usually) flights between Rarotonga to Manihiki. Both the Manihiki and Rakahanga communities operate outboard motor boats between the atolls, a trip which takes up to 3 hours depending on conditions. The alternative is a 3–6 day voyage on one of the trading ships which run on sparse schedules from Rarotonga or sometimes Tahiti. An airstrip built on Rakahanga's western coast in 1982 was damaged beyond repair by waves in the next cyclone

== People and events ==
Julian Dashwood, writing under the name Julian Hillas, lived on Rakahanga in the mid1930s and was briefly married to an islander, Tupou. At least one of his articles about Rakahanga was published. The novel he wrote while on the atoll, White Natives, was never published, although an account of his stay is in his autobiography.

Rakahanga gained international attention when a raft on a Kon-Tiki like expedition led by Frenchman Eric de Bisschop smashed on the reef in 1958. de Bisschop was killed and buried on the atoll. A few weeks later a French naval group retrieved the body which was reburied with honours in Tahiti.

Pupuke Rabati was prime minister of the Cook Islands from 1987 to 1989.

== See also ==
- About the island "where tomorrow never comes"
- Rakahanga through a visitor's eyes
- List of Guano Island claims
- Rakahanga (Cook Islands electorate)
- Rakahanga-Manihiki language
