= Rakahanga-Manihiki language =

Tahitic language of Rakahanga and Manihiki

Rakahanga-Manihiki
- Native to: Cook Islands
- Region: Rakahanga and Manihiki islands
- Native speakers: 320 in the Cook Islands (2011 census); 2,500 in New Zealand, based on a cited population of 5,000 (1981) being half in Cook Islands and half in New Zealand
- Language family: Austronesian: Malayo-Polynesian; Oceanic; Polynesian; Eastern Polynesian; Tahitic; Rakahanga-Manihiki

Official status
- Official language in: Cook Islands
- Regulated by: Kopapa Reo

Language codes
- ISO 639-3: rkh
- Glottolog: raka1237
- ELP: Rakahanga-Manihiki
- Manihiki is classified as Definitely Endangered by the UNESCO Atlas of the World's Languages in Danger.

Rakahanga-Manihiki is a Tahitic language belonging to the Polynesian language family, spoken by about 2500 people on Rakahanga and Manihiki Islands (part of the Cook Islands) and another 2500 in other countries, mostly New Zealand and Australia. Wurm and Hattori consider Rakahanga-Manihiki as a distinct language with "limited intelligibility with Rarotongan" (i.e. the Cook Islands Maori dialectal variant of Rarotonga). According to the New Zealand Maori anthropologist Te Rangi Hīroa who spent a few days on Rakahanga in the years 1920, "the language is a pleasing dialect and has closer affinities with [New Zealand] Maori than with the dialects of Tongareva, Tahiti, and the Cook Islands"

== History ==
Rakahanga and Manihiki are two different islands but the culture is one. They are two islands 25 miles apart from each other and are located in the South Pacific. The island of Rakahanga was discovered in the year 1521 by Ferdinand Magellan, a Portuguese voyager sailing under Spain under the command of Pedro Fernandes. The two islands were divided into different groups, which were ruled by other rulers. The people of Manihiki and Rakahanga were led by one ruler, a chief, in which he was separated from his community giving up his ritual and economic powers. The people of the two islands organized into “moieties” (one senior and one junior), which both were divided to create four sub-moieties. Twenty-five households were established. The Polynesians not only lived on the islands but also Rarotonga. They migrated to other places like New Zealand and Australia leaving 400 people on the Rakahanga and Manihiki islands. When migrating, they would travel by ship or boat to other islands finding a place to settle. The population moved from one island to another due depleted coconut and paraka supplies. The people would use the Magellan clouds, also known as Na Mahu as guides to get between the two islands. They dedicate themselves to their religious beliefs but also carry on their traditions with culture and language.

As of 1998, the population in Rakahanga was 276 and the population in Manihiki was 505.

As years went by, technology advanced to another level in which high frequency radios have been invented and used for inter-island communication between the island of Rakahanga for medical and educational purposes. Telecom Cook Islands holds the rights of the medical and educational frequencies linked to the Cook Islands for outer-island communication. Telecom Cook Islands is the sole provider of telephone services in the Cook Islands. The 13 inhabited islands except Rakahanga have a satellite earth station, which enables communication on the island by telephone, email, and Internet. Rakahanga consumes telephone and facsimile services that can be possible by the High Frequency radio link. The Cook Island black pearl industry is centred in Manihiki.

== The language ==
The Manihiki-Rakahanga dialect is much closer to Māori than the dialects of Tahiti, Tongareva, and the Cook Islands, although each of the Cook Islands has (or had at one time) a somewhat distinct dialect to the others. The alphabet adopted for Rarotonga was introduced by native pastors, who were educated by the London Missionary Society. When using H instead of S and WH instead of H. In Tahitian, in retaining K and NG and using WH and a more sounded H. It is shared by the Maori dialect. The consonants that are not presented are H and WH, and the v should be W. The H and Wh sounds have no letters to represent them. An official interpreter to the Cook Islands Administration, Stephen Savage holds that the w should have been embraced for the Rarotongan dialect instead of v. With teaching the alphabetical sounds, the tendency is for the children to adopt and study the v sounds. The Europeans have omitted the obvious H sound in Rakahanga by writing in print “Rakaanga.” The people of the Manihiki Island pronounce their island “Manihiki” but write it Maniiki because the people are taught when learning the alphabet to not include the H. The word hala was influenced by Tahiti, where the sound exists as an F and is pronounced as “fara”. It became evident that the sound was not the Tahitian F but was influenced with the Maori WH sound. The H and Wh have been used in words in which they are sounded. The word Huku variously written as “Iku,” “Hiku,” and “Huku”. Huku who is a human discoverer sailed from Rarotonga on a fishing expedition. Huku is to be believed by the people of the Rakahanga and Manihiki islands which Huku is stated to have sailed from Rarotonga on a fishing expedition.

== Phonology ==
Manihiki has a rather standard Cook Islands Māori inventory, but is notable for not having any sibilant fricatives.

=== Consonants ===
	Labial	Alveolar	Velar	Glottal
Nasal	m	n	ŋ	
Plosive	p	t	k	ʔ
Fricative	f v			h
Approximant		r		

This is similar to Tongareva's phonology, but Manihiki has a glottal stop [ʔ], and the fricative [f]. Tongareva also has [s], which Manihiki lacks it.

=== Vowels ===
Vowel inventory
	Front		Central		Back	
	short	long	short	long	short	long
High	i	iː			u	uː
Mid	e	eː			o	oː
Low			a	aː		

This vowel system is also typical of many Polynesian languages. Long vowels are romanized with a macron.

== Alphabet ==
A, E, F, H, I, K, M, N, Ng, O, P, R, T, U, V

Vowels a, e, i, o, and u. Consonants k, m, n, ng, p, r, t, and v.

== Indicative bibliography ==
- Manihikian Traditional Narratives: In English and Manihikian: Stories of the Cook Islands (Na fakahiti o Manihiki). Papatoetoe, New Zealand: Te Ropu Kahurangi. 1988.
- E au tuatua ta'ito no Manihiki, Kauraka Kauraka, IPS, USP, Suva. 1987.
- "No te kapuaanga o te enua nei ko Manihiki (The Origin of the Island of Manihiki)". JPS. 24: 140–144. 1915.
- Olesen, Aslak Vaag (2020). A Grammar of the Manihiki language (Master's thesis). University of Newcastle. hdl:1959.13/1418252.
