= Tetukono =

Coordinates: 9°59′59.98″S 161°5′7.88″W

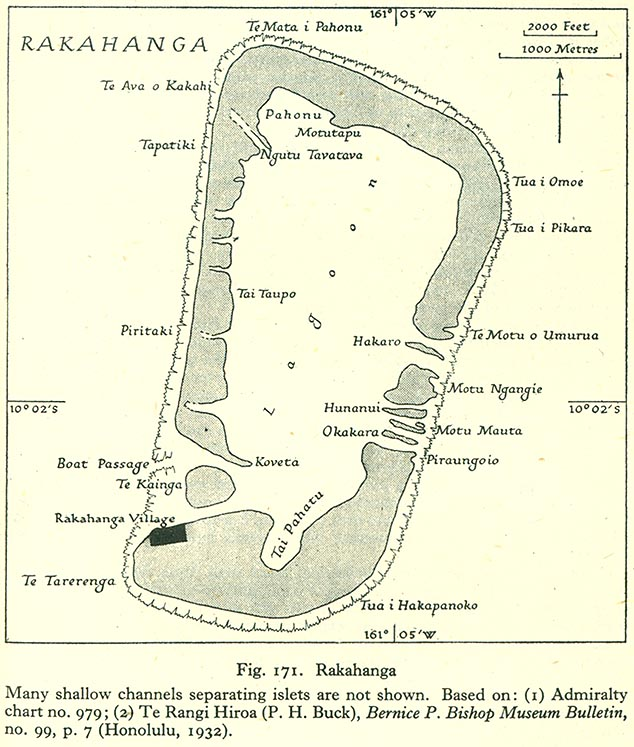
Map of Rakahanga Atoll

Tetukono is one of 11 islands in the Rakahanga atoll of the Cook Islands. It makes up the northern and northeastern edges of the atoll, and is between the islands of Tetaha Kiraro and Akaro.
