= Kauraka Kauraka =

Cook Islands poet (1951–1997)

Kauraka Kauraka (5 September 1951 – 1997) was a Cook Islands writer. He was born in Avatiu on Rarotonga, the main island of the Cooks, and educated at the University of the South Pacific in Suva, Fiji, and the University of Hawaiʻi at Mānoa. He published six collections of poems in the English and Rarotongan languages. When Kauraka died in 1997, he was buried on the atoll of Manihiki, northern Cooks. He was the brother of artist and writer Tepaeru Tereora.

== Bibliography ==
- Taku Akatauira = My Dawning Star, IPS, USP, Suva, 1999.
- Manakonako : Reflections, IPS, USP, 1992.
- E au tuatua Ta'ito no Manihiki, IPS, USP, Suva, 1987.
- Dreams of the Rainbow : Moemoea a te Anuanua, Mana Publications, Suva, 1987.
- Return to Hawaiki, IPS, USP, Suva, 1980
