= Cook Islands Māori =

Polynesian language of the Cook Islands

- Māori, Maori Kuki Airani, Māori Kūki ʻĀirani
- Native to: Cook Islands, New Zealand
- Region: Polynesia
- Native speakers: 13,620 in Cook Islands, 96% of ethnic population (2011 census); 7,725 in New Zealand, 12% of ethnic population (2013)
- Language family: Austronesian: Malayo-Polynesian; Oceanic; Polynesian; Eastern Polynesian; Tahitic; Cook Islands Māori
- Early forms: Proto-Austronesian: Proto-Malayo-Polynesian; Proto-Oceanic; Proto-Polynesian; Proto-Tahitic; Old Cook Islands Māori
- Standard forms: Standard Cook Islands Māori
- Dialects: Rarotonga; Aitutaki; Mangaia; Ngāputoru; Manihiki; Tongareva

Official status
- Official language in: Cook Islands
- Regulated by: Te Kopapa Reo Maori (Maori Language Commission)

Language codes
- ISO 639-2: rar
- ISO 639-3: Variously: rar – Rarotonga pnh – Tongareva (Penrhyn) rkh – Rakahanga-Manihiki
- Glottolog: raro1241 Southern Cook Island Maori penr1237 Māngarongaro raka1237 Rakahanga-Manihiki
- ELP: Southern Cook Islands Maori
- IETF: rar-CK mi-CK
- Cook Islands Māori is classified as Vulnerable by the UNESCO Atlas of the World's Languages in Danger

Cook Islands Māori is an Eastern Polynesian language that is an official language of the Cook Islands. It is closely related to, but distinct from, New Zealand Māori. Cook Islands Māori is called just Māori when there is no need to distinguish it from New Zealand Māori. It is also known as Māori Kūki ʻĀirani (or Maori Kuki Airani), or as Rarotongan. Many Cook Islanders also call it Te Reo Ipukarea, which translates as 'the language of the ancestral homeland'.

== Dialects ==
Although most words of the various dialects of Cook Islands Māori are identical, there are some differences.

Rarotonga	Aitutaki	Mangaia	Ngāputoru	Manihiki	Tongareva	English
tuatua	ʻautara	taratara	araara	vananga	akaiti	speak, speech
ʻānau		ʻānau	ʻānau	fanau	hanau	Birth, offspring (c.f. Kopu tangata for family)
kūmara	kūʻara	kūʻara	kūmara	kūmara	kumala	sweet potato
kāre	kāʻore, ʻāʻore	eʻi, ʻāore	ʻāita, kāre	kaua, kāre	kore	no, not
tātā	kiriti	tātā	tātā	tātā	tata	write
ʻura	koni	ʻura	ʻingo, oriori, ʻura	hupahupa	kosaki	dance
ʻakaipoipo	ʻakaipoipo	ʻāʻāipoipo	ʻakaipoipo	fakaipoipo	selenga	wedding
ʻīkoke	koroio	rakiki	tūngāngā	hikoke	mokisi	thin
ʻare	ʻare	ʻare	ʻare	fare	hare	house
maʻata	ʻatupaka	ngao	nui, nunui, ranuinui	kore reka	polia	big
matū, pete	ngenengene	pori	poripori	menemene	suesue	fat

== Demographics ==
Place	Number of speakers
Cook Islands	13,620
New Zealand	7,725
New South Wales	1,612
Queensland	1,609
Victoria	1,468
Western Australia	308
South Australia	63
Australian Capital Territory	28
Northern Territory	21
Tasmania	10

== Official status ==
English is an official language of the Cook Islands, and Cook Islands Māori became an official language also in 2003, as defined by the Te Reo Maori Act 2003.

The Te Reo Maori Act states that Māori:

1. means the Māori language (including its various dialects) as spoken or written in any island of the Cook Islands; and
2. Is deemed to include Pukapukan as spoken or written in Pukapuka; and
3. Includes Māori that conforms to the national standard for Māori approved by Kopapa Reo.

== Phonology ==
Consonants
	Labial	Alveolar	Velar	Glottal
Nasal	m	n	ŋ	
Plosive	p	t	k	ʔ ⟨ʻ⟩
Tap		ɾ		
Fricative	f (Note: Present only in Manihiki) v	s (Note: Present only in Penrhyn)		h (Note: Present only in Manihiki and Penrhyn)

Vowel inventory
	Front		Central		Back	
	short	long	short	long	short	long
High	i	iː ⟨ī⟩			u	uː ⟨ū⟩
Mid	e	eː ⟨ē⟩			o	oː ⟨ō⟩
Low			a	aː ⟨ā⟩		

== Writing system ==
There is a debate about the standardisation of the writing system. Although usage of the macron (־) makarona and the glottal stop (ʻ) amata is recommended, most speakers do not use them in everyday writing. The Cook Islands Māori Revised New Testament uses a standardised orthography that includes the ʻokina and macron.

== Grammar ==
Cook Islands Māori is an isolating language with very little morphology. Case is marked by the particle that initiates a noun phrase, and like most East Polynesian languages, Cook Islands Māori has nominative-accusative case marking.

The unmarked constituent order is predicate initial: that is, verb initial in verbal sentences and nominal-predicate initial in non-verbal sentences.

=== Personal pronouns ===
Person	Singular	Dual	Plural
1st inclusive	au	tāua	tātou^{1}
1st exclusive	au	māua	mātou^{2}
2nd	koe	kōrua	kōtou
3rd	aia	rāua	rātou

1. you -2 or more- and I
2. they and I

Singular pronoun examples
Pronoun	Cook Islands Maori	English	Word-to-word and gloss
au	Ka ʻaere au ki te ʻāpiʻi āpōpō	I'm going to school tomorrow.	(unaccomplished asp.)/ go / I / (prep. goal/destination) / the / learn / tomorrow
au	Ka ʻārote au inanaʻi, nō te ua rā, kua ʻakakore au	I was going to do the ploughing yesterday, but gave it up because of the rain.	(unaccomplished asp.) / plough / I / yesterday / because (origin) / the / rain / day /(perfect asp.) / give up (litt. "do nothing") /I
koe	Kua kino iā koe tō mātou mōtokā	You damaged our car.	(perfect asp.) / bad / by / you /(possession)/we (exclusive) /car
koe	Ko koe ʻoki, te tangata tā te ʻakavā e kimi nei	You are the person the police are looking for.	(subject marker) / you / also / the / man / (possession) / the / police / (progressive asp. with "nei") /look for/here and now.
aia	ʻEaʻa ʻaia i ʻaere mai ei	Why did he/she come?	why (ʻeaʻa... ei) / he or she / (accomplished asp) / go / towards me /
aia	Kāre ʻaia i konei	He/she is not here.	(negation asp.) / he or she / (marking position) / here

Dual pronoun examples
Pronoun	Cook Islands Maori	English	Word-to-word and gloss
Tāua	ʻaere tāua !	Let us go!	go / we two (inclusive)
Tāua	Ko tō tāua taeake tērā ake	Here come our friends.	(subject marker) / (possession) / we two (inclusive) / friend or relative of the same generation (brother, sister, cousin either sex) speaking, but not in laws./ that (deictic)/ a little time (or distance)away
we two, us two (he/she and I)	Ka ʻoki māua ko Taria ki te kāinga	Taria and I are going back home.	(unaccomplished asp.)/ return / we two (exclusive) / with / Taria/ (prep. goal)/ the / home
we two, us two (he/she and I)	To tāua taeake tērā ake	Here come our friends.	(subject marker) / possession / we two (exclusive) / friend / that (deictic)/ a little time (or distance away)
Kōrua : you two	ʻāe ! kua rongo kōrua i te nūti!	Hey! Have you heard the news?	hey (interj) / (perfect asp.) / hear / you two / (object marker) / the / news /
Kōrua : you two	Na kōrua teia puka	This book belongs to you two.	(Possession) / you two / this (deictic) / book
Rāua : they, them (the two of them)	Tuatua muna tēia, ka akakite ʻua atu au kia rāua	This is a confidential matter, I shall only tell it to those two.	speak, speech / secret / this / (unaccomplished asp.) / reveal (make known) / only / away (from the speaker)/ I / (prep. ki+a)towards (someone)/ they two
Rāua : they, them (the two of them)	No ʻea mai rāua ?	Where have the two of them been? / What have they been doing?	from / (time and space interr.) / (indicating progression of time towards present) / they two

Plural pronoun examples
Pronoun	Cook Islands Maori	English	Word-to-word and gloss
Tātou : We, us (you -2 or more- and I)	Koʻai tā tātou e tiaki nei	Who are we waiting for?	Who (subject marker+identity interr.) / (possession) / we, all of us (inclusive) / (progressive asp.) / wait for / here and now
Tātou : We, us (you -2 or more- and I)	Kāre ā tātou kai toe	We have no more food.	(Negation asp.) / (possession) / we, all of us (inclusive) / eat, food / remain, remaining, the rest
Mātou : we, us (they and I)	Ko mātou ma Tere mā i ʻaere mai ei	We came with Tere and the others.	(subject marker)/ we (exclusive) / with, and / Tere / (part used only after persons meaning those in company with / (accomplisshed asp.) / go / (movement towards speaker) / (emphasis marks)
Mātou : we, us (they and I)	Kua kite mai koe ia mātou	You saw us.	(perfect asp.) / see(towards speaker) / you / at someone (i+a) / we (exclusive)
Kōtou : (all of you)	E ʻaere atu kōtou, ka āru atu au	You go on, and I'll follow.	(imperative asp.)/ go / (away from the speaker) / you all / (unaccomplished asp.) / follow / go / (away from the speaker) / I
Kōtou : (all of you)	Ko kōtou koʻai mā i aere ei ki te tautai?	Who did you go fishing with?	(Subject marker) / you all / who (identity interr.) / in company with / (accomplished asp.) / go / (emphasis) / (goal/destination) / the / fishing
Rātou : they, them (more than two)	Kua pekapeka rātou ko Tere	They and Tere have quarrelled.	(perfect asp.)/ trouble / they all / (subject marker)/ Tere
Rātou : they, them (more than two)	Nō rātou te pupu māroʻiroʻi	They have the strongest team.	(Possession) / they all / the / team (litt. group of people) / strong

=== Tense–Aspect–Mood markers ===
Tē... nei: present continuous

- Tē manako nei au i te ʻoki ki te ʻare : I am thinking of going back to the house
- Tē kata nei rātou : They are laughing
- Kāre au e tanu nei i te pia : I'm not planting any arrowroot

Kia: mildly imperative or exhortatory, expressing a desire, a wish rather than a strong command.

- Kia vave mai! : be quick! (don't be long!)
- Kia viviki mai! : be quick (don't dawdle!)
- Kia manuia! : good luck!
- Kia rave ana koe i tēnā ʻangaʻanga : would you do that job
- Kia tae mai ki te angaʻanga ā te pōpongi Mōnitē : come to work on Monday morning
- Teia te tātāpaka, kia kai koe : Here's the breadfruit pudding, eat up

e: Imperative, order

- e ʻeke koe ki raro : you get down
- e tū ki kō : stand over there

Auraka: interdiction, don't

- Auraka rava koe e ʻāmiri i tēia niuniu ora, ka ʻutiʻutiʻia koe : don't on any account touch this live wire, you'll get a shock

kāre: indicate the negation, not, nothing, nowhere

- Kāre nō te ua : It will not rain
- Kāre a Tī tuatua : Tī doesn't have anything to say

e... ana: habitual action or state

- E ʻaere ana koe ki te ʻura : Do you go to the dance?
- E noʻo ana aia ki Nikao i tē reira tuātau : he used to live in Nikao at that time

Ka: refers prospectively to the commencement of an action or state. Often translatable as the English future tense or "going to" construction

- Ka imene a Mere ākonei ite pō : Mary is going to sing later on tonight
- Kua kite au ē ka riri a Tere : I know (or knew) that Tere will (or would) be angry

Kua: translatable as the English simple past or present tense (with adjectives)

- Kua kite mai koe ia mātou : You saw us
- Kua meitaki koe ? : Are you better now?
- Kua oti te tārekareka : the match is over now

Most of the preceding examples were taken from Cook Islands Maori Dictionary, by Jasper Buse with Raututi Taringa edited by Bruce Biggs and Rangi Moekaʻa, Auckland, 1995.

=== Possessives ===
Like most other Polynesian languages (Tahitian, New Zealand Māori, Hawaiian, Samoan, Tongan ...), Cook Islands Māori has two categories of possessives, "a" and "o".

Generally, the "a" category is used when the possessor has or had control over the initiation of the possessive relationship. Usually this means that the possessor is superior or dominant to what is owned, or that the possession is considered as alienable. The "o" category is used when the possessor has or had no control over the initiation of the relationship. This usually means that the possessor is subordinate or inferior to what is owned, or that the possession is considered to be inalienable.

The following list indicates the types of things in the different categories:

- a is used in speaking of
  - Movable property, instruments,
  - Food and drink,
  - Husband, wife, children, grandchildren, girlfriend, boyfriend,
  - Animals and pets, (except for horses)
  - People in an inferior position

Te puaka a tērā vaʻine : the pig belonging to that woman;
ā Tere tamariki : Tere's children;
Kāre ā Tupe mā ika inapō : Tupe and the rest didn't get any fish last night

Tāku; Tāʻau; Tāna; Tā tāua; Tā māua…. : my, mine; your, yours; his, her, hers, our ours…

Ko tāku vaʻine tēia : This is my wife;
Ko tāna tāne tērā : That's her husband;
Tā kotou ʻapinga : your possession(s);
Tā Tare ʻapinga : Tērā possession(s);

- o is used in speaking of
  - Parts of anything
  - Feelings
  - Buildings and transport (including horses)
  - Clothes
  - Parents or other relatives (not husband, wife, children...)
  - Superiors

Te ʻare o Tere : The house belonging to Tere;
ō Tere pare : Tere's hat;
Kāre ō Tina noʻo anga e noʻo ei : Tina hasn't got anywhere to sit;

Tōku; Tōʻou; Tōna; Tō tāua; Tō māua…: my, mine; your, yours; his, her, hers; our, ours …

Ko tōku ʻare tēia : This is my house;
I tōku manako, ka tika tāna : In my opinion, he'll be right;
Tēia tōku, tērā tōʻou : This is mine here, that's yours over there

== Vocabulary ==
- Pia : Polynesian arrowroot
- Kata : laugh at; laughter;
  - kata ʻāviri : ridicule, jeer, mock
- Tanu : to plant, cultivate land
- ʻangaʻanga : work, job
- Pōpongi : morning
- Tātāpaka : a kind of breadfruit pudding
- Tuātau : time, period, season;
  - ē tuātau ʻua atu : forever
- ʻīmene : to sing, song
- Riri : be angry with (ki)
- Tārekareka : entertain, amuse, match, game, play game

== Sample text ==
Article 1 of the Universal Declaration of Human Rights in Cook Islands Māori (Rarotongan):

Kua anau rangatira ia te tangata katoatoa ma te aiteite i te au tikaanga e te tu ngateitei tiratiratu. Kua ki ia ratou e te mero kimi ravenga e te akavangakau e kia akono tetai i tetai, i roto i te vaerua piri anga taeake.

Article 1 of the Universal Declaration of Human Rights in English:

All human beings are born free and equal in dignity and rights. They are endowed with reason and conscience and should act towards one another in a spirit of brotherhood.

== Sources ==
- Cook Islands Maori Database Project, an online project created to build a collection of Cook Islands Maori words based on existing print dictionaries and other sources
- Cook Islands Maori Dictionary, by Jasper Buse with Raututi Taringa, edited by Bruce Biggs and Rangi Moekaʻa, Auckland, 1995.
- A dictionary of the Maori Language of Rarotonga, Manuscript by Stephen Savage, Suva: IPS, USP in association with the Ministry of Education of the Cook Islands, 1983.
- Kai Korero: Cook Islands Maori Language Coursebook, Tai Carpentier and Clive Beaumont, Pasifika Press, 1995. (A useful learning method with oral skills cassette)
- Cook Islands Cook Book by Taiora Matenga-Smith. Published by the Institute of Pacific Studies.
- Maori Lessons for the Cook Islands, by Taira Rere. Wellington, Islands Educational Division, Department of Education, 1960.
- Conversational Maori, Rarotongan Language, by Taira Rere. Rarotonga, Government Printer. 1961.
- Some Maori Lessons, by Taira Rere. Rarotonga. Curriculum Production Unit, Department of Education. 1976.
- More Maori Lessons, by Taira Rere. Suva, University of the South Pacific.1976
- Maori Spelling: Notes for Teachers, by Taira Rere. Rarotonga: Curriculum Production Unit, Education Department.1977.
- Traditions and Some Words of the Language of Danger or Pukapuka Island. Journal of the Polynesian Society 13:173-176.1904.
- Collection of Articles on Rarotonga Language, by Jasper Buse. London: University of London, School of Oriental and African Studies. 1963.
- Manihikian Traditional Narratives: In English and Manihikian: Stories of the Cook Islands (Na fakahiti o Manihiki). Papatoetoe, New Zealand: Te Ropu Kahurangi.1988
- Te korero o Aitutaki, na te Are Korero o Aitutaki, Ministry of Cultural Development, Rarotonga, Cook Islands. 1992
- Atiu nui Maruarua: E au tua taʻito, Vainerere Tangatapoto et al. University of South Pacific, Suva 1984. (in Maori and English)
- Learning Rarotonga Maori, by Makiʻuti Tongia, Ministry of Cultural Development, Rarotonga 1999.
- Te uri Reo Maori (translating in Maori), by Makiʻuti Tongia, Punanga o te reo. 1996.
- Atiu, e enua e tona iti tangata, te au tata tuatua Ngatupuna Kautai...(et al.), Suva, University of the South Pacific. 1993. (Maori translation of Atiu: an island Community)
- A vocabulary of the Mangaian language by Christian, F. W. 1924. Bernice P. Bishop Bulletin 2. Honolulu, Bernice P. Bishop Museum.
- E au tuatua taʻito no Manihiki, Kauraka Kauraka, IPS, USP, Suva. 1987.
