= Rakahanga Island =

Island in the Cook Islands

Coordinates: 10°1′54.26″S 161°6′4.72″W

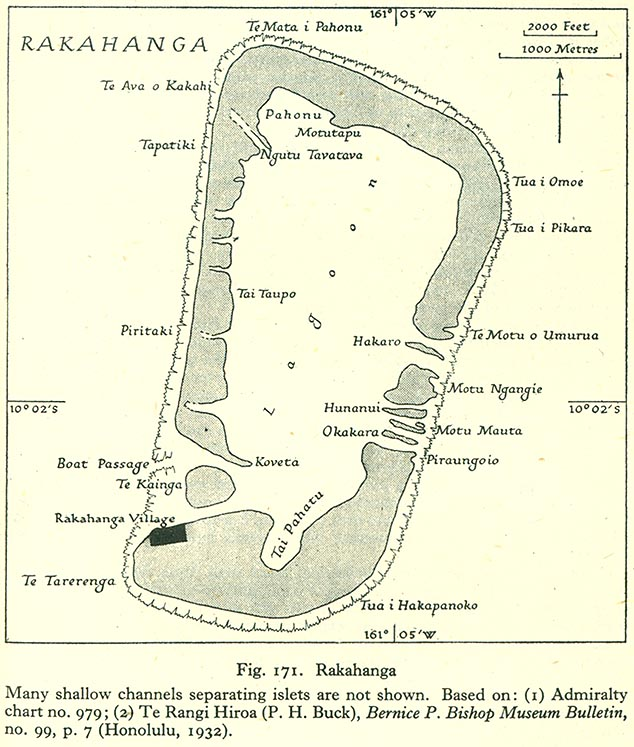
Map of Rakahanga Atoll

Rakahanga Island is one of 11 islands in the Rakahanga atoll of the Cook Islands. It is on the southern edge of the lagoon, and the village of Nivano and the atoll's harbour are located on the island.
