= Operation Jove =

- Part of Portuguese Colonial War and Guinea-Bissau War of Independence
Date	16–19 November 1969
Location	Guidaje, Portuguese Guinea
Result	Portuguese victory

Belligerents
Portugal	(Guinea-Bissau) PAIGC; Cuba

Commanders and leaders
(Portugal) Fausto Mendes (Portugal) João de Bessa	(Guinea-Bissau) Unknown (Cuba) Cap. Pedro Rodriguez Peralta (POW)

Units involved
(Portugal) Forças Armadas: Portuguese Army; Portuguese Air Force	Unknown

Strength
105 soldiers	Unknown

Casualties and losses
None	1 guerrilla killed 1 Cuban wounded/captured

Operation Jove (Portuguese: Operação Jove) was a military operation launched by the Portuguese Army, it lasted from 16 to 19 November in 1969. The operation occurred in Guinea-Bissau, which was then known as Portuguese Guinea, and was a Portuguese victory. The operation was part of the Guinea-Bissau War of Independence and the Portuguese Colonial War.

== The operation ==
The "Guileje Corridor" constituted the main line of infiltration of the PAIGC in Guinea. In reality, it was an open track of the forest that came from Kandianfara, in the Republic of Guinea-Conakry, and penetrated the territory through the Quitafine region in the South. In November 1969, Portuguese listening services captured the information of the passage of an important column with war material, in which Nino Vieira, at the same time the mythical commander of the Southern Front, was displaced, and the Commander-in-Chief of the Portuguese forces in Guinea assigned to the Battalion of Parachute Hunters n.12, the mission to intercept the guerrillas.

Two parachute companies were transported by plane from Bissau to Aldeia Formosa in the South on 16 November, and from there the men were placed on the ground by helicopter. The ambush was set up on 17 November, with seventy men on a backstop, thirty-five in support, and another thirty-five on the "Corridor of Guileje".

On 18 November, after a difficult march through the woods and shortly after other troops from this group had installed the device, voices were heard and two armed men, white and black, appeared in the bite. The paratrooper aiming the machine gun opened fire, killing the black guerrilla and wounding the white, the latter managed to flee into the forest, trying to hide the blood trail, but after difficult chase, the paratroopers found the wounded man completely exhausted by the lost blood. He was given first aid and in a brief interrogation he identified himself as Pedro Rodriguez Peralta a 32 year-old captain in the Cuban Army, who'd born in Santiago de Cuba. He was evacuated by helicopter to Bissau and from there to Lisbon. He was released after the revolution on 25 April 1974.
