= Penrhyn language =

Northern Cook Islands Māori dialect

Penrhyn
- Mangarongaro, Penrhynese, Tongareva
- tongareva
- Native to: Cook Islands
- Region: Penrhyn Island, Northern Cook Islands
- Native speakers: 200 (2011 census)
- Language family: Austronesian: Malayo-Polynesian; Oceanic; Polynesian; Eastern Polynesian; Tahitic; Penrhyn

Language codes
- ISO 639-3: pnh
- Glottolog: penr1237
- ELP: Penrhyn
- Penrhyn is classified as Severely Endangered by the UNESCO Atlas of the World's Languages in Danger

Penrhyn is a Cook Islands Maori dialect belonging to the Polynesian language family. It is spoken by about 200 people on Penrhyn Island and other islands in the Northern Cook Islands. It is considered to be an endangered language as many of its users are shifting to Cook Islands Māori and English.

== Phonology ==
=== Consonants ===
Consonants in Penrhyn
	Labial	Alveolar	Velar	Glottal
Nasal	m	n	ŋ ⟨ng⟩	
Stop	p	t	k	
Fricative	(f) (Note: [f] is present in loanwords from languages like Rakahanga-Manihiki and Tahitian.) v	s		h
Liquid		l ⟨r⟩		

Tongareva is one of the few Cook Islands languages without a glottal stop [ʔ]. There is allophonic voicing of stops present.

=== Vowels ===
Vowel inventory
	Front		Central		Back	
	short	long	short	long	short	long
High	i	iː ⟨ī⟩			u	uː ⟨ū⟩
Mid	e	eː ⟨ē⟩			o	oː ⟨ō⟩
Low			a	aː ⟨ā⟩		

Long vowels are written with a macron.

== Alphabet ==
The alphabet used in the Penrhyn Dictionary has 21 letters: ⟨a, ā, e, ē, f, h, i, ī, k, m, n, ng, o, ō, p, r, s, t, u, ū, v⟩
