= History of Puducherry =

Puducherry was mentioned in the Periplus of the Erythraean Sea, 1st century CE.

The City of Puducherry (French: La ville de Pondichéry) on the southeast coast of India does not have a recorded history from antiquity. Puducherry has history recorded only after the advent of the colonial powers such as the Dutch, Portuguese, English and the French. Nearby places such as Arikanmedu (Now Ariyankuppam), Kakayanthoppe, Villianur, and Bahur, which were annexed by the French East India Company over a period of time and became the Union Territory of Puducherry after Independence, have written histories that predate the colonial era.

== Early period ==
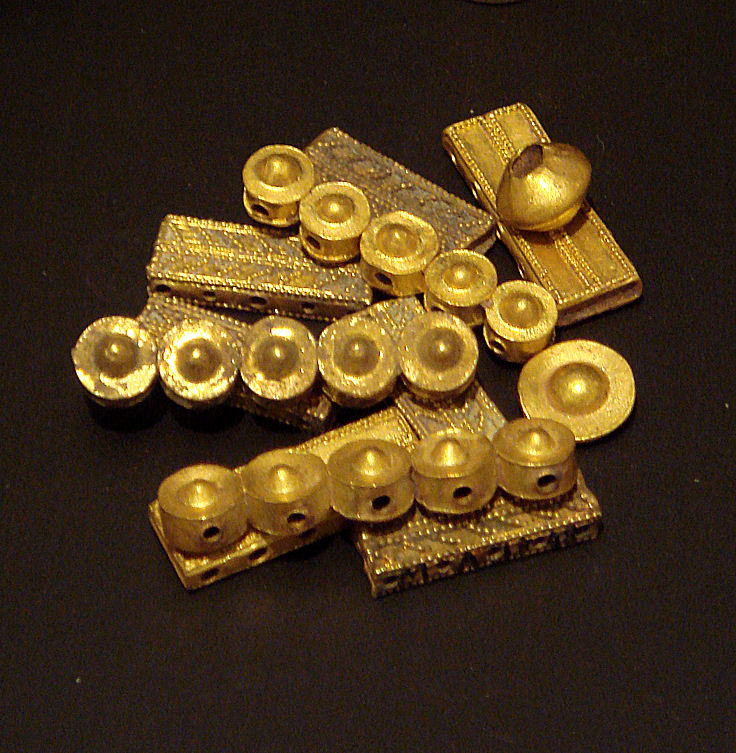
Vishva jewellery from Suttukeni, Puducherry, 2nd century BC. Musee Guimet.

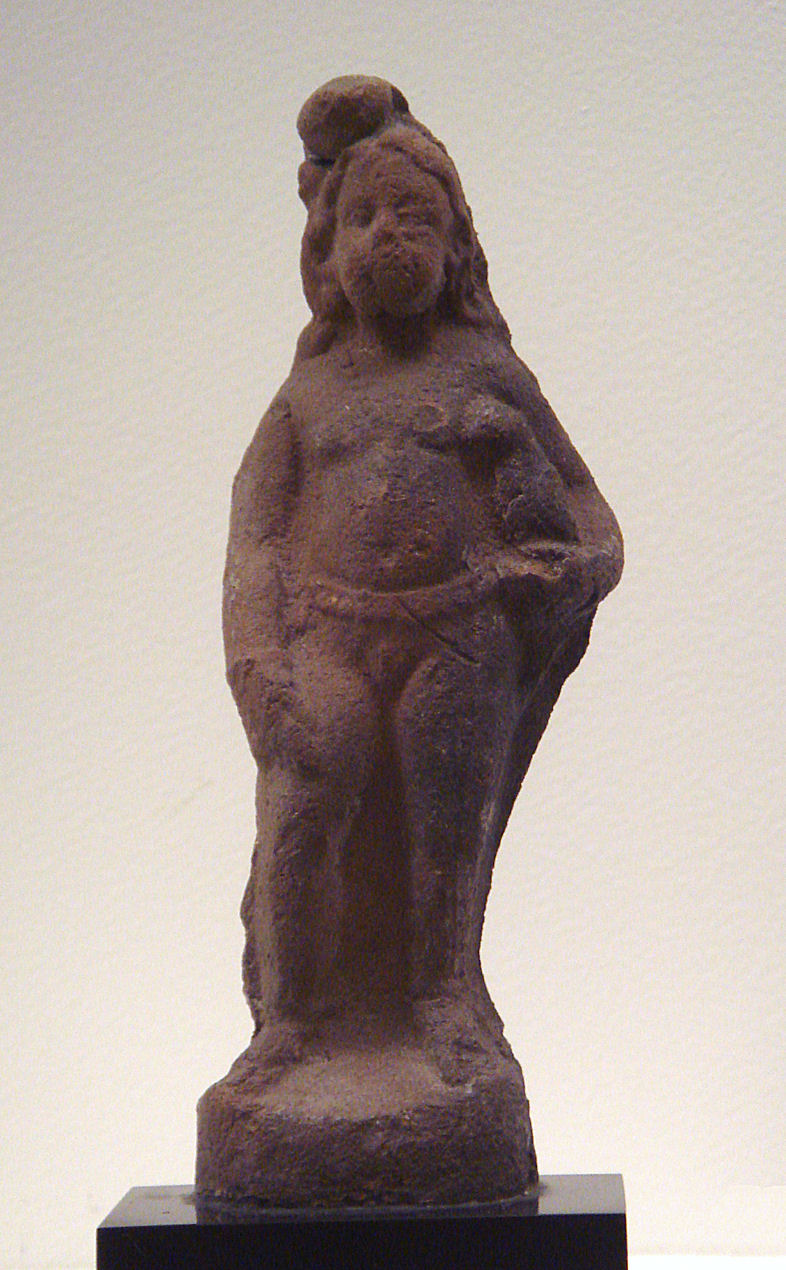
Child with bird, a classical Greco-Roman motif, Virampatnam, Arikamedu, 1st-2nd century. Musee Guimet.

The Periplus of the Erythraean Sea, of the 1st century, mentions a marketplace named Poduke or Poduca (ch. 60). G.W.B. Huntingford identified this as possibly being Arikamedu (now part of Ariyankuppam), located about 2 miles (3.2 km) from the modern city of Pondicherry. Puducherry was apparently an important destination for Roman trade with India. Huntingford further notes that Roman pottery was found at Arikamedu in 1937. In addition, archaeological excavations between 1944 and 1949 showed that it was "a trading station to which goods of Roman manufacture were imported during the first half of the 1st century AD".

At the beginning of the 4th century AD, the Puducherry area was part of the Pallava Kingdom of Kanchipuram. During the following centuries different southern dynasties controlled Puducherry: in the 10th century AD. the Chola of Thanjavur.

== European period ==
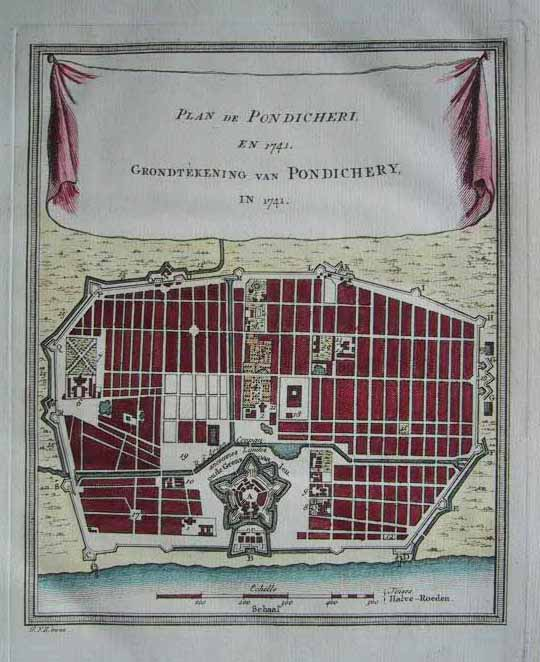
Bellin's plan of Pondicherry, a copperplate engraving

In 1674 the French East India Company set up a trading centre at Pondicherry. This factory outpost was made to be a manufacturing hub that eventually became the chief French East India Company settlement in India through the 19th century.

Dutch and British trading companies also wanted trade with India. Wars raged among these European countries and spilled over into the Indian subcontinent. The Dutch captured Puducherry in 1693 but returned it to France by the Treaty of Ryswick in 1699.

The French acquired Mahe in the 1720s, Yanam in 1731, and Karaikal in 1738. During the Anglo-French wars (1742–1763), Puducherry changed hands frequently. On 16 January 1761, the British captured Puducherry from the French, but the Treaty of Paris (1763) at the conclusion of the Seven Years' War returned it.

In 1792, Venant of Durfort, son of the Count of Civrac, was made governor of Pondicherry, thanks to his uncle Emmanuel-Félicité, Duke of Duras, who had been made president of the compagnie des Indes in 1788. After an outstanding military career in Europe, Venant fought hard to destroy all revolutionary hopes in Pondicherry, as republican ideals coming from France were threatening the economic stability of the region. He took great care to maintain commercial relations with other European powers in the region. His links with England were strengthened through his marriage with Catherine Browne of Kilmor. Venant died in July 1792 and was buried at Our Lady of Angels in Pondicherry.

The British took control of the area again in 1793 at the Siege of Pondicherry amid the Wars of the French Revolution, and returned it to France in 1814. When the British gained control of the whole of India in the late 1850s, they allowed the French to retain their settlements in the country. Pondicherry, Mahe, Yanam, Karaikal and Chandernagar remained a part of French India until 1954.

=== The end of French rule ===
The independence of India in 1947 gave impetus to the union of France's Indian possessions with former British India. An agreement between France and India in 1948 stipulated that the inhabitants of France's Indian possessions would choose their political future. The de jure union of French India with the Indian Union did not take place until 1962. On a de facto basis, the bureaucracy had been united with India's on 1 November 1954. It was organized as a Union Territory in 1963. Puducherry is now a part of India.

== Separation from France ==
=== Cession of Pondicherry and Karikalan ===
From the time India gained its independence from British rule in 1947, it raised the issue of the French settlements on the continent with the Government of France. It took seven years for Puducherry to effectively unite with independent India. Political agitation to achieve this goal began earlier.

In 1787 and 1791, farmers of Karaikal agitated against the heavy land tax imposed by the French. The rebellion of 1857 had an effect in the French settlements but it did not attract the attention of the rulers, as the incidents were few and considered as local. People employed legal means to fight against the French. In 1873, an advocate, Ponnuthammbi Pillai, convinced a Paris court of his cause. He won the case in which he was fined by a French magistrate in Pondicherry for walking into the court with footwear.

Student protests in 1927 and 1930 expressed their desire for an end of French oversight. Leaders such as Mahatma Gandhi, Jawaharlal Nehru, and Bal Gangadhar Tilak visited Pondicherry and its other enclaves and addressed the meetings. In 1934, Swami and friends, a monthly, was started by veteran independence activist and trade union leader R.K. Narayan for the cause of workers and the country.

Police control, which warranted trade union unrest, further increased civilian agitation against the colonial government. In the late 1930, grassroots organizations known as mahajana sabhas were started in Pondicherry and Karaikal. These groups, along with trade unions, organized the Non-Cooperation Movement. During the Second World War, Puducherry supported France with men and materiel. Deaths among French-Indian soldiers caused unrest in the enclaves.

In 1946, the French India Congress was formed with the objective of integrating the French possessions with India. Later the following year, the French India Students Congress adopted a resolution on merger. In January 1948, the French People's Convention passed a resolution expressing its determination to merge the French possessions with India. The Communist Party asked the people to accept only the merger.

The post-independence government under Prime Minister Jawaharlal Nehru was anxious to integrate the French Indian territories with the country. Fr. Jerome D'Souza - a member of the Constituent Assembly of India - was appointed by the Government of India to negotiate with the French authorities in Pondicherry. As a result of these negotiations, the French agreed to hold a referendum in their territories regarding the political status of the French territories in India. However, sensing that the result of the referendum may not be in favor of merger with India, the Government of India withdrew support for the referendum. The Congress Party issued a declaration that the people of Pondicherry were not interested in the referendum for various reasons. India signed an agreement with France in June 1948 which gave power to the people to determine the political status of their land. Accordingly, municipal elections in Pondicherry, Karaikal and Yanam were held in October 1948. All municipalities except one elected representatives of the French India Socialist Party, a pro-French group. The new councillors at a meeting accepted the autonomy offered by the French Government.

The Indian Government continued to press for unification, pledging a distinct status and help for Puducherry after its merger with India.

As the unification movement gathered momentum under Subbiah, the pro-French leader Edouard Goubert switched his loyalty to the pro-merger camp. This movement was coordinated by many leaders like D.K.Ramanujam and Mr. Chandrasekara Reddiar. A momentous event in the freedom movement of Puducherry occurred on 18 March 1954, when the members of the executive council and mayors of Pondicherry and seven adjoining communes proclaimed their decision to merge with India without a referendum. All the communes in Karaikal also followed suit. This decision was to be confirmed by the Representative Assembly. When the Socialist Party was preparing to move the merger resolution, the French governor scuttled it by postponing the session. Provoked by this, the Socialists planned to capture the outlying communes one by one and move to Pondicherry. The Communist Party was also ready to launch a campaign of direct action to merge Puducherry with India. Accordingly, the leaders of the Socialist Party hoisted the Indian national flag atop the Nettapakkam police station on the last day of March in 1954. Subsequently, many villages in Mannadipet and Bahour communes came under the sway of the pro-merger forces. In the Karaikal region, all the communes and Karaikal municipality passed a resolution in favour of merger. The National Youth Congress began a Satyagraha. An independence activists' procession was charged by police using lathi and the flags carried by the processionists were seized and torn by the French Indian Police.Mr. Chandrasekara Reddiar and D.K. Ramanujam were arrested.

India and France, following talks, issued a joint statement on 13 October 1954 announcing a procedure for deciding the status of the French settlements. Five days later, on 18 October 1954 the elected members of the Representative Assembly and the municipal councillors of Pondicherry and Karaikkal took part in a referendum at Kizhur. Of the 178 members voting, an overwhelming majority of 170 members favoured the merger of French Indian territories with the Republic of India. Three days later, an agreement on the de facto transfer of the French territories to India was signed in New Delhi between the two countries.

A treaty of cession was signed by the two countries in May 1956. It was ratified by the French parliament in May 1962. On 16 August 1962 India and France exchanged the instruments of ratification under which France ceded to India full sovereignty over the territories it held. Pondicherry and the other enclaves of Karaikal, Mahe and Yanam came to be administered as the Union Territory of Puducherry from 1 July 1963.

=== Cession of Chandernagore ===
Under the Indo-French Agreement of June 1948, the first municipal elections were held in Chandernagore in August, elections in which the Congress Karmaparishad won 22 of the 24 seats. The new municipal assembly overwhelmingly voted for merger with the Indian Union but it took until 9 June 1952 before the Government of India took control. Later, in 1954, Chandernagore became part of the Hoogly district of West Bengal.

=== Cession of Yanam ===
Conditions became intolerable in Yanam after its mayor and other representatives of Yanam adopted the merger resolution. The mayor, deputy mayor, and over 200 people took refuge in the adjacent areas of the Indian Union. Police and hired vigilantes from Yanam assaulted refugees on Indian soil. The refugees marched into Yanam under the leadership of Dadala Raphael Ramanayya and took over the administration. After hoisting the Indian National Flag, they adopted a resolution declaring Yanam "liberated".

=== Cession of Mahe ===
Close on their heels in Yanam, in Mahe, the Mahajana sabha under its president, I.K. Kumaran began a picketing programme. Some days later, hundreds of volunteers marched into Mahe to stage a demonstration in front of the administrator's residence. They were joined by citizens of the enclave. On 16 July 1954, Kumaran took over the administration from the French administrator marking the end of 224 years of French rule in Mahe.

=== Date of Events ===
French India
Colony	Rebellion	De facto transfer	Treaty of Cession	De jure transfer	Merger
Chandernagore		2 May 1950	2 February 1951	9 June 1952	1 October 1954
Pondichéry		1 November 1954	28 May 1956	16 August 1962	1 July 1963
Karikal		1 November 1954	28 May 1956	16 August 1962	1 July 1963
Yanaon	13 June 1954	1 November 1954	28 May 1956	16 August 1962	1 July 1963
Mahé	16 June 1954	1 November 1954	28 May 1956	16 August 1962	1 July 1963

== List of French Governors in India ==
Commissaires:

- François Caron, 1668–1672
- François Baron, 1672–1681
- François Martin, 1681 – November 1693
- Dutch occupation, September 1693 - September 1699 <-- Treaty of Ryswick (1697)

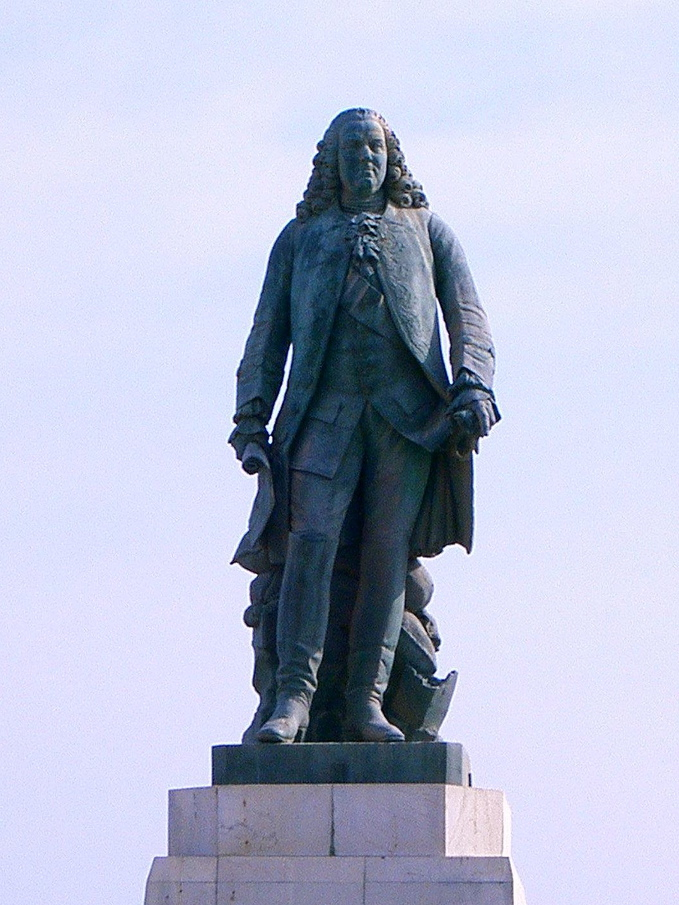
Monument to Joseph François Dupleix in Puducherry

Gouverneurs Généraux:

- François Martin, September 1699 - 31 December 1706
- Pierre Dulivier, January 1707-July 1708
- Guillaume André d'Hébert, 1708–1712
- Pierre Dulivier, 1712–1717
- Guillaume André d'Hébert, 1717–1718
- Pierre André Prévost de La Prévostière, August 1718 – 11 October 1721
- Pierre Christoph Le Noir (Acting), 1721–1723
- Joseph Beauvollier de Courchant, 1723–1726
- Pierre Christoph Le Noir, 1726–1734
- Pierre Benoît Dumas, 1734–1741
- Joseph François Dupleix, 14 January 1742 – 15 October 1754
- Charles Godeheu, Le commissaire (Acting), 15 October 1754–1754
- Georges Duval de Leyrit, 1754–1758
- Thomas Arthur, comte de Lally-Tollendal, 1758 – 16 January 1761
- First British occupation, 15 January 1761 – 25 June 1765 <-- Treaty of Paris (1763)
- Jean Law de Lauriston, 1765–1766
- Antoine Boyellau, 1766–1767
- Jean Law de Lauriston, 1767 – January 1777
- Guillaume de Bellecombe, seigneur de Teirac, January 1777–1782
- Charles Joseph Pâtissier, Marquis de Bussy-Castelnau, 1783–1785
- Le Vicomte, François de Souillac, 1785
- David Charpentier de Cossigny, October 1785–1787
- Thomas, comte de Conway, October 1787–1789
- Camille Charles Leclerc, chevalier de Fresne, 1789–1792
- Dominique Prosper de Chermont, November 1792–1793
- L. Leroux de Touffreville, 1793
- Second British occupation, 23 August 1793 – 18 June 1802 <-- Treaty of Amiens (1802)
- Charles Matthieu Isidore, Comte Decaen, 18 June 1802 - August 1803
- Louis François Binot, 1803
- Third British occupation, August 1803 – 26 September 1816 <-- Treaty of Paris (1814)
- André Julien Comte Dupuy, 26 September 1816 – October 1825
- Joseph Cordier, Marie Emmanuel (Acting), October 1825 – 19 June 1826
- Eugène Desbassayns de Richemont, 1826 – 2 August 1828
- Joseph Cordier, Marie Emmanuel (Acting), 2 August 1828 – 11 April 1829
- Auguste Jacques Nicolas Peureux de Mélay, 11 April 1829 – 3 May 1835
- Hubert Jean Victor, Marquis de Saint-Simon, 3 May 1835 – April 1840
- Paul de Nourquer du Camper, April 1840 - 1844
- Louis Pujol, 1844–1849
- Hyacinthe Marie de Lalande de Calan, 1849–1850
- Philippe Achille Bédier, 1851–1852
- Raymond de Saint-Maur, August 1852 - April 1857
- Alexandre Durand d'Ubraye, April 1857 - January 1863
- Napoléon Joseph Louis Bontemps, January 1863 - June 1871
- Antoine-Léonce Michaux, June 1871 - November 1871
- Pierre Aristide Faron, November 1871 - 1875
- Adolph Joseph Antoine Trillard, 1875–1878
- Léonce Laugier, February 1879 - April 1881
- Théodore Drouhet, 1881 - October 1884
- Étienne Richaud, October 1884 - 1886
- Édouard Manès, 1886–1888
- Georges Jules Piquet, 1888–1889
- Louis Hippolyte Marie Nouet, 1889–1891
- Léon Émile Clément-Thomas, 1891–1896
- Louis Jean Girod, 1896 - February 1898
- François Pierre Rodier, February 1898 - 11 January 1902
- Pelletan (Acting), 11 January 1902 - 1902
- Victor Louis Marie Lanrezac, 1902–1904
- Philema Lemaire, August 1904 - April 1905
- Joseph Pascal François, April 1905 - October 1906
- Gabriel Louis Angoulvant, October 1906 - 3 December 1907
- Adrien Jules Jean Bonhoure, 1908–1909
- Ernest Fernand Lévecque, 1909 - 9 July 1910
- Alfred Albert Martineau, 9 July 1910 - July 1911
- Pierre Louis Alfred Duprat, July 1911 - November 1913
- Alfred Albert Martineau, November 1913 - 29 June 1918
- (unknown), 29 June 1918 – 21 February 1919
- Louis Martial Innocent Gerbinis, 21 February 1919 – 11 February 1926
- Pierre Jean Henri Didelot, 1926–1928
- Robert Paul Marie de Guise, 1928–1931
- François Adrien Juvanon, 1931–1934
- Léon Solomiac, August 1934 – 1936
- Horace Valentin Crocicchia, 1936–1938
- Louis Alexis Étienne Bonvin, 26 September 1938–1945
- Nicolas Ernest Marie Maurice Jeandin, 1945–1946
- Charles François Marie Baron, 20 March 1946 – 20 August 1947

Inde française became a Territoire d'outre-mer for France in 1946.

Commissaires:

- Charles François Marie Baron, 20 August 1947 - May 1949
- Charles Chambon, May 1949 - 31 July 1950
- André Ménard, 31 July 1950 - October 1954
- Georges Escargueil, October 1954 - 1 November 1954

de facto transfer to Republic of India

High Commissioners:

- Mr. Kewal Singh 1 November 1954–1957
- M.K. Kripalani 1957–1958
- L.R.S. Singh 1958–1958
- AS Bam 1960
- Sanath Kumar Banerji 1961–1961
