= List of lieutenant governors of Puducherry =

Head of state in Union Territory of Puducherry

Lieutenant Governor of Puducherry
- புதுச்சேரி துணைநிலை ஆளுநர் పుదుచ్చేరి లెఫ్టినెంట్ గవర్నర్ പുതുച്ചേരി ലെഫ്റ്റനന്റ് ഗവർണർ; Lieutenants-gouverneurs de Pondichéry
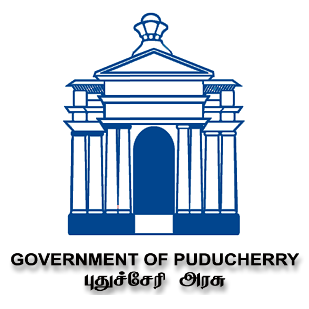
- Emblem of Puducherry

- Flag of India

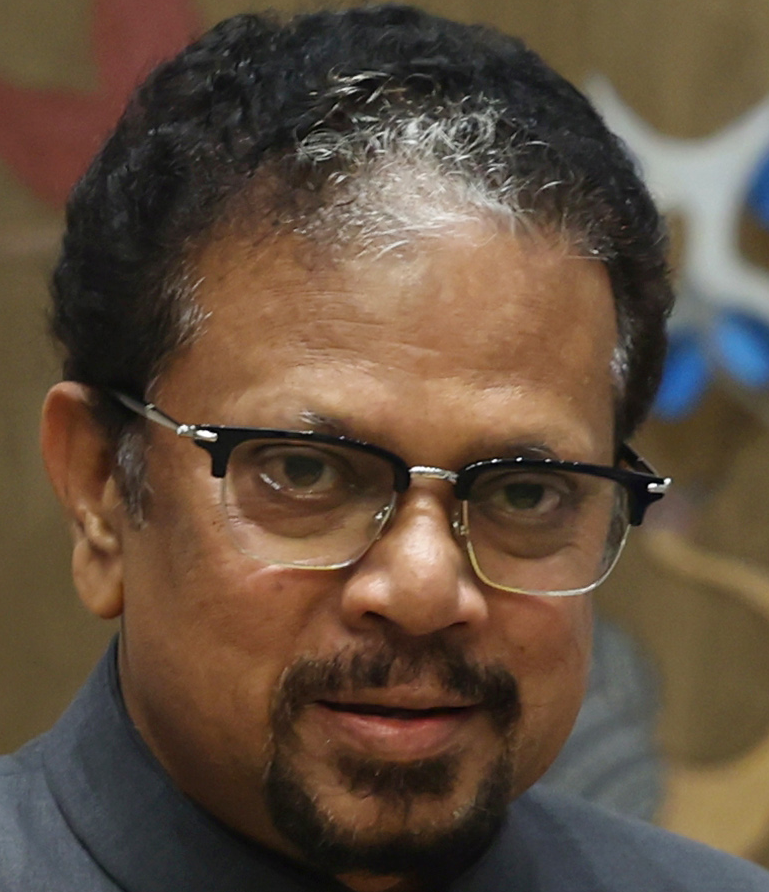
- Incumbent; Kuniyil Kailashnathan since 7 August 2024
- Style: His Excellency (formal); The Honourable (informal)
- Status: Head of State (Union Territory)
- Reports to: President of India; Government of India
- Residence: Lok Niwas, Puducherry
- Appointer: President of India on the advice of the Government of India
- Term length: 5 Years
- Inaugural holder: S. L. Silam
- Formation: 14 October 1963 (62 years ago)

Puducherry (formerly known as "Pondicherry") is a Union Territory of India. Governance and administration of the territory fall under the federal authority.

== Predecessor ==
=== Commissioners ===
#	Name	Took office	Left office	Notes
1	François Caron	1668	1672	
2	François Baron	1672	1681	
3	François Martin	1681	November 1693	
4	Dutch occupation	September 1693	September 1699	Treaty of Ryswick (1697)

=== Governors ===
In the days of the French East India Company, the title of the top official was most of the time Governor of Pondicherry and General Commander of the French settlements in the East Indies (French: Gouverneur de Pondichéry et Commandant Général des Établissements Français aux Indes Orientales). After 1816, it was Governor of French establishments in India (French: Gouverneur des Établissements Français de l'Inde').

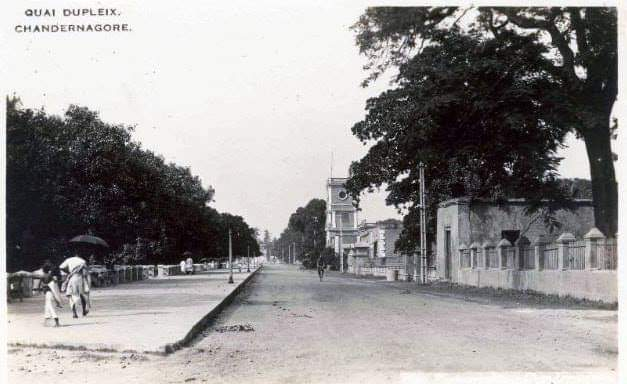
Quai Dupleix at Strand Road Chandernagor

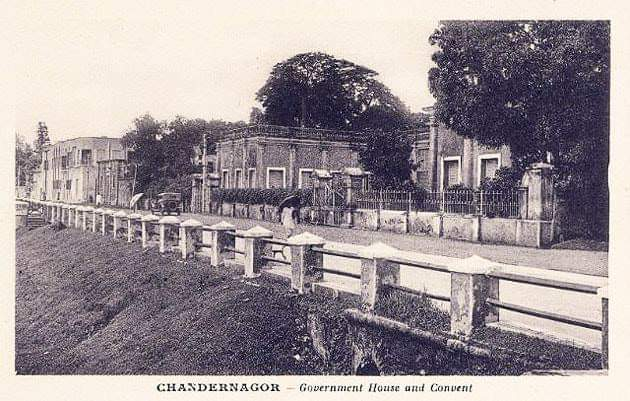
Chandernagore Government House and Convent

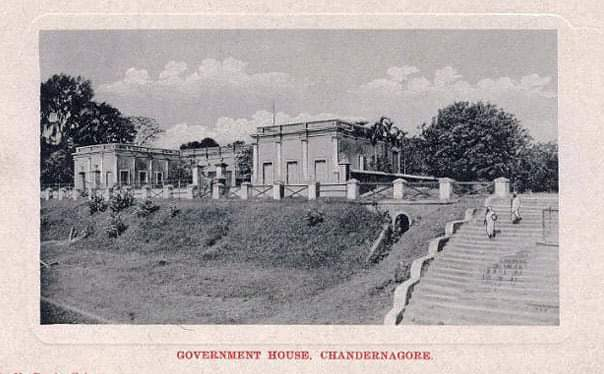
Chandernagor Government House

#	Name	Took office	Left office	Notes
1	François Martin	September 1699	31 December 1706	
2	Pierre Dulivier	January 1707	July 1708	Acting
3	Guillaume André d'Hébert	1708	1712	
4	Pierre Dulivier	1713	1715	
5	Guillaume André d'Hébert	1715	1718	
6	Pierre André Prévost de La Prévostière	August 1718	11 October 1721	
7	Pierre Christoph Le Noir	1721	1723	Acting
8	Joseph Beauvollier de Courchant	1723	1726	
9	Pierre Christoph Le Noir	1727	1734	
10	Pierre Benoît Dumas	1735	1741	
11	Joseph François Dupleix	14 January 1742	15 October 1754	
12	Charles Godeheu	15 October 1754	1754	Acting
13	Georges Duval de Leyrit	1756	1758	
14	Thomas Arthur, comte de Lally	1758	January 1761	
15	First British occupation	15 January 1761	25 June 1765	Treaty of Paris (1763)
16	Jean Law de Lauriston	1765	1766	
17	Antoine Boyellau	1766	1767	Acting
18	Jean Law de Lauriston	1767	January 1777	
19	Guillaume de Bellecombe	January 1777	1778	
20	Second British occupation	1778	1783	Treaty of Paris (1783)
21	Marquis de Bussy-Castelnau	1783	1785	
22	François de Souillac	1785	1785	
23	David Charpentier de Cossigny	October 1785	1787	
24	Thomas Conway	October 1787	1789	
25	Camille Charles Leclerc, Chevalier de Fresne	1789	1792	
26	Dominique Prosper de Chermont	November 1792	1793	
27	L. Leroux de Touffreville	1793	1793	
28	Third British occupation	23 August 1793	18 June 1802	Treaty of Amiens (1802)
29	Charles Mathieu Isidore Decaen	18 June 1802	August 1803	
30	Louis Binot	1803	1803	
31	Fourth British occupation	August 1803	26 September 1816	Treaty of Paris (1814)
32	Comte Dupuy	26 September 1816	October 1825	
33	Joseph Cordier, Marie Emmanuel	October 1825	19 June 1826	Acting
34	Eugène Desbassayns de Richemont	1826	2 August 1828	
35	Joseph Cordier, Marie Emmanuel	2 August 1828	11 April 1829	Acting
36	Auguste Jacques Nicolas Peureux de Mélay	11 April 1829	3 May 1835	
37	Hubert Jean Victor, Marquis de Saint-Simon	3 May 1835	April 1840	
38	Paul de Nourquer du Camper	April 1840	1844	
39	Louis Pujol	1844	1849	
40	Hyacinthe Marie de Lalande de Calan	1849	1850	
41	Philippe Achille Bédier	1851	1852	
42	Raymond de Saint-Maur	August 1852	April 1857	
43	Alexandre Durand d'Ubraye	April 1857	January 1863	
44	Napoléon Joseph Louis Bontemps	January 1863	June 1871	
45	Antoine-Léonce Michaux	June 1871	November 1871	
46	Pierre Aristide Faron	November 1871	1875	
47	Adolph Joseph Antoine Trillard	1875	1878	
48	Léonce Laugier	February 1879	April 1881	
49	Théodore Drouhet	1881	October 1884	
50	Étienne Richaud	October 1884	1886	
51	Édouard Manès	1886	1888	
52	Georges Jules Piquet	1888	1889	
53	Louis Hippolyte Marie Nouet	1889	1891	
54	Léon Émile Clément-Thomas	1891	1896	
55	Louis Jean Girod	1896	February 1898	
56	François Pierre Rodier	February 1898	11 January 1902	
57	Louis Pelletan	11 January 1902	11 January 1902	Acting
58	Victor Louis Marie Lanrezac	1902	1904	
59	Philema Lemaire	August 1904	April 1905	
60	Joseph Pascal François	April 1905	October 1906	
61	Gabriel Louis Angoulvant	October 1906	3 December 1907	
62	Adrien Jules Jean Bonhoure	1908	1909	
63	Ernest Fernand Lévecque	1909	9 July 1910	
64	Alfred Albert Martineau	9 July 1910	July 1911	
65	Pierre Louis Alfred Duprat	July 1911	November 1913	
66	Alfred Albert Martineau	November 1913	29 June 1918	
67	Pierre Étienne Clayssen	29 June 1918	21 February 1919	Acting
68	Louis Martial Innocent Gerbinis	21 February 1919	11 February 1926	
69	Henri Léo Eugène Lagroua	11 February 1926	5 August 1926	Acting
70	Pierre Jean Henri Didelot	1926	1928	
71	Robert Paul Marie de Guise	1928	1931	
72	François Adrien Juvanon	1931	1934	
73	Léon Solomiac	August 1934	1936	
74	Horace Valentin Crocicchia	1936	1938	
75	Louis Alexis Étienne Bonvin	26 September 1938	1945	
76	Nicolas Ernest Marie Maurice Jeandin	1945	1946	
77	Charles François Marie Baron	20 March 1946	20 August 1947	

French India became an Overseas territory (French: territoire d'outre-mer) of France in 1946.

=== Commissioners ===
#	Name	Took office	Left office
1	Charles François Marie Baron	20 August 1947	May 1949
2	Charles Chambon	May 1949	31 July 1950
3	André Ménard	31 July 1950	October 1954
4	Georges Escargueil	October 1954	1 November 1954

French India de facto transferred to the Republic of India in 1954.

=== High Commissioners ===
The first High Commissioner, Kewal Singh was appointed immediately after the Kizhoor referendum on 21 October 1954 as per Foreign Jurisdiction Act, 1947. The Chief Commissioner had the powers of the former French commissioner, but was under the direct control of the Union Government.

The list of Chief Commissioners is given below

No.	Name	Took office	Left office
1	Kewal Singh	21 October 1954	16 November 1956
2	M.K. Kripalani	17 November 1956	27 August 1958
3	Lal Ram Saran Singh	30 August 1958	8 February 1961
4	Sisir Kumar Dutta	2 May 1961	1 August 1963
5	K.J. Somasundaram	2 August 1963	13 October 1963

=== Chief Commissioner (1954 – 1963) ===
No.	Name	Took office	Left office
1	Mirza Rashid Ali Baig	circa 1947	November 1949
2	S.K. Banerjee	31 November 1949	June 1950
3	R.K. Tandon	10 June 1950	circa October 1953
4	Kewal Singh	circa October 1953	21 October 1954

After the de facto transfer of French settlements in India, on November 1, 1954, a Chief Commissioner, appointed by Government of India, replaced the last Commissioner of French India, Georges Escargueil. The first High Commissioner, Kewal Singh was appointed immediately after the Kizhoor referendum, on 21 October 1954, as per Foreign Jurisdiction Act, 1947. The Chief Commissioner had the powers of the former French commissioner, but was under the direct control of the Union Government.

The list of Chief Commissioners is given below.

No.	Name	Portrait	Took office	Left office	De jure sovereignty	De facto sovereignty
1	Kewal Singh		21 October 1954	16 November 1956	France	France (Until Nov 1 1954); India (Since Nov 1 1954)
2	M.K. Kripalani		17 November 1956	27 August 1958	France	India
3	Lal Ram Saran Singh		30 August 1958	8 February 1961	France	India
4	Sisir Kumar Dutta		2 May 1961	1 August 1963	France (Until Aug 16 1962); India (Since Aug 16 1962)	India
5	K.J. Somasundaram		2 August 1963	13 October 1963	India	India

== List of Lieutenant Governors (1963-present) ==
The Lieutenant Governor of Puducherry resides at the Raj Nivas (French: Le Palais du Gouverneur) at the Nehru Park, the former palace of the Governor General of French India. The Central government is more directly involved in the financial well-being of the territory.

Only five Lt. Governors managed to serve more than four years. They are S.L. Silam, B.D.Jatti, B.T. Kulkarni, Rajani Rai and Kiran Bedi. Only S.L. Silam completed his 5-year term. Kiran Bedi is second longest serving Lt. Governor till date. The list of Lt. Governors of Puducherry is given below.

#	Portrait	Lieutenant Governor (born – died)	Took office	Left office	Duration	Appointed By
1		S.L. Silam (Note: T. SIVASANKAR – Addl. Charge during leave period) (1896–?)	14 Oct 1963	13 Oct 1968	5 years, 0 days	Sarvepalli Radhakrishnan
2		B.D. Jatti (1912–2002)	14 Oct 1968	7 Nov 1972	4 years, 24 days	Zakir Hussain
3		Chhedi Lal	8 Nov 1972	29 Aug 1976	3 years, 295 days	V. V. Giri
4		Bidesh Tukaram Kulkarni (1909–1988)	30 Aug 1976	31 Oct 1980	4 years, 62 days	Fakruddin Ali Ahmed
5		Ram Kishore Vyas (1908–2011)	1 Nov 1980	15 Apr 1981	165 days	Neelam Sanjiva Reddy
6		Sadiq Ali (Additional charge) (1952–2011)	16 Apr 1981	26 Jul 1981	101 days	Neelam Sanjiva Reddy
7		R.N. Haldipur	27 Jul 1981	14 May 1982	291 days	Neelam Sanjiva Reddy
8		K.M. Chandy (1921–1998)	15 May 1982	5 Aug 1983	1 year, 82 days	Neelam Sanjiva Reddy
9		Kona Prabhakara Rao (1916–1990)	2 Sep 1983	17 Jun 1984	289 days	Giani Zail Singh
10		S.L. Khurana (1918–2007) (Additional charge)	18 Jun 1984	30 Sep 1984	104 days	Giani Zail Singh
11		Tribhuvan Prasad Tewary	1 Oct 1984	21 Jun 1988	3 years, 264 days	Giani Zail Singh
12		Ranjit Singh Dyal (1928–2012)	22 Jun 1988	19 Feb 1990	1 year, 242 days	Ramaswamy Venkataraman
13		Chandrawati (1928–2020)	19 Feb 1990	18 Dec 1990	302 days	Ramaswamy Venkataraman
14		Har Swarup Singh	19 Dec 1990	05 Feb 1993	2 years, 48 days	Ramaswamy Venkataraman
15		Bhishma Narain Singh (Additional charge) (1933–2018)	06 Feb 1993	31 May 1993	2 years, 84 days	Shankar Dayal Sharma
16		Marri Channa Reddy (1919–1996) (Additional charge)	31 May 1993	1 May 1995	1 year, 335 days	Shankar Dayal Sharma
17		Rajendra Kumari Bajpai (1925–1999)	2 May 1995	22 Apr 1998	2 years, 355 days	Shankar Dayal Sharma
18		Rajani Rai (1931–2013)	23 Apr 1998	29 Jul 2002	4 years, 97 days	K. R. Narayanan
19		K. R. Malkani (1921–2003)	31 Jul 2002	27 Oct 2003	1 year, 88 days	A. P. J. Abdul Kalam
20		P. S. Ramamohan Rao (Additional charge) (b.1934)	27 Oct 2003	5 Jan 2004	70 days	A. P. J. Abdul Kalam
21		Nagendra Nath Jha (1935–2020)	5 Jan 2004	6 Jul 2004	183 days	A. P. J. Abdul Kalam
22		Madan Mohan Lakhera (1937–2026)	7 Jul 2004	18 Jul 2006	2 years, 11 days	A. P. J. Abdul Kalam
23		Mukut Mithi (b.1952)	19 Jul 2006	12 Mar 2008	1 year, 237 days	A. P. J. Abdul Kalam
24		Bhopinder Singh (b.1946)	15 Mar 2008	22 Jul 2008	129 days	Pratibha Patil
25		Govind Singh Gurjar (1932–2009)	23 Jul 2008	6 Apr 2009	257 days	Pratibha Patil
26		Surjit Singh Barnala (Note: Appointed as Administrator of Puducherry) (1925–2017)	9 Apr 2009	27 Jul 2009	109 days	Pratibha Patil
27		Iqbal Singh (b.1945)	27 Jul 2009	9 Jul 2013	3 years, 347 days	Pratibha Patil
28		Virendra Kataria (1931–2019)	10 Jul 2013	11 Jul 2014	1 year, 1 day	Pranab Mukherjee
29		A. K. Singh (b.1953)	12 Jul 2014	26 May 2016	1 year, 319 days	Pranab Mukherjee
30		Kiran Bedi (b.1949)	28 May 2016	16 Feb 2021	4 years, 264 days	Pranab Mukherjee
31		Tamilisai Soundararajan (Additional charge) (b.1961)	18 Feb 2021	18 March 2024 (Note: Resigned)	3 years, 30 days	Ram Nath Kovind
32		C.P. Radhakrishnan (Additional charge) (b.1957)	20 March 2024	6 August 2024	134 days	Droupadi Murmu
33		Kuniyil Kailashnathan (b.1953)	7 August 2024	Incumbent	2 years, 67 days	Droupadi Murmu

== See also ==
- Puducherry
- Governors in India
- Puducherry Legislative Assembly
- List of chief ministers of Puducherry
- List of consuls general of India in the French India
- List of speakers of the Puducherry Legislative Assembly
