= Siege of Pondicherry (1793) =

Part of the French Revolutionary Wars

- Part of the War of the First Coalition
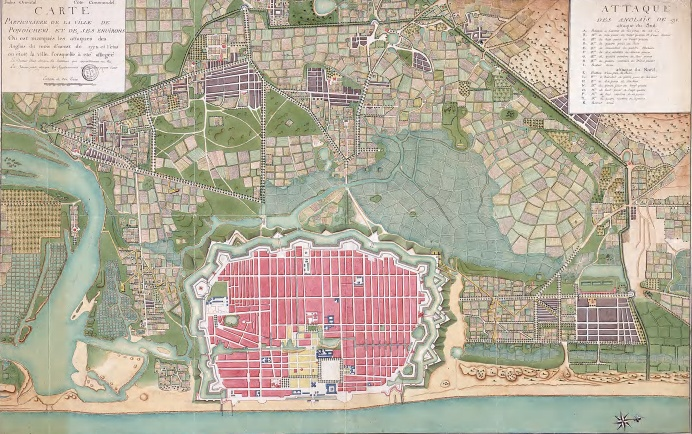
- 1778 map of Pondicherry
Date	1–23 August 1793
Location	Pondicherry, French India 11°56′N 79°50′E
Result	British victory

Belligerents
Great Britain	France

Commanders and leaders
John Braithwaite; William Cornwallis	Dominique Prosper de Chermont (surrendered)

Strength
Unknown	Unknown

Casualties and losses
93 killed 131 wounded	Unknown killed or wounded 1,659 captured
- Location within Puducherry Siege of Pondicherry (1793) (India)

The siege of Pondicherry was a colonial military operation in the early stages of the French Revolutionary Wars. Britain and France both controlled colonies on the Indian subcontinent and when the French National Convention declared war on Britain on 1 February 1793, both sides were prepared for conflict in India. British India was centred on the principal ports of Bombay, Madras and Calcutta, administered by the East India Company. French India was governed from Pondicherry (modern Puducherry) on the Coromandel Coast. British forces in India were considerably stronger than the French, with the Presidency armies supported by British Army detachments and a Royal Navy squadron under Rear-Admiral William Cornwallis. Pondicherry's defenses were strong, but the garrison was too small to effectively man the walls, and although a French frigate squadron was stationed at the distant Île de France, it was unable to effectively protect the French Indian coast.

News of the outbreak of war took five months to reach the Indian Ocean but British forces, recently engaged in the Third Anglo-Mysore War, were mobilised in preparation and immediately seized the ports of French India. Only Pondicherry was able to resist, and a siege was instigated on 1 August 1793 by Colonel John Braithwaite while Cornwallis imposed a naval blockade. British forces constructed trenches and batteries, often under heavy fire, over the following weeks. Twenty days after the city was cut off, Braithwaite began a bombardment of the defences. Within hours the French commander Colonel Prosper de Chermont requested a truce, followed the next morning by an unconditional surrender.

== Background ==
In the 1790s Great Britain was the largest colonial power on the Indian subcontinent, its administration based at the port of Calcutta in Bengal, supported by the cities of Madras and Bombay and a network of subsidiary coastal trading stations. The administration of British India was largely delegated to the East India Company, which maintained the standing Presidency armies supported by detachments from the regular British Army. This force had been heavily engaged in the Third Anglo-Mysore War of 1789 to 1792. Naval support was provided by a squadron under Rear-Admiral William Cornwallis in the frigate HMS Minerva, which had blockaded Tellicherry during the Mysore War.

The French military position in India was considerably weaker than the British, with no significant investment in the colonies since the outbreak of the Seven Years' War in 1754. The French held a number of small trading ports, including Karaikal, Yanam, Mahé and Chandernagore but the most important colony was at Pondicherry, close to Madras. Pondicherry was formidably fortified, the extensive and modern defences designed by Camille Charles Leclerc, Chevalier de Fresne, but the garrison was far too small to effectively man the walls in the face of a determined siege. The French Navy presence in the Indian Ocean at the outbreak of war comprised the two frigates Cybèle and Prudente under Contre-amiral Saint-Félix but were not based in India at all, but on the distant Île de France (modern Mauritius).

Tensions in Europe had been steadily mounting since the French Revolution of 1789 and in 1792 the French Revolutionary Wars began with war between the new French Republic and the Austrian and Prussian Empires. Great Britain was not initially engaged in this conflict, but diplomatic relations with France were rapidly deteriorating. On 1 February 1793, shortly after the execution of the deposed King Louis XVI, the French National Convention declared war on Britain and the Dutch Republic. Due to the long distances involved, it took five months for news of the outbreak of war to reach India, passing through the British consul at Alexandria, George Baldwin. On 2 June the news arrived at Madras and passed to Calcutta on 11 June. The Governor-General of India Lord Cornwallis issued instructions for operations against the territories of French India. Lord Cornwallis, brother to William, originally intended to participate in the surrender of Pondicherry himself in the seized French merchant ship Bien Aimé, but was eventually dissuaded.

== Siege of Pondicherry ==
Admiral Cornwallis was anchored at Trincomalee in Dutch Ceylon when he learned of the outbreak of war on 19 June. He immediately gave orders to sail for Pondicherry, which he placed under blockade. Shortly afterward he captured a merchant ship carrying ammunition supplies to the French port and, after a brief stop at Madras, Minerva and three accompanying East Indiamen captured the French privateer Concorde leaving Pondicherry on 3 July and seized a snow in the roads on 9 July. On 13 July sails appeared to the southeast, and Cornwallis assumed they belonged to British reinforcements. On investigation, however, this ship proved to be the 40-gun Cybèle and three smaller vessels, carrying supplies and a unit of artillerymen to Pondicherry to reinforce the garrison. On closing with the French frigate, Cornwallis discovered that the East India Company ships supporting his blockade had become scattered, and in the delay gathering them Cybèle escaped pursuit.

On land, the army at Madras was placed under the command of Colonel John Braithwaite. After assembling his forces at Wallyabad, Braithwaite marched on Pondicherry, occupying Villenore to the southwest and Arian Coupang to the south, cutting off the garrison from the supporting hinterland of the city. On 28 July, Braithwaite reached the city and established positions on the Red Hill overlooking Pondicherry, sending a demand to its commander Colonel Prosper de Chermont that he surrender. The demand was refused, and Braithwaite ordered detachments from the 71st and 74th Regiments of Foot to occupy positions to the south of the city's walls on 30 July, a manoeuvre which prompted heavy fire from the bastions. This move was however a feint, Braithwaite planned to launch his main assault on the northeast corner where the defences were weaker and the ground drier.

Attempts were then made to establish batteries to the west and north of the city, but these efforts were hampered by heavy rain, delaying the construction of defensive earthworks which allowed the garrison to maintain a constant fire on the work parties, which suffered consequent casualties. Fire was especially heavy against the siege lines to the north of the city, which were easily targeted by the French gunners on 12 August. Operations to establish batteries on this front continued for several days even as losses mounted; on 15 August, Lieutenant Colonel George Maule, Braithwaite's chief engineer, was killed by cannon fire while returning from a night inspection of the trenches. On the night of 21 August the main battery, known as the Royal Battery, came under heavy shellfire and was damaged, but repairs were successful and on the morning of 22 August its 24-pounder long guns opened return fire on the city.

Within hours of the first shots from the Royal Battery, the French defenses opposite fell silent, the only return fire coming from more distant flanking batteries. British fire intensified at noon when a battery of mortars opened a bombardment, and at 16:30 flags of truce were raised over the city's bastions. de Chermont's offer requested a 24-hour ceasefire to negotiate terms, but Braithwaite allowed only until 08:00 the following morning, during which time the construction of British earthworks would continue. de Chermont, isolated and unsupported, accepted the terms, and the following morning Braithwaite's army entered the city and took possession, although the French garrison had seized liquor supplies during the night and were too drunk to surrender formally.

== Aftermath ==
British losses during the siege of 88 killed and 131 wounded were relatively heavy; French casualties were not recorded but were thought to be negligible as few defenders were exposed to British fire during the only day of bombardment. Captured in the city were 645 French soldiers and 1,014 sepoys with 167 guns of varying sizes and materials and substantial quantities of ammunition. Elsewhere the other French Indian colonies of Karaikal, Yanam, Mahé and Chandernagore all surrendered when summoned without conflict, assuring British dominance among the European powers on the Indian Subcontinent. It has been noted that British naval forces in the Bay of Bengal were unusually weak during this period, Minerva the only warship on active operations, and had the French managed to concentrate their forces in the region they might have considerably extended the siege of Pondicherry and caused considerable damage to British merchant shipping in the region. The French made no efforts to recapture their lost Indian territories during the war, but regained them under the terms of the Peace of Amiens in 1802.
