= Pelletan =

Pelletan is a French surname. Notable people with the surname include:

- Camille Pelletan (1846–1915), French politician and journalist
- Eugène Pelletan (1813–1884), French writer, journalist and politician
- Louis Pelletan, Governor General of Pondicherry in the Second French Colonial Empire
- Philippe-Jean Pelletan (1747–1829), French surgeon and member of the French Academy of Sciences

== See also ==
- Pelletan Point, a headland of Graham Land, Antarctica
