= Lanrezac =

Lanrezac may refer to:

- Charles Lanrezac (1852 – 1925), French Army general
- Victor Louis Marie Lanrezac, Governor General of Pondicherry (1902 – 1904)
