= List of colonial governors of Gabon =

This is a list of colonial governors and other senior administrators of Gabon during the period of French rule. It includes the commanders of the Naval Division of the Western Coasts of Africa from 1839, the commandants-particular of Gabon from 1843, and subsequent senior colonial officials after the territory's incorporation into French Congo in 1886 and French Equatorial Africa in 1910. Following the establishment of the autonomous Gabonese Republic in 1958, French authority was represented by a high commissioner until Gabon became independent on 17 August 1960.

== List ==
(Dates in italics indicate de facto continuation of office)

Tenure	Incumbent	Notes
1839 to 1844	Louis Édouard Bouët, Commandant of the Naval Division of the Western Coasts of Africa	1st Term
1844 to 1845	Louis Édouard Bouët-Willaumez, Commandant of the Naval Division of the Western Coasts of Africa
1845 to 1848	Jean-Baptiste Montagniés de la Roque, Commandant of the Naval Division of the Western Coasts of Africa
1848 to 1848	Auguste Baudin, Commandant of the Naval Division of the Western Coasts of Africa	1st Term
1848 to 1850	Louis Édouard Bouët-Willaumez, Commandant of the Naval Division of the Western Coasts of Africa	2nd Term
1850 to 1851	Charles Pénaud, Commandant of the Naval Division of the Western Coasts of Africa
1851 to 1854	Auguste Baudin, Commandant of the Naval Division of the Western Coasts of Africa	2nd Term
Colony of Gorée and Dependencies
1854 to March 1856	Jérôme Félix Monléon, Commandant of the Naval Division of the Western Coasts of Africa
March 1856 to 1859	Auguste Léopold Protet, Commandant of the Naval Division of the Western Coasts of Africa
1859 to 1861	Auguste Bosse, Commandant of the Naval Division of the Western Coasts of Africa	Naval Division centred at Gabon; Gorée incorporated into Senegal
1861 to 1863	Octave François Charles, baron Didelot, Commandant of the Naval Division of the Western Coasts of Africa
1863 to 1866	André Émile Léon Laffon de Ladébat, Commandant of the Naval Division of the Western Coasts of Africa
1866 to 1868	Alphonse Jean René, vicomte Fleuriot de Langle, Commandant of the Naval Division of the Western Coasts of Africa
1868 to 1869	Alexandre François Dauriac, Commandant of the Naval Division of the Western Coasts of Africa
1869 to 1870	Victor Auguste, baron Duperré, Commandant of the Naval Division of the Western Coasts of Africa
1870 to 1872	Siméon Bourgeois, Commandant of the Naval Division of the Western Coasts of Africa
1872 to 1874	Antoine Louis Le Couriault du Quilio, Commandant of the Naval Division of the Western Coasts of Africa
1874 to 1875	Charles Henri Jules Panon du Hazier, Commandant of the Naval Division of the Western Coasts of Africa
1875 to 1877	Amédée Louis Ribourt, Commandant of the Naval Division of the Western Coasts of Africa
1877 to 1879	François Hippolyte Allemand, Commandant of the Naval Division of the Western Coasts of Africa
1879 to 1881	Bernard Ernest Mottez, Commandant of the Naval Division of the Western Coasts of Africa
1881 to 24 January 1883	Richild, baron Grivel, Commandant of the Naval Division of the Western Coasts of Africa
1884 to 1886	Jules Marie Armand Cavelier de Cuverville, Commandant of the Naval Division of the Western Coasts of Africa
1886	Incorporated into French Congo

See below for continuation 1886 to 17 August 1960

Tenure	Incumbent	Notes
French Suzerainty
1843 to 1844	Antoine Devoisins, Commandant-Particular of Gabon
1844 to 1844	Joseph Marie Millet, Commandant-Particular of Gabon
1844 to 1846	André Brisset, Commandant-Particular of Gabon	1st Term
1846 to 1846	Méquet, Commandant-Particular of Gabon
1846 to 1846	Clément Grosjean, Commandant-Particular of Gabon
1846 to 1847	Jean Carrilès, Commandant-Particular of Gabon
1847 to 1848	André Brisset, Commandant-Particular of Gabon	2nd Term
25 March 1848 to 1848	Alphonse Alexandre Sourdeaux, Commandant-Particular of Gabon
3 August 1848 to 1848	Eugène Jean Antoine Desperles, Commandant-Particular of Gabon
December 1848 to 1849	Étienne Charles Deschanel, Commandant-Particular of Gabon
10 August 1849 to 1850	Jean-Auguste Martin, Commandant-Particular of Gabon
15 December 1850 to 1853	Alexis Édouard Vignon, Commandant-Particular of Gabon	1st Term
1853 to 1854	Théophile Quillet, Commandant-Particular of Gabon
Colony of Gorée and Dependencies
1854 to 1857	Théophile Quillet, Commandant-Particular of Gabon
1857 to 1859	Alexis Édouard Vignon, Commandant-Particular of Gabon	2nd Term
1859 to 1860	Pierre Alexandre Mailhetard, Commandant-Particular of Gabon
4 August 1860 to 1861	César Charles Joseph Pradier, Commandant-Particular of Gabon
1861 to 1863	Paul Claude Nicolas Brue, Commandant-Particular of Gabon
1863 to 1866	Charles Ferdinand Eugène Baur, Commandant-Particular of Gabon
1866 to 1867	Joseph Henri Brunet-Millet, Commandant-Particular of Gabon
1867 to 1868	Théophile Aube, Commandant-Particular of Gabon
1868 to 1869	Frédéric Amable Bourgarel, Commandant-Particular of Gabon
1869 to 1871	Hippolyte Adrien Bourgin, Commandant-Particular of Gabon
1871 to 1873	Gustave Aristide Léopold Garraud, Commandant-Particular of Gabon
1873 to 1875	Charles Henri Jules Panon du Hazier, Commandant-Particular of Gabon
1875 to 1876	Félix Ambroise Clément, Commandant-Particular of Gabon
1876 to 1879	Paul-Michel-Frédéric Caudière, Commandant-Particular of Gabon
1879 to 1880	Augustin Ernest Dumont, Commandant-Particular of Gabon
1880 to 1881	Jules Émile Hanet-Cléry, Commandant-Particular of Gabon
1881 to 1883	Émile Masson, Commandant-Particular of Gabon
1883 to 1885	Jean Joseph Cornut-Gentille, Commandant-Particular of Gabon
1885 to 1886	Georges Émile Pradier, Commandant-Particular of Gabon
Incorporated into French Congo
29 June 1886 to 12 March 1889	Noël Ballay, Lieutenant Governor
12 March 1889 to 1 June 1894	Charles de Chavannes, Lieutenant Governor
1 June 1894 to 22 January 1899	Albert Dolisie, Lieutenant Governor
1 May 1899 to 1902	Émile Gentil, Lieutenant Governor
21 January 1904 to 19 April 1905	Louis Auguste Bertrand Ormières, Lieutenant Governor
19 April 1905 to 5 August 1905	Paul Cousturier, acting Lieutenant Governor
5 August 1905 to 27 April 1906	Alfred Fourneau, acting Lieutenant Governor
27 April 1906 to 23 April 1907	Charles Henri Adrien Noufflard, acting Lieutenant Governor
23 April 1907 to 26 April 1907	Alfred Martineau, Lieutenant Governor
26 April 1907 to 20 January 1909	Édouard Émile Léon Telle, acting Lieutenant Governor
20 January 1909 to 10 February 1909	Frédéric Claude Weber, acting Lieutenant Governor
10 February 1909 to 9 November 1909	Charles Amédée Rognon, acting Lieutenant Governor
9 November 1909 to 15 January 1910	Léon Félix Richaud, acting Lieutenant Governor
Incorporated into French Equatorial Africa
15 January 1910 to June 1911	Léon Félix Richaud, acting Lieutenant Governor
June 1911 to 21 February 1912	Georges Poulet, Lieutenant Governor
21 February 1912 to 18 April 1914	Paul Pierre Adam, acting Lieutenant Governor
18 April 1914 to 1 June 1917	Joseph Guyon, Lieutenant Governor
1 June 1917 to 12 June 1918	Georges Thomann, acting Lieutenant Governor
12 June 1918 to 30 June 1919	Maurice Pierre Lapalud, Lieutenant Governor
30 June 1919 to 13 April 1920	Jean Henri Marchand, acting Lieutenant Governor
13 April 1920 to 29 May 1922	Jean Henri Marchand, Lieutenant Governor
29 May 1922 to 15 June 1923	Edmond Émilien Cadier, acting Lieutenant Governor
15 June 1923 to 29 July 1924	Louis Nicolas Marie Cercus, acting Lieutenant Governor
29 July 1924 to 19 June 1931	Marie Joseph Jules Pierre Bernard, Lieutenant Governor
19 June 1931 to November 1931	Louis Vingarassamy, acting Lieutenant Governor
November 1931 to 26 September 1934	Louis Bonvin, Lieutenant Governor
26 September 1934 to 24 October 1936	Louis Bonvin, Administrator-Superior
24 October 1936 to 11 September 1937	Louis Bonvin, Governor-Delegate
11 September 1937 to 29 August 1938	Georges Parisot, Governor-Delegate
29 August 1938 to 2 November 1939	Georges Pierre Masson, acting Governor-Delegate
2 November 1939 to 14 November 1940	Georges Pierre Masson, Governor-Delegate
14 November 1940 to 15 March 1941	André Parant, acting Governor-Delegate
26 March 1941 to 30 May 1942	Victor Valentin Smith, Governor
30 May 1942 to 26 August 1943	Charles André Maurice Assier de Pompignan, Governor
26 August 1943 to 19 November 1944	Paul Vuillaume, Governor
19 November 1944 to 28 March 1946	Numa Sadoul, acting Governor	1st Term
28 March 1946 to 31 December 1947	Roland Pré, Governor
31 December 1947 to 6 April 1949	Numa Sadoul, Governor	2nd Term
6 April 1949 to 4 January 1950	Pierre François Pelieu, acting Governor
4 January 1950 to 19 October 1951	Pierre François Pelieu, Governor
19 October 1951 to 25 April 1952	Charles Hanin, acting Governor
25 April 1952 to 29 January 1958	Yves Digo, Governor
29 January 1958 to 28 November 1958	Louis Sanmarco, Governor
autonomous Gabonese Republic
28 November 1958 to July 1959	Louis Sanmarco, High Commissioner
July 1959 to 17 August 1960	Jean Risterucci, High Commissioner
17 August 1960	Independence as Republic of Gabon

For continuation after independence, see: Heads of State of Gabon

== See also ==
- Gabon
  - Heads of State of Gabon
- Lists of incumbents
