= French India =

French colony on the Indian subcontinent (1664–1954)

French Settlements in India Établissements français dans l'Inde (French)
- 1664–1954
- Flag

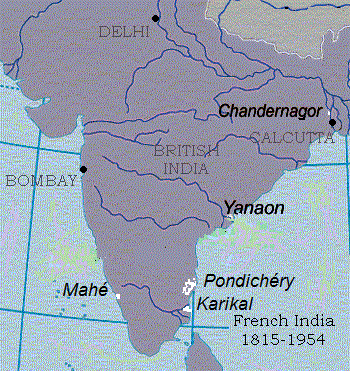
- French India after 1815
- Status: Colony of France (1664–1946); Overseas Territory of France (1946–1954)
- Capital: Pondichéry
- Common languages: French (de jure); Bengali; Malayalam; Tamil; Telugu
- Governor
  - 1668–1673: François Caron (first)
  - 1954: Georges Escaragueil
- Legislature: Representative Assembly of French India
- History
  - First French East India Company Commissioner of Surat: 1664
  - De facto transfer: 1 November 1954

Area
- 1936: 510 km^{2} (200 sq mi)

Population
  - 1936: 298,861
- Currency: French Indian rupee
Preceded by	Succeeded by
Portuguese Empire	Puducherry (union territory); West Bengal
- Today part of: India

French India, formally the Établissements français dans l'Inde (Note: In France, it was popularly known as les Comptoirs de l'Inde. Strictly speaking though, a comptoir is a trading station, whereas the five French settlements were entire towns with the surrounding area, and not mere trading stations.) (French pronunciation: [etablismɑ̃ fʁɑ̃se dɑ̃ l ͜ ɛ̃d]; English: French Settlements in India), was a French colony comprising five geographically separated enclaves on the Indian subcontinent that had initially been factories of the French East India Company. They were de facto incorporated into the Republic of India in 1950 and 1954. The enclaves were Pondichéry, Karikal, Yanaon on the Coromandel Coast, Mahé on the Malabar Coast and Chandernagor in Bengal. The French also possessed several loges ('lodges', tiny subsidiary trading stations) inside other towns, but after 1816, the British denied all French claims to these, which were not reoccupied.

By 1950, the total area measured 510 km^{2} (200 sq mi), of which 293 km^{2} (113 sq mi) belonged to the territory of Pondichéry. In 1936, the population of the colony totalled 298,851 inhabitants, of which 63% (187,870) lived in the territory of Pondichéry.

== Background ==
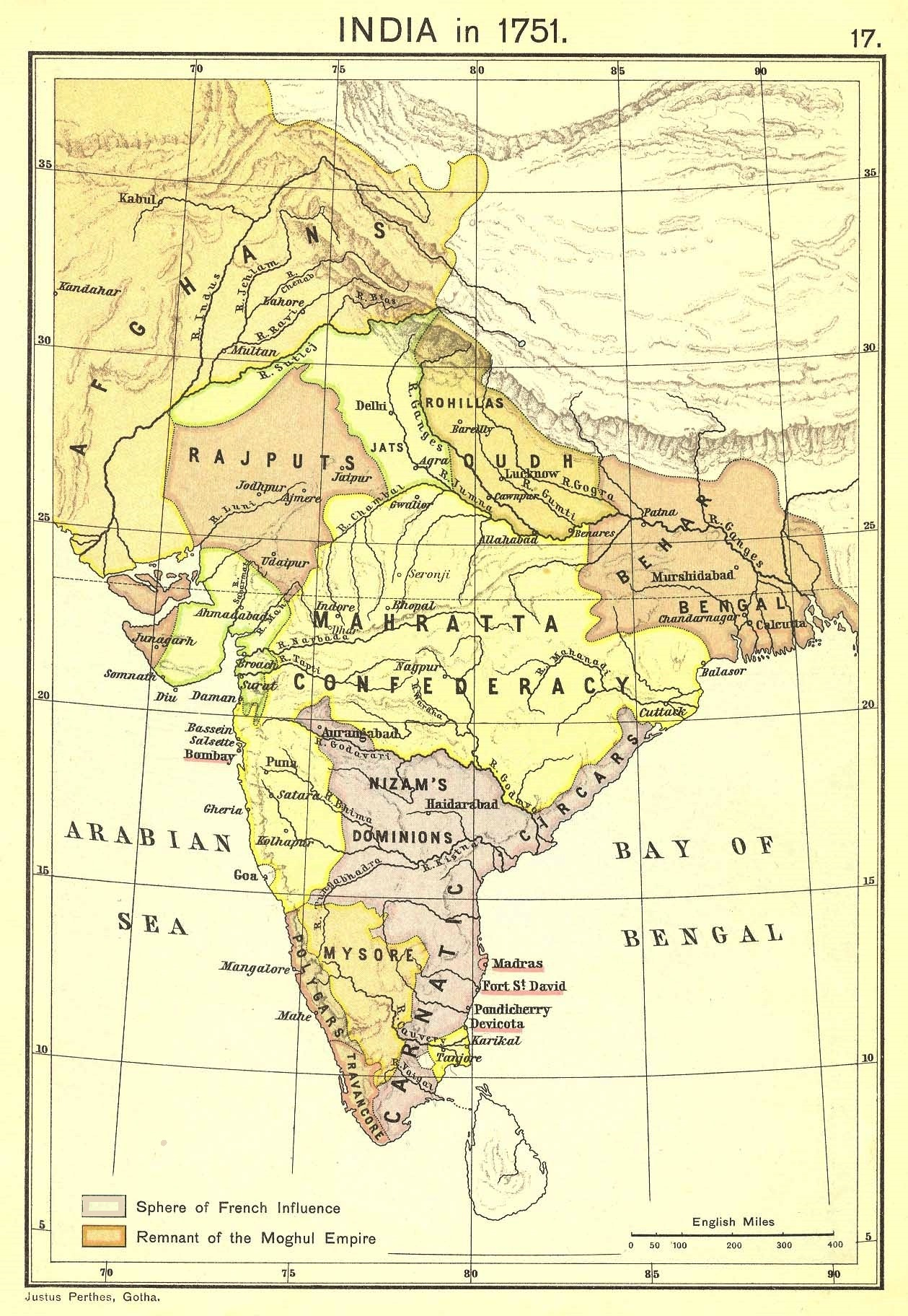
India at the height of French influence (1751)

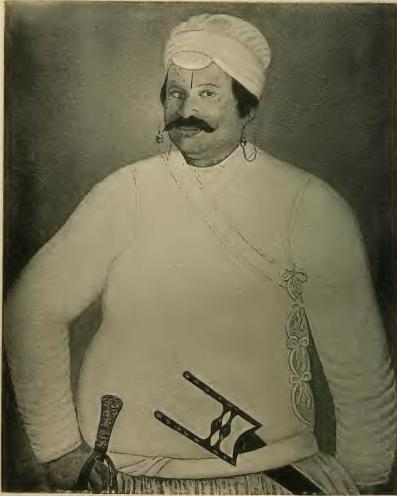
A portrait of Ananda Ranga Pillai

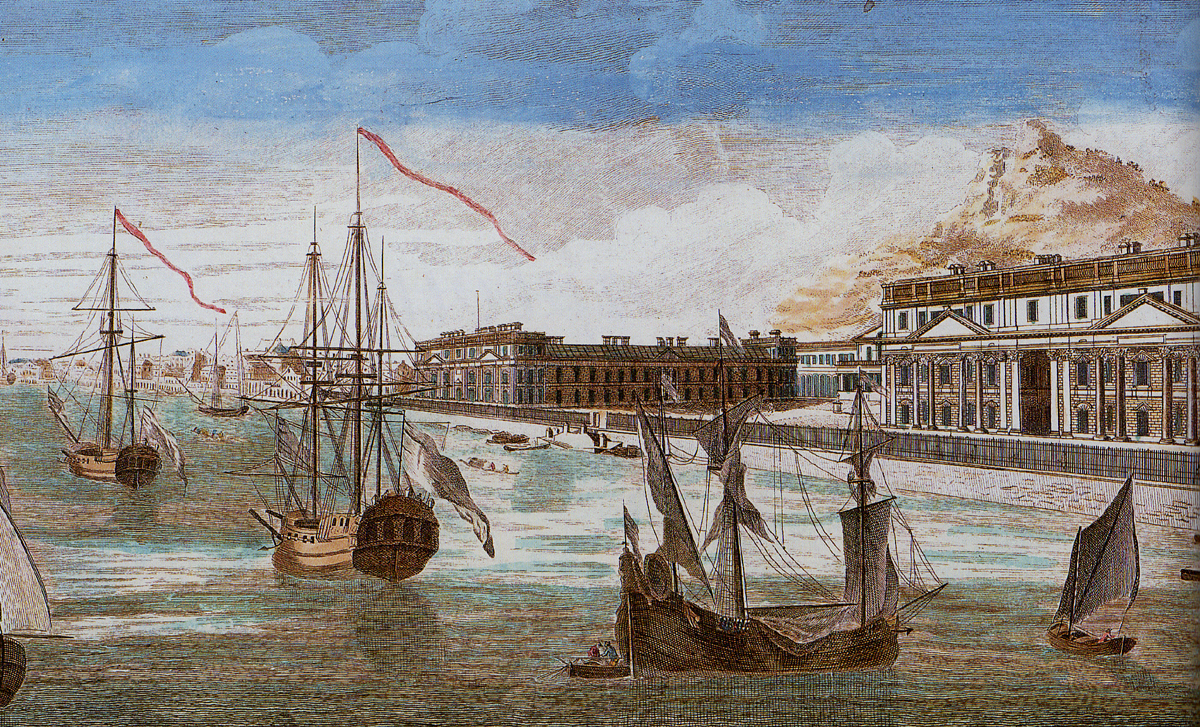
View of Pondicherry in the late 18th century

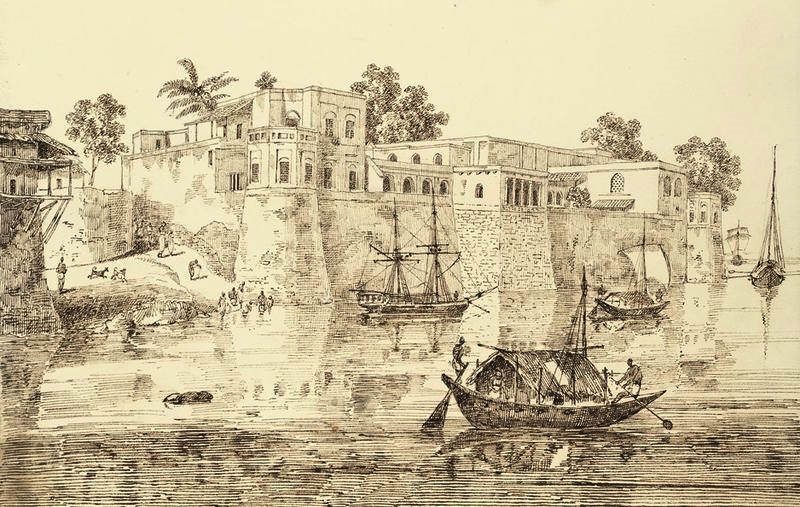
French factory (trading post) at Patna on the Ganges

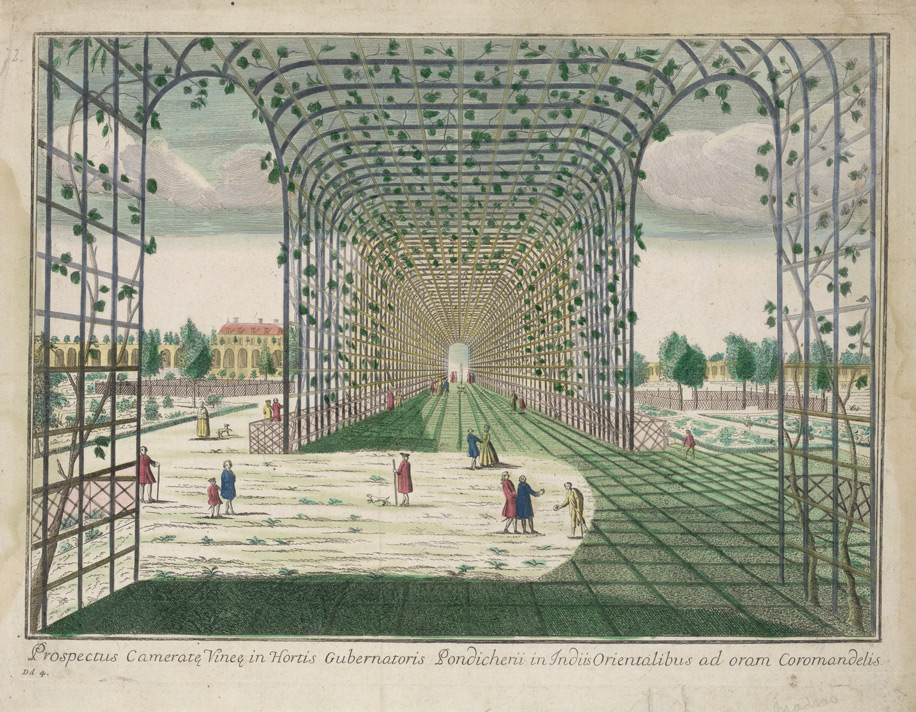
Governor's Garden at Pondicherry, 18th century

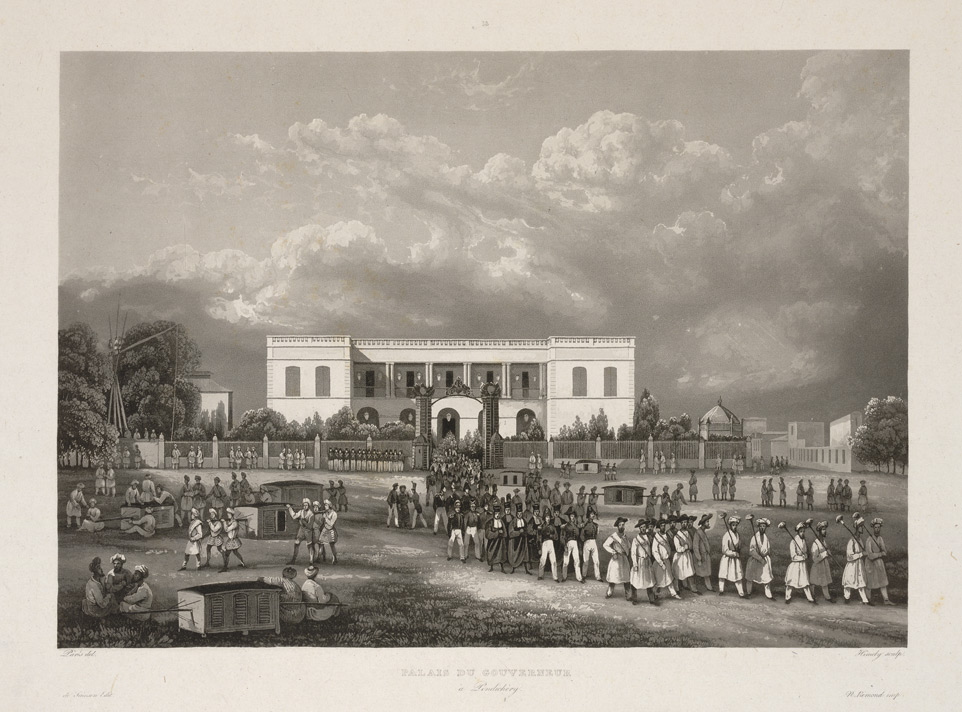
View of the Palace of the Governor of Pondicherry in 1850

France was the last of the major European maritime powers of the 17th century to enter the East India trade. Six decades after the foundation of the English and Dutch East India companies (in 1600 and 1602 respectively), and at a time when both companies were multiplying factories (trading posts) on the shores of India, the French still did not have a viable trading company or a single permanent establishment in the East.

Seeking to explain France's late entrance in the East India trade, historians cite geopolitical circumstances such as the inland position of the French capital, France's numerous internal customs barriers, and parochial perspectives of merchants on France's Atlantic coast, who had little appetite for the large-scale investment required to develop a viable trading enterprise with the distant East Indies.

== History ==
=== Initial marine voyages to India (16th century) ===
The first French commercial venture to India is believed to have taken place in the first half of the 16th century, in the reign of King Francis I, when two ships were fitted out by some merchants of Rouen to trade in eastern seas; they sailed from Le Havre and were never heard of again. In 1604, a company was granted letters patent by King Henry IV, but the project failed. Fresh letters patent were issued in 1615, and two ships went to India, only one returning.

La Compagnie française des Indes orientales (French East India Company) was formed under the auspices of Cardinal Richelieu (1642) and reconstructed under Jean-Baptiste Colbert (1664) when he sent an expedition to Madagascar.

=== First factory in India (1668) ===
In 1667, the French India Company sent out another expedition, under the command of François Caron (who was accompanied by a Persian named Marcara), which reached Surat in 1668 and established the first French factory in India.

=== French expansion in India (1669-1672) ===
In 1669, Marcara succeeded in establishing another French factory at Masulipatam. In 1672, the French captured Fort Saint Thomas, but they were driven out by the Dutch after a long and costly siege. Chandernagore (present-day Chandannagar) was established in 1692, with the permission of Nawab Shaista Khan, the Mughal governor of Bengal. In 1673, the French acquired the area of Pondicherry from the qiladar of Valikondapuram under the Sultan of Bijapur, and thus the foundation of Pondichéry was laid. By 1720, the French had lost their factories at Surat, Masulipatam and Bantam to the British East India Company.

=== Establishment of the colony at Pondichéry (1673) ===
On 4 February 1673, Bellanger de l'Espinay, a French officer, took up residence in the Danish Lodge in Pondichéry, thereby commencing the French administration of Pondichéry. In 1674, François Martin, the first Governor, initiated ambitious projects to transform Pondichéry from a small fishing village into a flourishing port-town. However, the French found themselves in continual conflict with the Dutch and the English. In 1693, the Dutch captured Pondichéry and augmented the fortifications. The French regained the town in 1699 through the Treaty of Ryswick, signed on 20 September 1697.

=== Establishment of colonies at Yanon (1723) and Karaikal (1739) ===
From their arrival until 1741, the objectives of the French, like those of the British, were purely commercial. During this period, the French East India Company peacefully acquired Yanam (about 840 kilometres or 520 miles north-east of Pondichéry on Andhra Coast) in 1723, Mahe on Malabar Coast in 1725 and Karaikal (about 150 kilometres or 93 miles south of Pondichéry) in 1739. In the early 18th century, the town of Pondichéry was laid out on a grid pattern and grew considerably. Able governors like Pierre Christophe Le Noir (1726–1735) and Pierre Benoît Dumas (1735–1741) expanded the Pondichéry area and made it a large and rich town.

=== Ambition of establishment of French territorial empire in India and defeat (1741–1754) ===
Soon after his arrival in 1741, the most famous governor of French India, Joseph François Dupleix, began to hold the ambition of a French territorial empire in India in spite of the pronounced uninterested attitude of his distant superiors and of the French government, which did not want to provoke the British. Dupleix's ambition clashed with British interests in India and a period of military skirmishes and political intrigues began and continued even in rare periods when France and Great Britain were officially at peace. Under the command of the Marquis de Bussy-Castelnau, Dupleix's army successfully controlled the area between Hyderabad and Cape Comorin. However, Robert Clive, a British officer, arrived in India in 1744, and dashed the hopes of Dupleix to create a French empire in India.

After a defeat and failed peace talks, Dupleix was summarily dismissed and recalled to France in 1754.

=== French vs British intrigues (1754–1871) ===
In spite of a treaty between the British and French agreeing not to interfere in regional Indian affairs, their colonial intrigues continued. The French expanded their influence at the court of the Nawab of Bengal and increased their trading activity in Bengal. In 1756, the French encouraged the Nawab (Siraj ud-Daulah) to attack and take the British Fort William in Calcutta. This led to the Battle of Plassey in 1757, where the British decisively defeated the Nawab and his French allies, resulting in the extension of British power over the entire province of Bengal.

Subsequently, France sent Lally-Tollendal to recover the lost French possessions and drive the British out of India. Lally arrived in Pondichéry in 1758, had some initial success and razed Fort St. David in Cuddalore District to the ground in 1758, but strategic mistakes by Lally led to the loss of the Hyderabad region, the Battle of Wandiwash and the siege of Pondicherry in 1760. In 1761, the British razed Pondichéry to the ground in revenge for the French depredations; it lay in ruins for four years. The French had lost their hold now in South India too.

In 1765, Pondichéry was returned to France in accordance with a 1763 peace treaty with Britain. Governor Jean Law de Lauriston set to rebuild the town on its former layout and after five months 200 European and 2000 Tamil houses had been erected. In 1769, the French East India Company, unable to support itself financially, was abolished by the French Crown, which assumed administration of the French possessions in India. During the next 50 years, Pondichéry changed hands between France and Britain with the regularity of their wars and peace treaties.

In 1816, after the conclusion of the Napoleonic Wars, the five establishments of Pondichéry, Chandernagore, Karaikal, Mahe and Yanam and the lodges at Machilipatnam, Kozhikode and Surat were returned to France. Pondichéry had lost much of its former glory, and Chandernagore dwindled into an insignificant outpost to the north of the rapidly growing British metropolis of Calcutta. Successive governors tried, with mixed results, to improve infrastructure, industry, law and education over the next 138 years.

A list from 1816 mentions the French had the possessions of Pondichéry (and its districts of Villenour and Bahour), Karikal, Yanaon, Chandernagor and Mahé. Other important trading posts included the ones in Masulipatnam, Calicut, Surat, Muscat, Mokha and Canton.

By a decree of 25 January 1871, French India was to have an elective general council (conseil général) and elective local councils (conseil local). The results of this measure were not very satisfactory, and the qualifications for and the classes of the franchise were modified. The governor resided at Pondichéry and was assisted by a council. There were two tribunaux d'instance ('tribunals of first instance', at Pondichéry and Karikal) one cour d'appel ('Court of Appeal', at Pondichéry) and five juges de paix ('Justices of the Peace'). Agricultural production consisted of rice, peanuts, tobacco, betel nuts and vegetables.

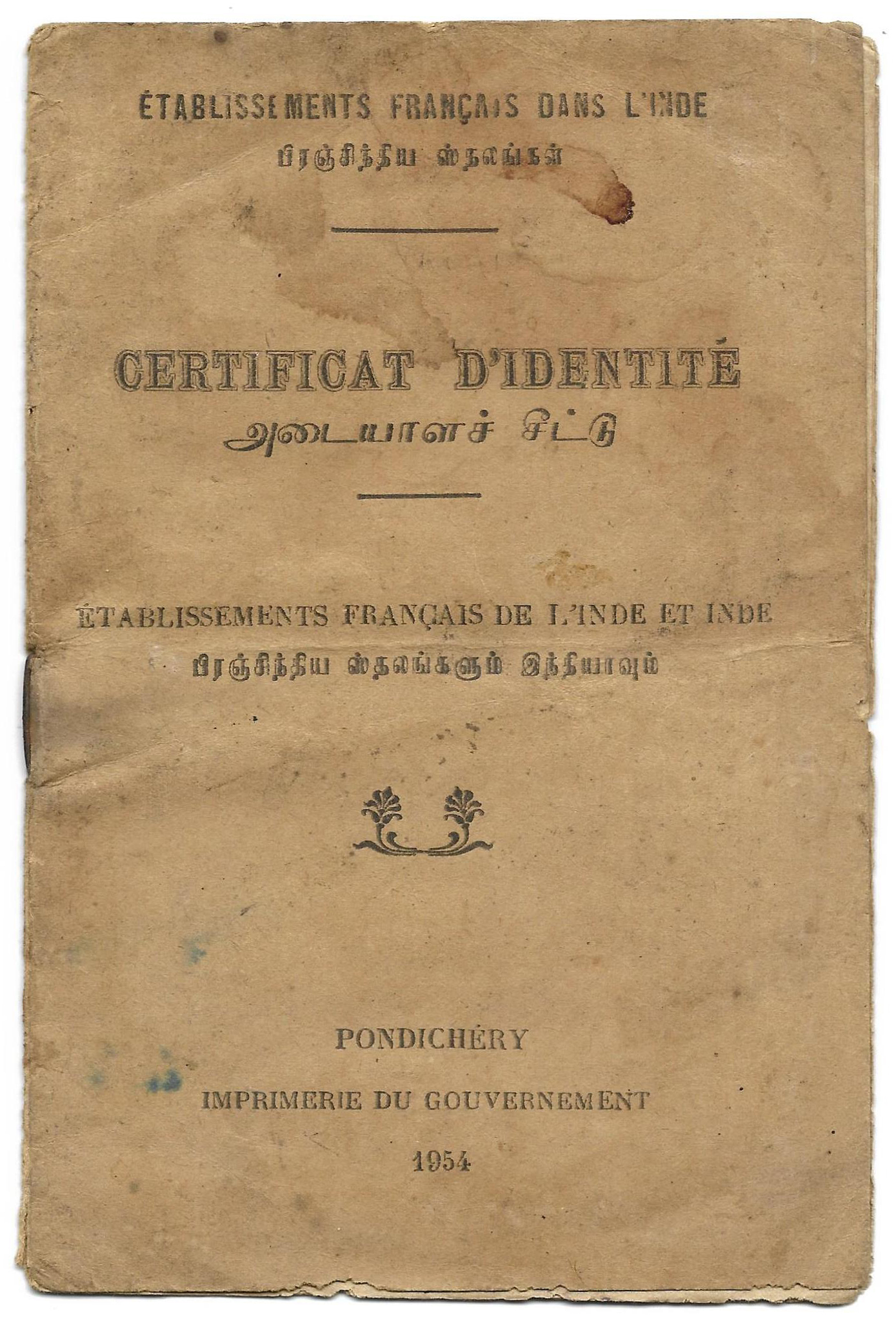
1954 French ID issued at their colony of Pondicherry before the transfer.

=== Independence movement (18th–20th century) and merger with India (1954) ===
French establishments and loges as of 1947
Bengal Coromandel coast Gujarat Malabar coast Orissa

The Independence of India on 15 August 1947 gave impetus to the union of France's Indian possessions with former British India. The lodges in Machilipatnam, Kozhikode and Surat were ceded to India on 6 October 1947. An agreement between France and India in 1948 agreed to an election in France's remaining Indian possessions to choose their political future. Governance of Chandernagore was ceded to India on 2 May 1950; it was then merged with West Bengal state on 2 October 1954. On 1 November 1954, the four enclaves of Pondichéry, Yanam, Mahe– and Karikal were de facto transferred to the Indian Union and became the Union Territory of Puducherry. The de jure union of French India with India did not take place until 1962 when the French Parliament in Paris ratified the treaty with India.

=== The myth of a lost French empire in India ===
From the mid-19th century onward there developed in France the belief that the five tiny settlements recovered from Britain after the Napoleonic Wars were remnants of the "immense empire" acquired by Dupleix in the 18th century. "Our immense empire of India was reduced to five settlements" wrote French economist and colonial expansion promoter Pierre Paul Leroy-Beaulieu in 1886. An atlas published in the 1930s described those five settlements as "remnants of the great colonial empire that France had created in India in the 18th century". More recently, a historian of French India post-1816 described them as "debris of an empire" and the "last remnants of an immense empire forever lost". However, France never held much more than the five settlements recovered in 1816. The historian of French India and archivist Alfred Martineau, who was also governor of French India, pointed out that the authority granted to Dupleix over the Carnatic in 1750 should not be construed as a transfer of sovereignty, as wrote most historians, given that Dupleix only became so to speak the lieutenant of the Indian subah, who could withdraw his power delegation at his convenience. Philippe Haudrère, historian of the French East India Company, also wrote that Dupleix controlled those territories through a complex system of treaties and alliances, a system almost feudal in nature, territories guarded by garrisons with French commanders, but neither annexed nor transformed into protectorates.

== List of French settlements in India ==
French establishments in the Indian peninsula as of 1839 were:

1. On the Coromandel coast,
  - Pondichéry and its territory comprising districts of Pondichéry, Villenour and Bahour;
  - Karikal and its dependent maganams, or districts.
2. On the coast of Andhra Pradesh,
  - Yanaon and its territory comprising dependent aldées or villages;
  - The Masulipatam lodge (Note: The French Factory at Masulipatam was founded in 1669) and a garden named Francepeth. (Note: It is the largest and most significant loge among all others and was located on the outskirts of Masulipatam. It included two bungalows, a chapel and some other buildings. Its total area is around 61 acres (0.28sqkm).)
3. On the Malabar coast,
  - Mahé and its territory;
  - The Calicut lodge. (Note: This French Loge was within the British-held Calicut town and consisted of 6 acres on the seashore about half a mile north of the Calicut Lighthouse and adjoins the old district jail site.)
4. In Bengal,
  - Chandernagore and its territory;
  - The five lodges of Cassimbazar, (Note: This factory supplied silk goods cargoes and situated in the heart of silk belt.) Jougdia, (Note: This factory supplied ordinary fabrics to the French East India Company. It was established in 1735 by Dupleix.) Dacca, (Note: This factory exported muslins of 4 lakh rupees per annum by the mid-eighteen century. It was founded in 1722.) Balasore (Note: This factory was founded at the end of the seventeenth century but suffered from a lack of proper road transport and it lost its commercial activity during the next century.) and Patna. (Note: This factory used to sell drapes from Europe and bought saltpetre and opium. It was founded in 1727.)
5. In Gujarat,
  - Surat factory. (Note: This factory was founded in 1668 after securing a firman and a factory site from Emperor Aurangzeb.)

Under the French East India Company's regime, the name 'lodge' was given to factories or insulated establishments consisting of a home and adjacent ground where France had the right to fly its flag and establish trading posts.

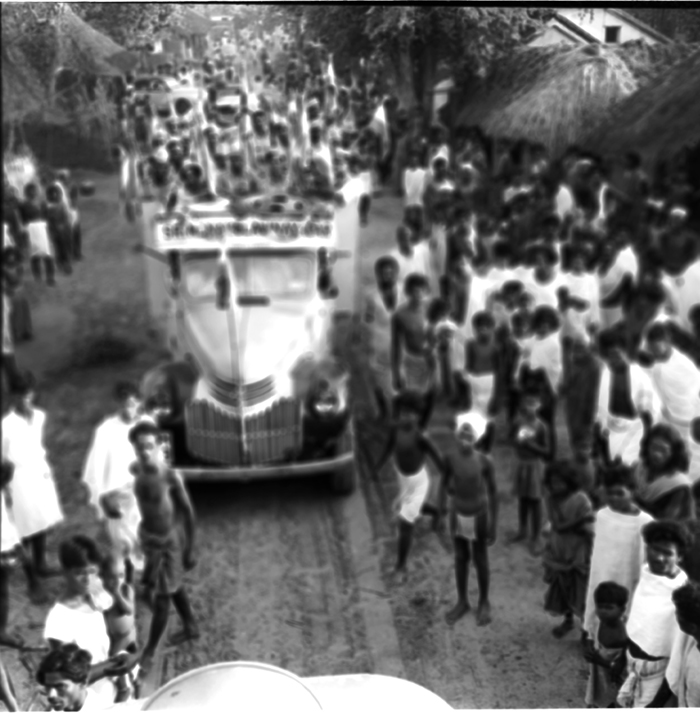
Pro-merger movement of French Settlements in India, 1954

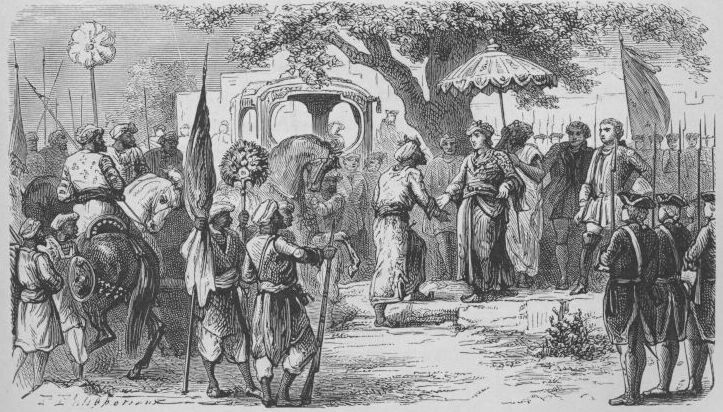
Dupleix meeting the Soudhabar of the Deccan, Muzaffar Jang Hidayat

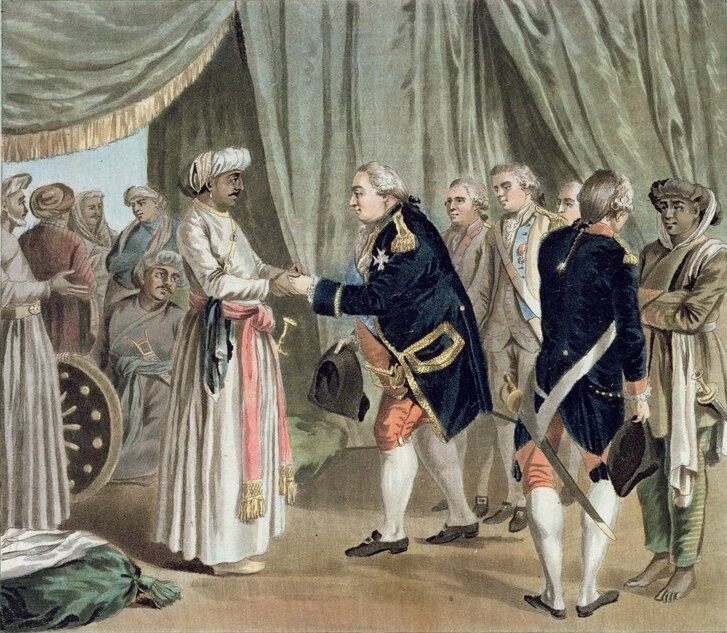
Suffren meeting with ally Hyder Ali in 1782, J. B. Morret engraving, 1789

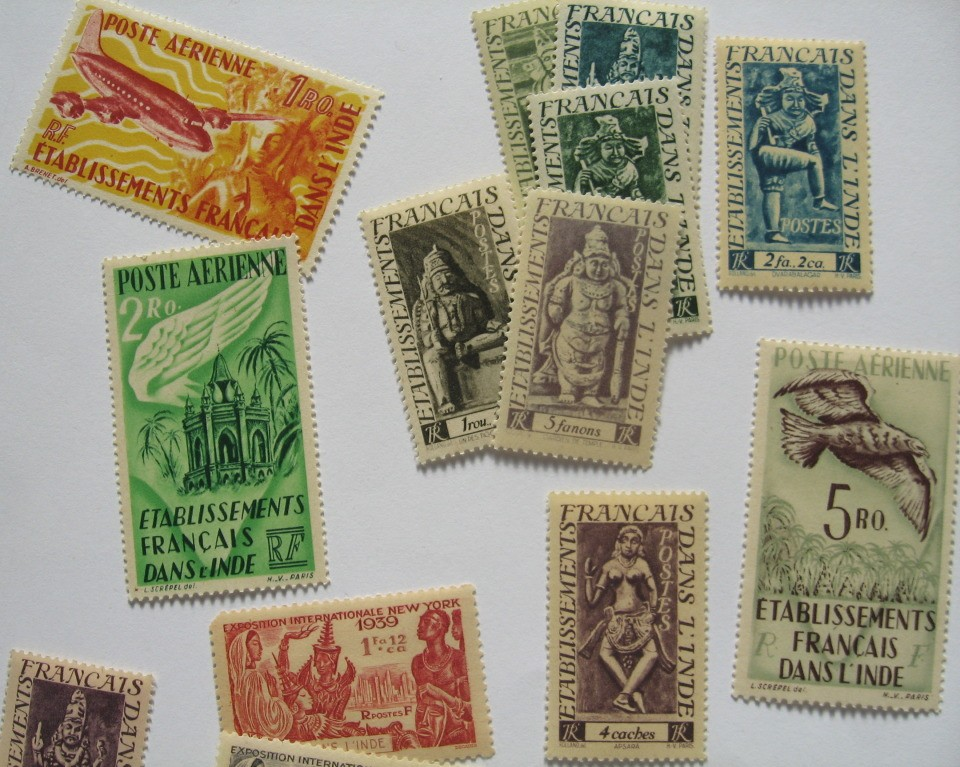
French India postage stamps

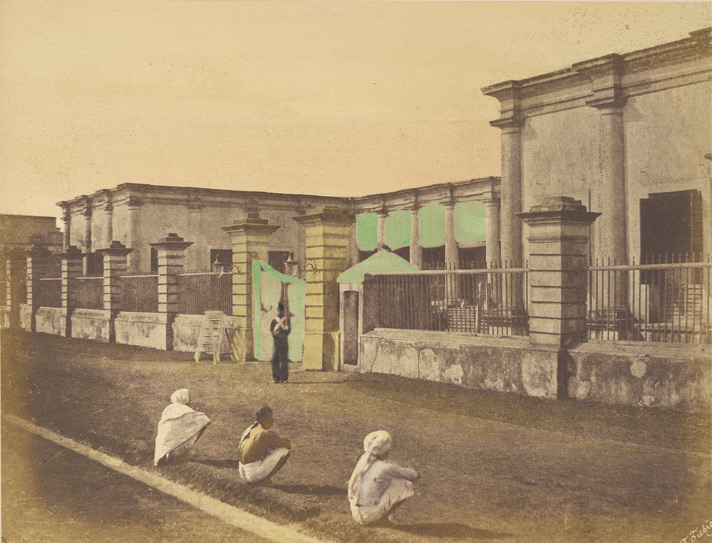
Chandernagore's Government House c. 1850

== List of chief governing officers ==
=== Commissioners ===
- François Caron, 1668–1672
- François Baron, 1672–1681
- François Martin, 1681 – November 1693
- Dutch occupation, September 1693 – September 1699 — Treaty of Ryswick (1697)

=== Governors ===
In the days of the French East India Company, the title of the top official was most of the time Governor of Pondicherry and General Commander of the French settlements in the East Indies (French: Gouverneur de Pondichéry et commandant général des établissements français aux Indes orientales). After 1816, it was Governor of French establishments in India (French: Gouverneur des établissements français de l'Inde').

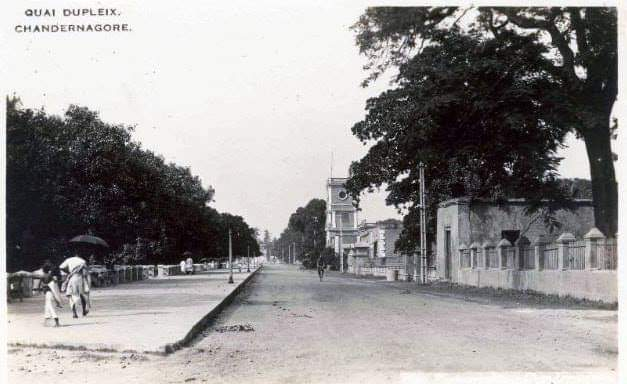
Quai Dupleix at Strand Road Chandernagor

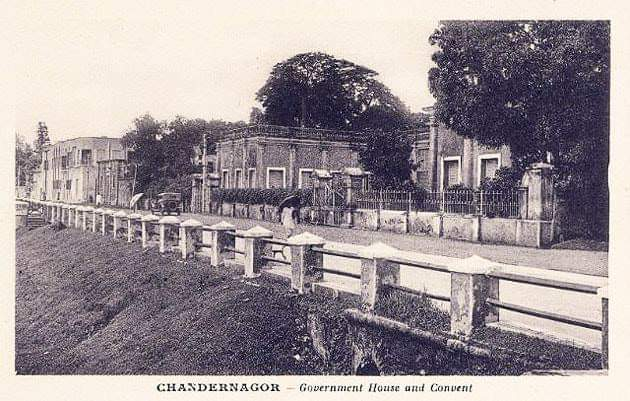
Chandernagore Government House and Convent

- François Martin, September 1699 – 31 December 1706
- Pierre Dulivier (Acting), January 1707 – July 1708
- Guillaume André d'Hébert, 1708–1712
- Pierre Dulivier, 1713–1715
- Guillaume André d'Hébert, 1715–1718
- Pierre André Prévost de La Prévostière, August 1718 – 11 October 1721
- Pierre Christoph Le Noir (Acting), 1721–1723
- Joseph Beauvollier de Courchant, 1723–1726
- Pierre Christoph Le Noir, 1727–1734
- Pierre Benoît Dumas, 1735–1741
- Joseph François Dupleix, 14 January 1742 – 15 October 1754
- Charles Godeheu, Le commissaire (Acting), 15 October 1754 – 1754
- Georges Duval de Leyrit, 1756–1758
- Thomas Arthur, comte de Lally, 1758 – January 1761
- First British occupation, January 15, 1761 – June 25, 1765 — Treaty of Paris (1763)
- Jean Law de Lauriston, 1765–1766
- Antoine Boyellau (Acting), 1766–1767
- Jean Law de Lauriston, 1767 – January 1777
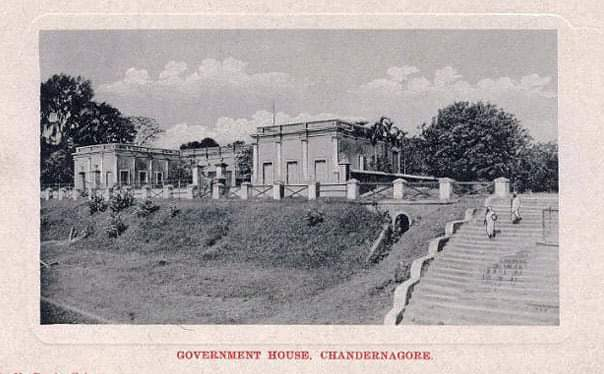
  Chandernagor Government House
- Guillaume de Bellecombe, January 1777 – 1778
- Second British occupation, 1778 – 1783 – Treaty of Paris (1783)
- Marquis de Bussy-Castelnau, 1783–1785
- François de Souillac, 1785
- David Charpentier de Cossigny, October 1785 – 1787
- Thomas Conway, October 1787 – 1789
- Camille Charles Leclerc, Chevalier de Fresne, 1789–1792
- Dominique Prosper de Chermont, November 1792 – 1793
- L. Leroux de Touffreville, 1793
- Third British occupation, 23 August 1793 – 18 June 1802 — Treaty of Amiens (1802)
- Charles Mathieu Isidore Decaen, 18 June 1802 – August 1803
- Louis Binot, 1803
- Fourth British occupation, August 1803 – 26 September 1816 — Treaty of Paris (1814)
- André Julien, Comte Dupuy, 26 September 1816 – October 1825
- Joseph Cordier, Marie Emmanuel (Acting), October 1825 – 19 June 1826
- Eugène Desbassayns de Richemont, 1826 – 2 August 1828
- Joseph Cordier, Marie Emmanuel (Acting), 2 August 1828 – 11 April 1829
- Auguste Jacques Nicolas Peureux de Mélay, 11 April 1829 – 3 May 1835
- Henri Jean de Rouvroy, Marquis of Saint-Simon, 3 May 1835 – April 1840
- Paul de Nourquer du Camper, April 1840 – 1844
- Louis Pujol, 1844–1849
- Hyacinthe Marie de Lalande de Calan, 1849–1850
- Philippe Achille Bédier, 1851–1852
- Raymond de Saint-Maur, August 1852 – April 1857
- Alexandre Durand d'Ubraye, April 1857 – January 1863
- Napoléon Joseph Louis Bontemps, January 1863 – June 1871
- Antoine-Léonce Michaux, June 1871 – November 1871
- Pierre Aristide Faron, November 1871 – 1875
- Adolphe Trillard, 1875–1878
- Léonce Laugier, February 1879 – April 1881
- Théodore Drouhet, 1881 – October 1884
- Étienne Richaud, October 1884 – 1886
- Édouard Manès, 1886–1888
- Georges Jules Piquet, 1888–1889
- Louis Hippolyte Marie Nouet, 1889–1891
- Léon Émile Clément-Thomas, 1891–1896
- Louis Jean Girod, 1896 – February 1898
- François Pierre Rodier, February 1898 – 11 January 1902
- Louis Pelletan (Acting), 11 January 1902
- Victor Louis Marie Lanrezac, 1902–1904
- Philema Lemaire, August 1904 – April 1905
- Joseph Pascal François, April 1905 – October 1906
- Gabriel Louis Angoulvant, October 1906 – 3 December 1907
- Adrien Jules Jean Bonhoure, 1908–1909
- Ernest Fernand Lévecque, 1909 – 9 July 1910
- Alfred Albert Martineau, 9 July 1910 – July 1911
- Pierre Louis Alfred Duprat, July 1911 – November 1913
- Alfred Albert Martineau, November 1913 – 29 June 1918
- Pierre Étienne Clayssen (Acting), 29 June 1918 – 21 February 1919
- Louis Martial Innocent Gerbinis, 21 February 1919 – 11 February 1926
- Henri Léo Eugène Lagroua (Acting), 11 February 1926 – 5 August 1926
- Pierre Jean Henri Didelot, 1926–1928
- Robert Paul Marie de Guise, 1928–1931
- Adrien Juvanon, 1931–1934
- Léon Solomiac, August 1934 – 1936
- Horace Valentin Crocicchia, 1936–1938
- Louis Bonvin, 26 September 1938 – 1945
- Nicolas Ernest Marie Maurice Jeandin, 1945–1946
- Charles François Marie Baron, 20 March 1946 – 20 August 1947

French India became an Overseas territory (French: territoire d'outre-mer) of France in 1946.

=== Commissioners ===
- Charles François Marie Baron, 20 August 1947 – May 1949
- Charles Chambon, May 1949 – 31 July 1950
- André Ménard, 31 July 1950 – October 1954
- Georges Escargueil, October 1954 – 1 November 1954

French India de facto transferred to the Republic of India in 1954.

=== High Commissioners ===
The first High Commissioner, Kewal Singh Choudhary was appointed immediately after the Kizhoor referendum on 21 October 1954 as per Foreign Jurisdiction Act, 1947. The Chief Commissioner had the powers of the former French commissioner, but was under the direct control of the Union Government.

The list of Chief Commissioners is given below

No.	Name	Took office	Left office
1	Kewal Singh Choudhary	21 October 1954	16 November 1956
2	Moti Kripalani	17 November 1956	27 August 1958
3	Lal Ram Saran Singh	30 August 1958	8 February 1961
4	Sisir Kumar Dutta	2 May 1961	1 August 1963
5	K. J. Somasundaram	2 August 1963	13 October 1963

== See also ==
- Apostolic Prefecture of French Colonies in India (Catholic mission)
  - Paris Foreign Missions Society
- British Raj
- Colonial India
- Coup d'état of Yanaon
- Danish India
- Dutch India
- Municipal administration in French India
- Portuguese India
- Bourbons of India, a supposed branch of the House of Bourbon from Bhopal
- France–India relations
  - Franco-Indian alliances
- Jacobin Club of Mysore
- François Bernier, French explorer, diplomat to the court of Aurangzeb, and early proponent of scientific racism
- Orientalism in early modern France
  - Indienne

== Bibliography ==
- Sudipta Das (1992). Myths and realities of French imperialism in India, 1763–1783. New York: P. Lang. ISBN 0820416762. 459pp.
