= Suttukeni =

Coordinates: 12.015702650°N 79.676175654°E

Suttukeni Suthukeni Souttoukeny
- town
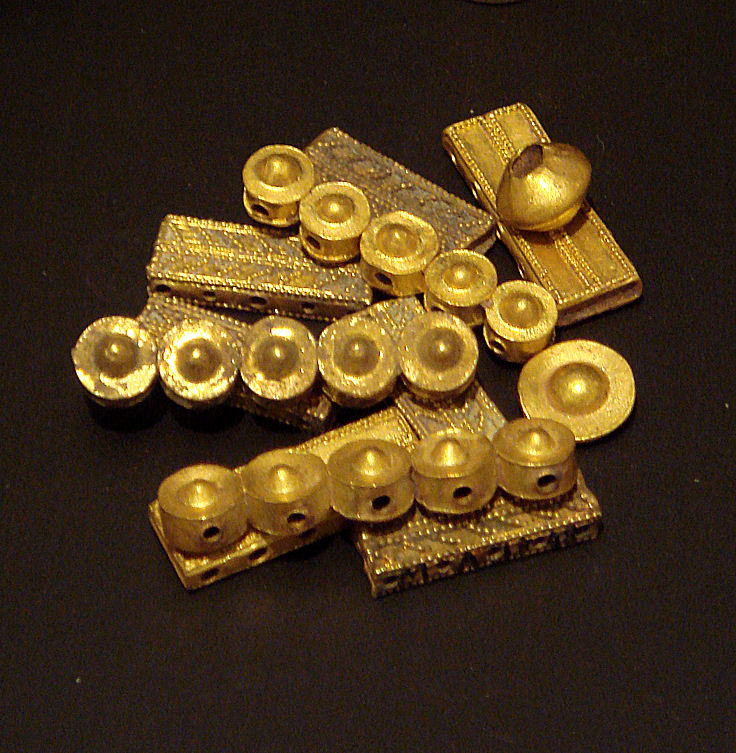
- Suttukeny jewellery, from the 2nd century BCE, at the Musée Guimet.
- Interactive map of Suttukeni
- Country: India
- State: Puducherry
- District: Pondicherry

Languages
  - Official: French, Tamil, English
- Time zone: UTC+5:30 (IST)
- Vehicle registration: PY
- Nearest city: Pondicherry
- Lok Sabha constituency: Puducherry
- Vidhan Sabha constituency: Mannadipet

Suttukeni, named Souttoukeny in French, is a village near Katterikuppam (Tamil : காட்டேறிக்குப்பம் ) in Puducherry, in southeastern India. It is the location of a megalithic site. It seems to have been active in trade with Arikamedu. Jewellery from Suttukeny, dated to the 2nd century BCE, is on display at the Musée Guimet in Paris.
