= Charles Chambon =

French politician

Charles Chambon was high commissioner of French India. He was born in 1896 and died in 1965. He was in office from 1949 to 1950 and was succeeded by André Ménard.

== Titles held ==
Government offices
Preceded by Charles François Marie Baron	Governor General of Pondichéry; May 1949–31 July 1950	Succeeded by André Ménard
