= Nicolas Ernest Marie Maurice Jeandin =

Nicolas Ernest Marie Maurice Jeandin (3 February 1886 – 2 August 1956) was a French colonial official who was Governor General of Pondicherry during the period immediately following the liberation of France (1944). He was born in Paris, the son of Ernest Camille Nicolas Jeandin Marie Estelle Mathiot. He died in Nice.

== Titles ==
Government offices
Preceded by Louis Alexis Étienne Bonvin	Governor of French India; 1945–1946	Succeeded by Charles François Marie Baron
