= Louis Pujol =

French naval officer and colonial administrator

Louis Pujol (16 August 1790, Paris – 26 August 1855) was Governor General for Inde française in the Second French Colonial Empire during the last years of the July Monarchy and the initial period of the French Second Republic. He was appointed a Commander of the Legion d'honneur in 1849.

== Titles Held ==
Government offices
Preceded by Paul de Nourquer du Camper	Gouverneur Général de l'Inde française 1844–1849	Succeeded by Hyacinthe Marie de Lalande de Calan
