= Raymond de Saint-Maur =

Raymond de Saint-Maur was Governor General for Inde française in the Second French Colonial Empire under the Second French Empire of Napoleon III and served from 1852 to 1857.

== Titles Held ==
Government offices
Preceded by Philippe Achille Bédier	Gouverneur Général de l'Inde française August 1852–April 1857	Succeeded by Alexandre Durand d'Ubraye
