= Napoléon Joseph Louis Bontemps =

French Indian governor

Napoléon Joseph Louis Bontemps was Governor General for Inde française in the Second French Colonial Empire during the last days of the Second Empire of France and in the initial era of the Third Republic. Before taking this post, he was governor of Guadeloupe.

== Titles held ==
Government offices
Preceded by Alexandre Durand d'Ubraye	Gouverneur Général de l'Inde française January 1863–June 1871	Succeeded by Antoine-Léonce Michaux
