= Hyacinthe Marie de Lalande de Calan =

French colonial administrator

Hyacinthe Marie de Lalande de Calan (26 April 1802 in Quimper – 14 June 1850 in Pondichéry) was Governor General for Inde française in the Second French Colonial Empire under Second Republic.

Government offices
Preceded by Louis Pujol	Gouverneur Général de l'Inde française 1849–1850	Succeeded by Philippe Achille Bédier
