= Léonce Laugier =

Gouverneur Général de l'Inde française
- In office 1879–1881

Governor of Guadeloupe
- In office 1880–1886

Personal details
- Born: 26 March 1829 Draguignan, France
- Died: 22 June 1900 (aged 71) Draguignan, France

Jean Joseph Marie Léonce Laugier was Governor General for Inde française in the Second French Colonial Empire under Third Republic.

== Biography ==
Laugier was born on 26 March 1829 in Draguignan, France, to Joseph Honoré Isidore Laugier, a lawyer, and Marguerite Françoise Gattier. In 1868, he became Secretary General of the Interior in Cochinchina. During his time in Cochinchina, he received the Royal Order of Cambodia. On 9 March 1871 he was appointed Director of Interior Services in Réunion. He then received the Legion of Honour on 7 August 1877. He became Governor of French India in February 1879, a post he held until April 1881. After retiring, Laugier died on 22 June 1900 in his hometown of Draguignan.

== Titles held ==
Government offices
Preceded by Adolph Joseph Antoine Trillard	Gouverneur Général de l'Inde française February 1879–April 1881	Succeeded by Théodore Drouhet

== External links and sources ==
- "Notice no. LH 1496/98". Base Léonore (in French).
