= Pierre Louis Alfred Duprat =

French politician (1866–1953)

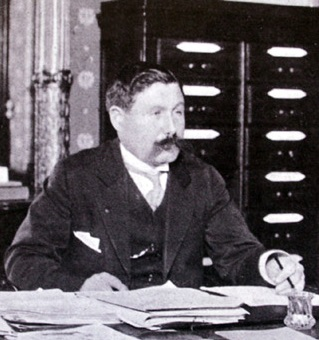
- Born: Pierre Louis Alfred Duprat; 1 December 1866; Lesparre-Médoc (France)
- Died: 15 July 1953 (aged 86); 6th arrondissement of Paris (France)
- Education: law degree in French speaking countries
- Occupation: Politician
- Awards: Commander of the Legion of Honour (1922); Chevalier of the Legion of Honour (1904); Officer of the Legion of Honor (1910); Officer of the French Order of Academic Palms
- Position held: List of governors of La Réunion (1913–1919), colonial governor of Guadeloupe (1920–1921), colonial governor of Guadeloupe (1922–1924)

Pierre Louis Alfred Duprat (December 1, 1866 – July 15, 1953) was a governor in the early 20th century French Colonial Empire.

== See also ==
- Colonial and Departmental Heads of Guadeloupe

== Titles held ==
Government offices
Preceded by Alfred Albert Martineau	Governor General of Pondichéry; July 1911–November 1913	Succeeded by Alfred Albert Martineau
Preceded by Jules Hubert Garbit	Governor General of Réunion; 23 November 1913 – 1 June 1919	Succeeded by Victor Jean Brochard
Preceded by Maurice Gourbeil	Governor General of Guadeloupe; 1920–1924	Succeeded by Louis Martial Innocent Gerbinis
