= Leroux de Touffreville =

French Governor General

L. Leroux de Touffreville was Governor General of Inde française in the Second French Colonial Empire.

Government offices
Preceded by Dominique Prosper de Chermont	Gouverneur Général de l'Inde française 1792–1793	Succeeded by Second British Occupation (23 August 1793 – 1802)
