= Antoine-Léonce Michaux =

French colonial administrator and militaryman

Head for the Protectorate over the Kingdom of Tahiti.
- In office 1876–1877

Governor General for French India
- In office June 1871 – November 1871

Personal details
- Born: November 6, 1822 Basse-Terre, Guadeloupe, France
- Died: January 20, 1893 (aged 70) France
- Military career
- Allegiance: French Third Republic
- Branch: French Navy
- Awards: Légion d'honneur

Antoine-Léonce Michaux (November 6, 1822, in Basse-Terre, Guadeloupe – January 20, 1893, France) was governor general for French India in the Second French Colonial Empire under the French Third Republic.

== Life ==
Michaux joined the French Navy in 1841, clerk in the Navy in 1845, help commissioner in 1848 and deputy commissioner in 1855. He was authorising officer in 1860, in residence at Guadeloupe, with Napoleon Bontemps. He became the assistant commissioner in 1861. He was promoted Chevalier of the légion d'honneur on December 31, 1863. He was promoted to commissioner general of the Navy in 1866. He was in 1869, in residence at New Caledonia, authorising officer, with the Rear Admiral Charles Guillain. He was elevated to Officer of the Légion d'honneur in 1872. From 1876 to 1877, he was head for the protectorate over the Kingdom of Tahiti. He was then paymaster general in Martinique around 1879. He was briefly governor general for French India in 1871 (June–November).

== Titles held ==
Government offices
Preceded by Napoléon Joseph Louis Bontemps	Gouverneur Général de l'Inde française June 1871–November 1871	Succeeded by Pierre Aristide Faron
