= Adolphe Trillard =

Adolph Joseph Antoine Trillard

Gouverneur Général de l'Inde française
- In office 1875–1878
- Preceded by: Pierre Aristide Faron
- Succeeded by: Léonce Laugier

Adolph Joseph Antoine Trillard (18 April 1826 – 12 October 1908) was Governor General for Inde française in the Second French Colonial Empire under Third Republic.

He was appointed an officer of the Legion of Honour on 30 December 1858.

Government offices
Preceded by Pierre Aristide Faron	Gouverneur Général de l'Inde française 1875–1878	Succeeded by Léonce Laugier
