= Paul de Nourquer du Camper =

Governor of French India (1776–1849)

Paul de Nourquer du Camper was Governor General for Inde française in the Second French Colonial Empire during the July Monarchy. During his period an annual statistics manual was written by Pierre Constant Sicé in 1842, which describes and narrates various situations in Inde française.

== Biography ==
Coming from the Breton nobility and great-grandnephew of Dupleix, he is said to have lived in the French trading posts in India before taking refuge in the Philippines where he was for several years, until 1808, the agent in Manila of General Decaen for the supply of food to the Île de France.

Integrated into the royal navy under the First Restoration, he was promoted to frigate captain on December 31, 1814 then ship captain the August 4, 1824.

From June 1821 to May 1823, he sailed in Asia and the Indian Ocean as second in command on the frigate La Cléopâtre, commanded by Captain Courson de la Ville-Hélio. From this expedition he produced a description of the voyage which was subject of a double publication.

Nourquer du Camper then participates from March 1824 to June 1826, to the round-the-world expedition led by Hyacinthe de Bougainville, during which he commanded the corvette L'Espérance.

At the end of his career at sea, he was appointed a member of the Naval Works Council in May 1837. Succeeding as Governor of French Guiana to the ship captain Laurens de Choisy who had just been dismissed, he exercises these powers from November 1, 1837 until November 26, 1839. On this date, he hands over his functions to Captain Gourbeyre to take up the post of Governor of the French establishments in India, which he held from April 28, 1840 until the arrival of his successor Louis Pujol, in November 16, 1844.

He was admitted to retirement by the Navy as in July 31, 1841

Captain de Nourquer du Camper was a knight of Saint-Louis. Officer of the Legion of Honor since October 29, 1826, he was elevated to the rank of commander of the same order on February 23, 1844

== Titles Held ==
Government offices
Preceded by Hubert Jean Victor, Marquis de Saint-Simon	Gouverneur Général de l'Inde française April 1840–1844	Succeeded by Louis Pujol

== See also ==
- European and American voyages of scientific exploration
