= Joseph Cordier =

French governor general

Joseph Cordier was born on 1773. He was Acting Governor General of Pondicherry twice from 1825 to 1826 and from 1828 to 1829. He entered the French Navy in 1788 as a volunteer cadet, eventing rising the ranks to become harbour captain in Pondicherry in 1814.

== Titles ==
Government offices
Preceded by André Julien, Comte Dupuy	Gouverneur Général de l'Inde française (Acting); October 1825 – 19 June 1826	Succeeded by Eugène Desbassayns de Richemont
Preceded by Eugène Desbassayns de Richemont	Gouverneur Général de l'Inde française (Acting); 14 August 1828 – 11 April 1829	Succeeded by Auguste Jacques Nicolas Peureux de Mélay
