= Auguste Jacques Nicolas Peureux de Mélay =

Auguste Jacques Nicolas Peureux de Mélay was governor-general for Inde française in the Second French Colonial Empire.

In 1818, he captained a flotilla leaving Saint Louis, Senegal for the upper Senegal river. He founded the fort of Bakel when the low water level forced them to stop 900 km upriver.

== Titles held ==
Government offices
| Preceded by Joseph Cordier | Gouverneur Général de l'Inde française 11 April 1829– 3 May 1835 | Succeeded by Hubert Jean Victor, Marquis de Saint-Simon |
