= Alexandre Durand d'Ubraye =

Alexandre Durand d'Ubraye (from Alexandre Jean-Baptiste Joseph Jacques Durand d'Ubraye) (12 September 1807 – 3 August 1864) was Governor General for Inde française in the Second French Colonial Empire under Second French Empire under Napoleon III.

== Biography ==
Son of Alexandre Jean-Baptiste Michel Durand d'Ubraye and of Marie-Pauline Riou, Alexandre Durand d'Ubraye was born in Morlaix (France).

He joined the Navy 17 December 1828 and began as Naval clerk. Firstly trainee Commissioner, then deputy Commissioner, and then Commissioner, he was Naval Commissioner General 1 June 1852.

He was appointed Governor General for Inde française in April 1857.

He died 3 August 1864 in Saint-Martin-d'Uriage (France) at the age of 56.

== Honours ==
- Commander in the French National Order of the Legion of Honour 11 August 1855.

== Titles Held ==
Government offices
Preceded by Raymond de Saint-Maur	Gouverneur Général de l'Inde française April 1857–January 1863	Succeeded by Napoléon Joseph Louis Bontemps
