= Louis Binot =

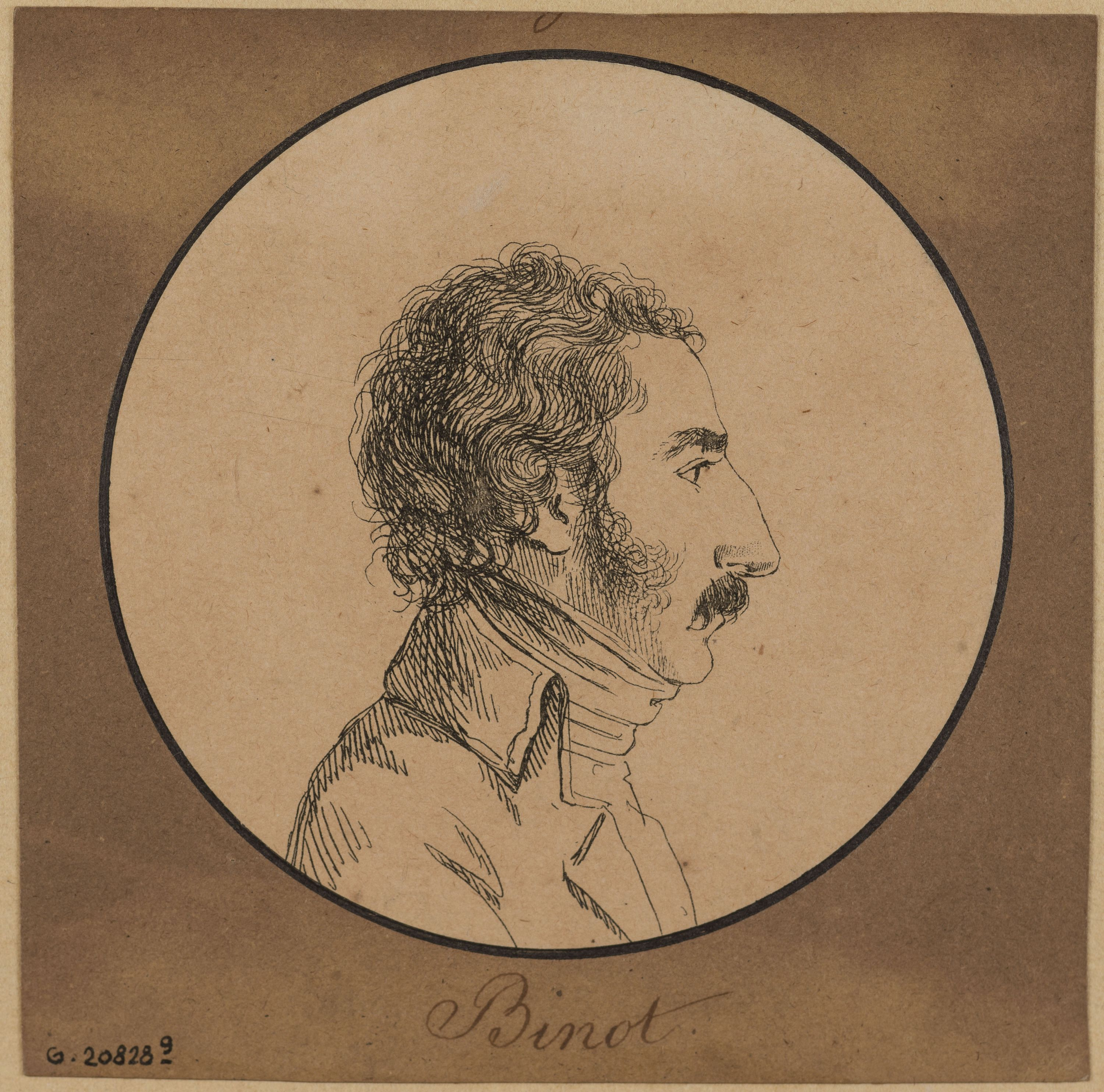
Portrait by André Dutertre, 1798–1801

Louis François Binot (English: /bɪˈnoʊ/ bin-NOH, French: [lwi bino]; 7 April 1771 – 8 February 1807) was a French Army officer and colonial administrator who served as the governor-general of French India in 1803. On 19 August 1801, Binot was appointed as chef de brigade of the French Revolutionary Army's 121st Line Infantry Regiment. Binot was awarded the Legion of Honour on 25 December 1805, and on 22 November 1806 he was promoted to brigade general. He was killed at the Battle of Eylau.

Government offices
Preceded by Charles Mathieu Isidore Decaen	Governor-General of French India; August 1803	Succeeded by British occupation
