= Eugène Desbassayns de Richemont =

Governor General of Pondicherry in India

- Born: 29 March 1800; Paris
- Died: 26 June 1859 (aged 59); Paris
- Occupation: Colonial Governor
- Known for: Inventor

Eugène Panon Desbassayns de Richemont (29 March 1800 – 26 June 1859), second Comte de Richemont, was a French colonial administrator and inventor.

== Life ==
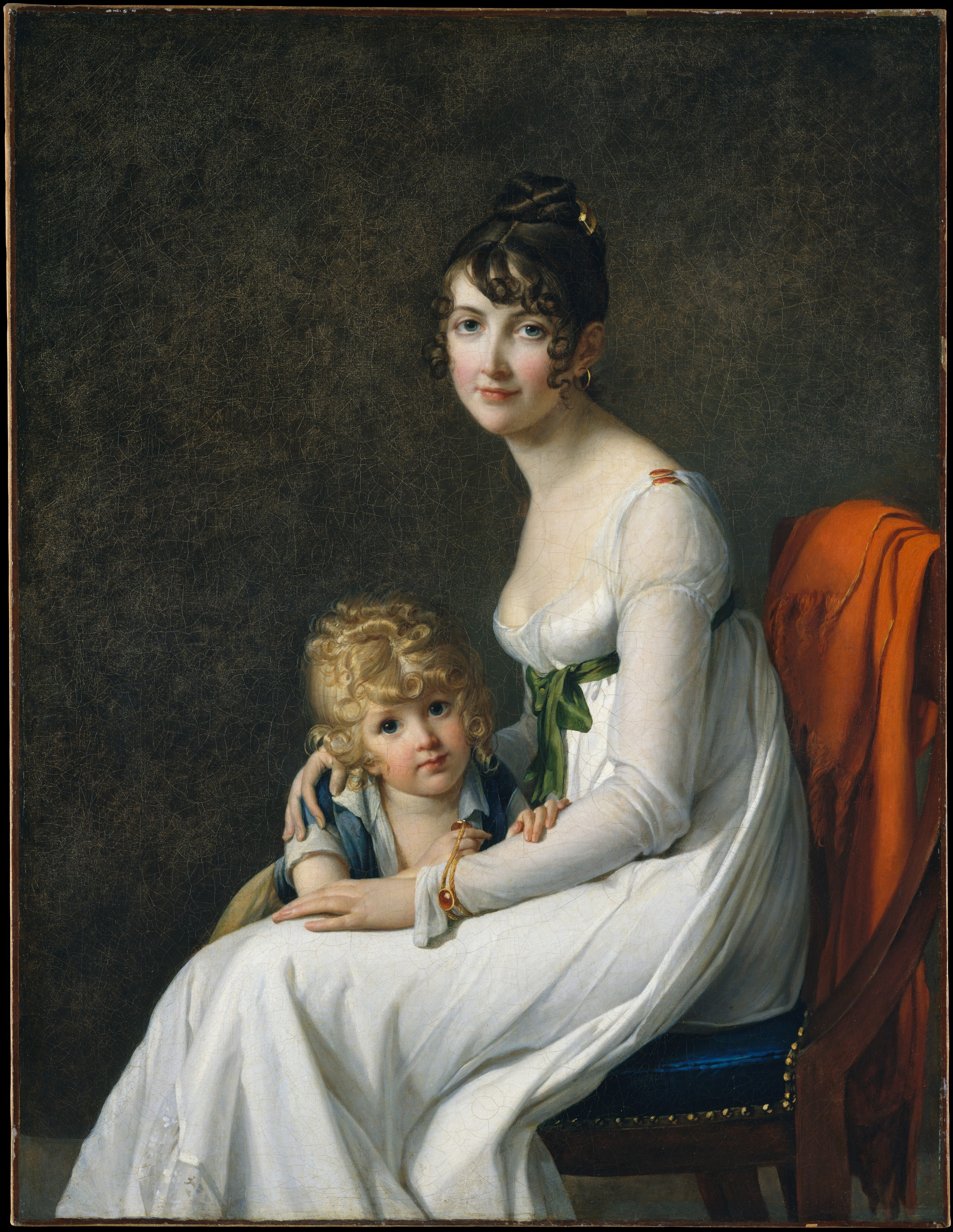
Marie-Guillemine Benoist, Eglé Desbassayns de Richemont, née Mourgue, with her son Eugène, 1802 (Metropolitan Museum of Art)

Eugène Panon Desbassayns de Richemont was born on 29 March 1800 in Paris. His father was Philippe Panon-Desbassayns de Richemont, Comte Desbassayns de Richemont, and his mother was Jeanne-Eglée Fulcrande Mourgue. He married Athénaïs-Claire-Joséphine-Grace on June 10, 1829 in Paris. Their children were Jeanne Mathilde (1830-1832), Alexandre Pierre Philippe, third count of Richemont (1833-1912), Edgard Philippe (1835-1914), Naïs Jeanne Modeste Eugénie (1839-1878) and Jeanne Joséphine Grâce Céline Marie (1846-1913).

Eugène Desbassayns de Richemont was Governor General of Pondicherry in India between 1826 and 1828. He was the founder of the Lycée français de Pondichéry (Collège Royal) on 26 October 1826. In 1839, he donated 15,386 francs for the foundation of a leper colony near Coconut Island. The hospital was completed in 1844, and still exists. He was the inventor of a method of welding with lead, and of a type of fertilizer.

Desbassayns de Richemont died on 26 June 1859 in Paris.

== Titles ==
Government offices
Preceded by Joseph Cordier, Marie Emmanuel (Acting)	Gouverneur Général de l'Inde française June 19, 1826– August 2, 1828	Succeeded by Joseph Cordier, Marie Emmanuel (Acting)

== Sources ==
- Neuville, Emmanuel, "Eugène Panon Desbassayns de Richemont", geneanet (in French)
