= Théodore Drouhet =

Théodore Drouhet (4 April 1817 – 18 October 1904) was Governor General for Inde française in the Second French Colonial Empire under Third Republic.

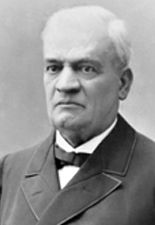
Théodore Drouhet portrait

Government offices
Preceded by Léonce Laugier	Gouverneur Général de l'Inde française 1881 – October 1884	Succeeded by Étienne Richaud
