= Henri Jean de Rouvroy, Marquis of Saint-Simon =

French diplomat and colonial administrator

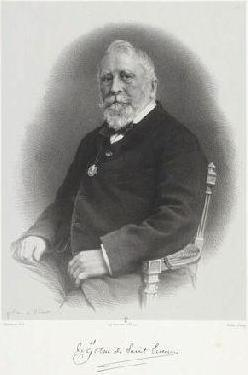

Henri Jean Victor de Rouvroy, Marquis of Saint-Simon (11 February 1782 – 18 March 1865) was a French diplomat and colonial administrator.

== Biography ==
As a young man, he fought in the French Revolutionary and Napoleonic Wars In Germany and in Spain.
On the return of Louis XVIII, Viscount Saint-Simon joined the Bourbons. He served, in his rank of colonel, as second lieutenant of the King's bodyguards, a cavalry unit that had just been reestablished. He was awarded the Knight's Cross of the Royal and Military Order of Saint-Louis on 5 July 1814, and the ribbon of officer of the Legion of Honour on 24 August.

He was Ambassador of France in Denmark between 1820 and 1832, and in Sweden between 1832 and 1833. He served as Governor General for Inde française in the Second French Colonial Empire during the July Monarchy between 1835 and 1840.

From 1842, he called himself "Duke of Saint-Simon". Indeed, he was the nephew of Claude-Anne de Rouvroy, Marquis of Saint-Simon, created Grandee of Spain of the first class by King Charles IV in 1803 and raised to the dignity of Duke of Saint-Simon by King Ferdinand VII in 1814. Claude-Anne died in Madrid on 3 January 1819, leaving only an unmarried daughter. Claude-Anne bequeathed his Grandee of Spain to his nephew, and probably also his Spanish Ducal title, which was however not recognised in France.

=== Publication of the Memoirs of the Duke de Saint Simon (1675-1755) ===
In 1828, Henri Jean de Rouvroy brought together the 11 portfolios containing the 2,854 pages of the Memoirs of his distant relative the Duke of Saint-Simon (1675–1755). He published the work in 1829 and 1830 through publisher Auguste Sautelet, in 27 volumes, under the title Mémoires complets et authentiques du duc de Saint-Simon sur le siècle de Louis XIV et la Régence : publies pour la première fois sur le manuscrit originale écrit toute la main de l'auteur par le M[arqu]is de Saint-Simon.

Government offices
Preceded by Auguste Jacques Nicolas Peureux de Mélay	Gouverneur Général de l'Inde française 3 May 1835–April 1840	Succeeded by Paul de Nourquer du Camper
