= François de Souillac =

French naval officer

Governor General of Réunion
- In office 26 October 1776 – 30 April 1779

Governor General of Mascarene Islands
- In office 14 February 1782 – 3 July 1785

Gouverneur Général de l'Inde française
- In office 1785

Personal details
- Born: 2 July 1732 Périgord, France
- Died: 1803 (aged 70–71)

Military service
- Branch/service: French Navy
- Rank: Chef d'escadre

François de Peynier, vicomte de Souillac was born on 2 July 1732 in Périgord. He was Governor of Isle Bourbon (now Réunion), Governor General of the Mascarene Islands and Pondichéry.

== Biography ==
Souillac joined the Navy as a Garde-Marine on 24 September 1744. He was promoted to Ensign in 1749, Lieutenant in 1757, and to Captain in 1772.

From 1775, he was military commander of Isle Bourbon (now La Réunion). On 15 October 1776, Souillac wrote an ordinance founding the "Quartier du Repos de Laleu". On 8 March 1777, he issue another decree attempting to make hunting for the runaway slaves more humane.

Souillac served in the War of American Independence under Suffren.

On 1 May 1779 he became Governor General by interim of the islands of Mauritius and Bourbon. On 30 January 1780 he was confirmed in that position.

Souillac was promoted to Chef d'escadre in 1784.

He left the Indian Ocean in 1787 and died in 1803.

== Legacy ==
Today a village of Mauritius is named after him. There is a street named after him in Pondicherry. A small beach in the Port Glaud district of Mahé, Seychelles is named "Anse Souillac" after him.

== Titles ==
Government offices
Preceded by Jean-Guillaume Steinauer	Governor General of Réunion; 26 October 1776–30 April 1779	Succeeded by Joseph Murinay de Saint-Maurice
Preceded by Charles Joseph Pâtissier, Marquis de Bussy-Castelnau	Gouverneur Général de l'Inde française 1785	Succeeded by David Charpentier de Cossigny
Preceded by Joseph Murinais, Comte de, Saint-Maurice (Acting)	Governor General of Mascarene Islands; 14 February 1782 – 3 July 1785	Succeeded by Camille Charles Leclerc, Chevalier de Fresne (Acting)

== Notes, citations, and references ==
Notes

Citations

References

- Martin-Allanic, Jean-Étienne (1964). Bougainville Navigateur et les Découvertes de son Temps (in French). Paris: Presses Universitaires de France. OCLC 729759706.
