= Philippe Achille Bédier =

Philippe Achille Bédier (c. 1791 - 1865) was Governor General for Inde française during the transition of Second Republic and Second French Colonial Empire under Second French Empire under Napoleon III.

== Titles Held ==
Government offices
Preceded by Hyacinthe Marie de Lalande de Calan	Gouverneur Général de l'Inde française 1851–1852	Succeeded by Raymond de Saint-Maur
