= Charles François Marie Baron =

Charles François Marie Baron was Governor (later High Commissioner) of French India from March 1946 to May 1949.

== Titles ==
Government offices
Preceded by Louis Alexis Étienne Bonvin	Governor of French India; 20 March 1946–20 August 1947	Succeeded by Incumbent (As High Commissioner)
Preceded by Incumbent (As Governor)	High Commissioner of French India; 20 August 1947–May 1949	Succeeded by Charles Chambon
