= Pierre Aristide Faron =

Pierre Aristide Faron was Governor General for Inde française in the Second French Colonial Empire under the Third Republic from 1871 to 1875.

== Titles Held ==
Government offices
| Preceded by Antoine-Léonce Michaux | Gouverneur Général de l'Inde française November 1871–1875 | Succeeded by Adolph Joseph Antoine Trillard |
