= André Julien, Comte Dupuy =

André Julien, Comte Dupuy (13 June 1753, Brioude – 6 January 1832, Paris), was Governor General of French India between 1816 and 1825.

== Life ==
He was Governor General of Pondicherry between September 1816 to October 1825. After Treaty of Paris (1814), Pondicherry and its territories were returned to French by British for the third and last time. Then Comte Dupuy was made Governor General of it. Today there is a street named upon him (Rue Comte Dupuy) in Pondicherry.

Government offices
| Preceded by Third British occupation (August 1803 – September 1816) | Gouverneur Général de l'Inde française 26 September 1816–October 1825 | Succeeded by Joseph Cordier, Marie Emmanuel (Acting) |
