= Louis Pelletan =

French diplomat

Louis Pelletan was Governor General of Pondicherry in 1902, during the Second French Colonial Empire under Third Republic.

Government offices
| Preceded by François Pierre Rodier | Gouverneur Général de l'Inde française (Acting); 11 January 1902–1902 | Succeeded by Victor Louis Marie Lanrezac |
