= Louis Bonvin =

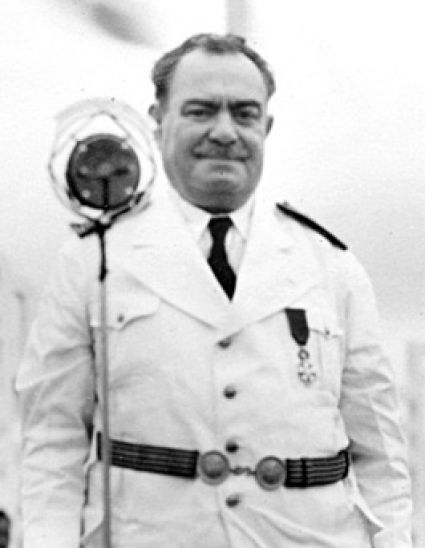
- Louis Bonvin, c. 1940
- Born: 6 November 1886; Montluçon, Allier, France
- Died: 23 February 1946 (aged 59); Montluçon, Allier
- Education: HEC Paris
- Occupation: Colonial Admintrator
- Years active: 1912–1945
- Awards: Knight Commander of the Order of the British Empire

Louis Alexis Étienne Bonvin (6 November 1886 in Montluçon (Allier) – 23 February 1946, Montluçon (Allier)) was a French diplomat and colonial official of the French Third Republic, who served as governor of French India between 1938 and 1946.

== Early life ==
Louis Bonvin was born on 6 November 1886 in Montluçon (Allier) to a family of shopkeepers. He studied in Paris where he graduated from Hautes études commerciales (HEC), and in 1912, joined the colonial administration in French Equatorial Africa. Promoted to deputy director of the colonies in 1914, he served successively in Chad, Middle Congo, and then Gabon. In 1933 he was appointed Inspector of Administrative Affairs in Gabon, and then became acting Governor in 1934. He was appointed Governor in 1936, serving till December 1937.

== French India ==
In 1938, The French government appointed him governor of French India, a colony shaken by unrest in the textile mills. In the course of the French military debacle during World War II, Bonvin telegraphed to the French government (then in Bordeaux) on 20 June 1940, declaring the will of the people of French India to continue the war on the side of the Allies. However, following the signing of the Armistice of 22 June 1940, he immediately recognized the government of Marshal Pétain. Shortly afterward, after meeting with Colonel Schomberg, the British consul in Pondicherry, who warned him that the British Indian Army would occupy the colony if he didn't declare for General de Gaulle, he reversed his decision. In an appeal to the people of 27 June 1940, Bonvin announced that the French colonial empire (and therefore the French Establishments in India) "will remain on the British side until the final victory." On 12 July, Governor Bonvin, through the British, assured de Gaulle of the cooperation of French India.

On 9 September 1940, two days after having informed the authorities and officers of the colony of his decision, Louis Bonvin proclaimed the formal adherence of French India to Free France. General de Gaulle immediately confirmed Bonvin's position as Governor.

The Vichy French denounced Bonvin for this action. On 14 January 1942, the Vichyite Permanent Military Tribunal of Saigon in French Indochina found him guilty of "delivery to a foreign power of territory belonging to France", and sentenced him to death. His wife, Marcelle Bonvin, was sentenced to penal servitude for life. As Bonvin was not in Indochina, this had no real effect.

For the duration of hostilities, Bonvin was at the forefront as a representative of General de Gaulle for India and the East from 1940 to 1944.

He was a member of the Defense Council of the Empire and worked to provide all possible assistance to the Free French forces (Forces Françaises Libres, FFL) including those under the command of General Kœnig in North Africa. This aid was funnelled through the Red Cross committee headed by Bonvin's wife; some of it came from soldiers of the FFL in the form of subscriptions and also remittances.

Before he left India in September 1945, the British government, for services rendered to the Allied cause, awarded him the dignity of Knight Commander of the Order of the British Empire.

Louis Bonvin died on 23 February 1946, as a result of an illness contracted in India, three months after his return to Montluçon, his hometown, where he is buried.

== Titles Held ==
Government offices
Preceded by Étienne Charles Deschanel	Governor of Gabon; 24 October 1936–11 September 1937	Succeeded by Georges Hubert Parisot
Preceded by Horace Valentin Crocicchia	Governor of French India; 26 September 1938–1945	Succeeded by Nicolas Ernest Marie Maurice Jeandin

== See also ==
- Colonial heads of Gabon
