= Alfred Albert Martineau =

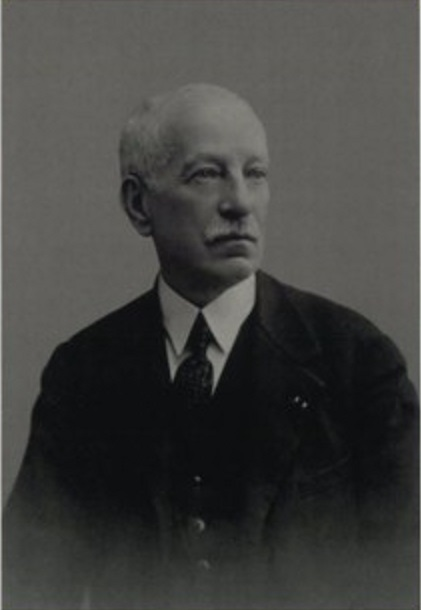
Alfred Martineau

Alfred Albert Martineau (18 December 1859 in Artins – 25 January 1945 in Varennes) was a notable historian and colonial administrator in the French Colonial Empire.

He wrote extensively on colonial affairs and the history of French colonial expansion, in particular a six-volume Histoire des colonies françaises et de l'expansion française dans le monde (1930–1934) co-authored with former French Foreign Minister Gabriel Hanotaux. Upon retirement from colonial service in 1921 he taught colonial history at the Collège de France until 1935.

He was a founding member of the Société de l'histoire de l'Inde française, the Societe francaise d'Histoire d'Outre-Mer (1912) and the Académie des sciences coloniales (1922).

== Early life ==
Martineau was born on 18 December 1859 in Artins, which was then part of the Second French Empire. He graduated from the École Nationale des Chartes, where he trained as an archivist-paleographer.

== Political career ==
In 1888 he joined the executive committee of the far-right nationalist Ligue des Patriotes. He was soon elected as a Member of Parliament of the French Parliament for Paris's 19th arrondissement in October 1889. In January 1890, he left the league, which resulted in him being booed and beaten by his constituents, to which he promised to resign. However, he joined the Republican majority government soon after. In 1893 he was elected to the Superior Council of the Colonies as a delegate of Nossi Bé, where he advocated to the council for the establishment of a French protectorate over Madagascar.

== Titles ==
Government offices
Preceded by Henri Noufflard (Acting)	Governor of French Somaliland; 28 March 1899–13 April 1900	Succeeded by Gabriel Angoulvant (Acting)
Preceded by Pierre Pascal	Administrator of Mayotte; 15 October 1902–1 June 1904	Succeeded by Jules Martin (Acting)
Preceded by Léonce Lagarde	Governor of Gabon; 26 April 1907–20 January 1909	Succeeded by Édouard Telle (Acting)
Preceded by Ernest Lévecque	Governor of French India (1st term); 9 July 1910–July 1911	Succeeded by Pierre Duprat
Preceded by Pierre Duprat	Governor of French India (2nd term); November 1913–29 June 1918	Succeeded by Louis Gerbinis

== See also ==
- Colonial heads of Djibouti (French Somaliland)
- List of colonial governors in 1899
- List of colonial governors in 1900
- Colonial heads of the Comoros
- Colonial heads of Gabon
