= André Ménard =

French colonial governor

André Ménard (14 February 1907 in Blois, France – 4 November 1988 in Paris, France) was a Governor General in the French colonial empire in the 20th century.

== Significant events ==
During his reign, the coup d'État de Yanaon happened on 13 June 1954. In the aftermath, he recalled the Administrator of Yanam (Administrateur de Yanaon), George Sala, to Pondicherry.

== Titles ==
Government offices
Preceded by Robert Charles Henri Kuter	Governor of New Hebrides; 1947–1949	Succeeded by Pierre Amédée Joseph Émile Jean
Preceded by Charles Chambon	Governor General of Pondichéry; 31 July 1950 – October 1954	Succeeded by Georges Escargueil
