= Dominique Prosper de Chermont =

French colonial administrator (1741–1798)

Dominique Prosper de Chermont (24 November 1741 – 13 September 1798) was a French colonial administrator who served as the governor of French India from 1792 to 1793.

Government offices
Preceded by Camille Charles Leclerc, Chevalier de Fresne	Governor of French India; 1792–1793	Succeeded by Leroux de Touffreville
Preceded by David Charpentier de Cossigny	Governor of Isle Bourbon; 8 September 1790–18 October 1792	Succeeded by Jean-Baptiste Vigoureux Duplessis
