= Camille Charles Leclerc, Chevalier de Fresne =

Mauritian-French politician (1741–1797)

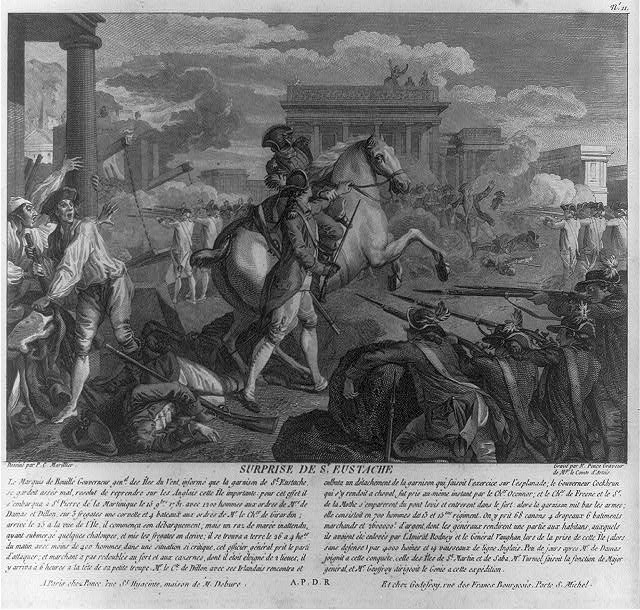
Recapture of Sint Eustatius, 1781

Camille Charles Le Clerc de Fresne, known as Chevalier de Fresne (26 February 1741 in Lyon–1797) was Governor General of Mauritius (1785) and Puducherry from 1789 to 1792 in the French Colonial Empire.

He married a widow, Emilie-Thomase de Solminihac (1770–1846), in Puducherry, on 20 June 1788. One significant event occurred in his tenure was Mr. Pierre Sonnerat, Chief of Yanam, was involved in the business along with other traders. Pierre Sonnerat's commercial involvement brought serious consequences to his administrative post (Chief of Yanam). The petitions were made against Pierre Sonnerat in this connection, to Chevalier de Fresne, the then French Governor General in Puducherry. On 5 June 1790 a French man "De Mars" complained against Pierre Sonnerat for the first time.

Government offices
Preceded by François, Vicomte de Souillac	Governor General of Mauritius (Acting for Souillac); 5 Apr 1785–28 Jun 1785	Succeeded by Chevalier de Fleury, (Acting for Souillac)
Preceded by Thomas Conway	Governor of French India; 1789–1792	Succeeded by Dominique Prosper de Chermont
