= Victor Louis Marie Lanrezac =

Victor Louis Marie Lanrezac (24 March 1854 in Brest – 1 January 1916 in Neuilly-sur-Seine) was Governor General of Pondicherry in Second French Colonial Empire under Third Republic. He was made Chevalier of the Legion of Honour in 1899.

Government offices
Preceded by Pelletan	Governor General of Pondichéry; 1902–1904	Succeeded by Philema Lemaire
