= List of office-holders in India =

Heads of government of Indian states

The List of office-holders in India is a list of heads of government of states which exercised control over India, including colonial governments, from the time of the Sultanate of Delhi through to today.

== List of rulers of Sultans of Delhi ==
Sultan of Delhi
- State
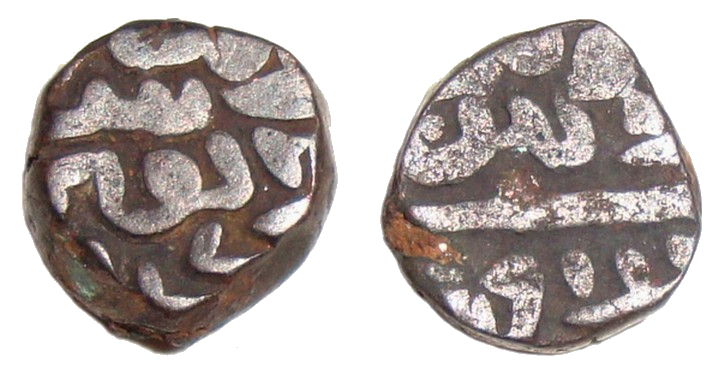
- Coin of last Sultan

Details
- Style: Sultan, Sultan of Sultans, Shah
- First monarch: Qutb ud-Din Aibak
- Last monarch: Ibrahim Lodi
- Formed: 1206
- Abolished: 1526
- Residences: Lahore (1206–1210); Badayun (1210–1214); Delhi (1214–1327); Daulatabad (1327–1334); Delhi (1334–1506); Agra (1506–1526)
- Appointer: Hereditary

Sultans of Delhi were the rulers of the Muslim empire based in Delhi that stretched over large parts of the subcontinent during the period of Medieval India, for 320 years (1206–1526). Following the conquest of South Asia by the Ghurids, five unrelated heterogeneous dynasties ruled over the Delhi Sultanate sequentially: the Mamluk dynasty (1206–1290), the Khalji dynasty (1290–1320), the Tughlaq dynasty (1320–1414), the Sayyid dynasty (1414–1451), and the Lodi dynasty (1451–1526). It covered large swaths of territory in modern-day India, Pakistan, and Bangladesh.

This list contains the rulers of Delhi Sultanate in chronological order.

=== Mamluk dynasty (1206–1290) ===
S/N	Name of ruler	Birth Date	Death Date	Beginning of reign	End of reign	Notes
1	Qutbuddin Aibak	1150	14 November 1210	25 June 1206	14 November 1210	
2	Aram Shah	unknown	June 1211	December 1210	June 1211	Son of Aibak
3	Iltutmish	unknown	30 April 1236	June 1211	30 April 1236	Son-in-law of Aibak
4	Ruknuddin Firuz (Firuz I)	unknown	19 November 1236	April/May 1236	November 1236	Son of Iltutmish
5	Razia Sultan	unknown	15 October 1240	November 1236	20 April 1240	Daughter of Iltutmish
6	Muiz ud din Bahram	9 July 1212	15 May 1242	May 1240	15 May 1242	Son of Iltutmish
7	Ala-ud-Din Masud Shah	unknown	10 June 1246	May 1242	10 June 1246	Son of Ruknuddin Firuz
8	Nasiruddin Mahmud Shah (Mahmud I)	1229 or 1230	18 February 1266	10 June 1246	18 February 1266	Grandson of Iltutmish
9	Ghiyas ud din Balban	1216	1287	February 1266	1287	Turkish noble in the court of Iltutmish
10	Muiz ud din Qaiqabad	1269	1 February 1290	1287	1 February 1290	Grandson of Balban
11	Shamsuddin Kayumars	1285/1287	13 June 1290	1 February 1290	13 June 1290	Son of Qaiqabad

=== Khalji/Khilji dynasty (1290–1320) ===
S/N	Name	Birth date	Death date	Beginning of reign	End of reign	Notes
12	Jalal-ud-din Khalji (Firuz II)	1220	19 July 1296	13 June 1290	19 July 1296	
–	Ruknuddin Ibrahim	unknown	after 1296	July 1296	November 1296	Son of Jalal-ud-din Khalji. He ruled for a short time, not always indicating his names on the lists.
13	Alauddin Khalji	c. 1266	4 January 1316	November 1296	4 January 1316	Nephew of Jalal-ud-din Khalji
14	Shihabuddin Omar	1310 or 1311	April 1316	5 January 1316	April 1316	Son of Alauddin Khalji
15	Qutbuddin Mubarak Shah	1299	9 July 1320	14 April 1316	1 May 1320	Son of Alauddin Khalji

=== Outside of the dynasties (1320) ===
S/N	Name	Birth date	Death date	Beginning of reign	End of reign	Notes
16	Khusrau Khan	unknown	1320	10 July 1320	5 September 1320	He ruled for a short time, not founding a dynasty.

=== Tughluq dynasty (1320–1414) ===
S/N	Name	Birth date	Death date	Beginning of reign	End of reign	Notes
17	Ghiyath al-Din Tughluq (Tughluq I)	unknown	1 February 1325	8 September 1320	1 February 1325	
18	Muhammad bin Tughluq (Muhammad II)	c. 1290	20 March 1351	1 February 1325	20 March 1351	Son of Ghiyath al-Din Tughluq
19	Firuz Shah Tughlaq (Firuz III)	1309	20 September 1388	23 March 1351	20 September 1388	Son-in-law of Ghiyath al-Din Tughluq
20	Tughluq Khan (Tughluq II)	unknown	14 March 1389	20 September 1388	14 March 1389	Grandson of Firuz Shah Tughlaq
21	Abu Bakr Shah	unknown	after 1390	15 March 1389	August 1390	Grandson of Firuz Shah Tughlaq
22	Nasir ud din Muhammad Shah III (Muhammad III)	unknown	20 January 1394	31 August 1390	20 January 1394	Son of Firuz Shah Tughlaq
23	Ala ud-din Sikandar Shah	unknown	8 March 1394	22 January 1394	8 March 1394	Son of Nasir ud din Muhammad Shah III
24	Nasir-ud-din Mahmud Shah Tughluq	unknown	February 1413	March 1394	February 1413	Son of Nasir ud din Muhammad Shah III
–	Nasir-ud-din Nusrat Shah Tughluq	unknown	1398 or 1399	January 1395	1398 or 1399	Brother of Tughluq Khan. Mahmud Shah's anti-king, claimant to the throne, sub-ruler.

=== Sayyid dynasty (1414–1451) ===
S/N	Name	Birth date	Death date	Beginning of reign	End of reign	Notes
25	Khizr Khan	unknown	20 May 1421	28 May 1414	20 May 1421	
26	Mubarak Shah	unknown	19 February 1434	21 May 1421	19 February 1434	Son of Khizr Khan
27	Muhammad Shah (Muhammad IV)	unknown	January 1445	February 1434	January 1445	Grandson of Khizr Khan
28	Alam Shah	unknown	July 1478	January 1445	19 April 1451	Son of Muhammad Shah

=== Lodi dynasty (1451–1526) ===
S/N	Name	Birth date	Death date	Beginning of reign	End of reign	Notes
29	Bahlul Lodi	1420	12 July 1489	19 April 1451	12 July 1489	
30	Sikandar Lodi (Sikandar II)	17 July 1458	21 November 1517	17 July 1489	21 November 1517	Son of Bahlul Lodi
31	Ibrahim Lodi	1480	21 April 1526	November 1517	21 April 1526	Son of Sikandar Lodi

=== Mamluk dynasty (1206-1290) ===
Mamluk dynasty

Qutb ud-Din; Aibak^{(1)} r. 1206-1210
Aram Shah^{(2)} r. 1210-1211
Shams ud-Din; Iltutmish^{(3)} r. 1211-1236
Rukn ud-Din; Firuz^{(4)} r. 1236	Razia; Sultana^{(5)} r. 1236-1240	Muiz ud-Din; Bahram^{(6)} r. 1240-1242	Nasir ud-Din; Mahmud^{(8)} r. 1246-1266
Ala ud-Din; Masud^{(7)} r. 1242-1246	Ghiyath ud-Din; Balban^{(9)} r. 1266-1286
Nasir ud-Din; Bughra Khan
Muiz ud-Din; Qaiqabad^{(10)} r. 1287-1290
Shams ud-Din; Kayumars^{(11)} r. 1290

=== Khalji/Khilji dynasty (1290-1320) ===
Khalji dynasty

Yughrush
Jalal ud-Din; Khalji^{(12)} r. 1290-1296	Shihab ud-Din; Mas'ud
Ala ud-Din; Khalji^{(13)} r. 1296-1316
Shihab ud-Din; Omar^{(14)} r. 1316	Qutb ud-Din; Mubarak^{(15)} r. 1316-1320	Khusrau; Khan^{(16)} r. 1320

=== Tughluq dynasty (1320-1413) ===
Tughluq dynasty

Ghiyath al-Din; Tughluq I^{(17)} r. 1320-1325	Malik Rajab
Muhammad bin Tughluq^{(18)} r. 1325-1351	Firuz Shah; Tughlaq^{(19)} r. 1351-1388
Fateh Khan	Zafar Khan	Nasir ud-Din; Muhammad^{(22)} r. 1390-1394
Ghiyath ud-Din; Tughluq II^{(20)} r. 1388-1389	Abu Bakr; Shah^{(21)} r. 1389-1390	Ala ud-Din; Sikandar^{(23)} r. 1394	Nasir ud-Din; Mahmud^{(24)} r. 1394-1413

=== Sayyid dynasty (1414-1451) ===
Sayyid dynasty

Khizr Khan^{(25)} r. 1414-1421
Mubarak; Shah^{(26)} r. 1421-1434	Farid Khan
Muhammad; Shah^{(27)} r. 1434-1445
Ala ud-Din; Alam Shah^{(28)} r. 1445-1451

=== Lodi dynasty (1451-1526) ===
Lodi dynasty

Bahlul; Khan Lodi^{(29)} r. 1451-1489
Sikandar; Khan Lodi^{(30)} r. 1489-1517
Ibrahim; Khan Lodi^{(31)} r. 1517-1526

== List of Mughal Emperors ==
Here are the claimants to the Mughal throne historians recognise as titular Mughal emperors.

1. Shahryar Mirza (1627 - 1628)
2. Dawar Baksh (1627 - 1628)
3. Jahangir II (1719 - 1720)

Portrait	Titular Name	Birth Name	Birth	Reign	Death
1	Babur بابر	Zahir Ud-Din Muhammad Ghazi ظہیر الدین محمد	14 February 1483 Andijan, Uzbekistan	20 April 1526 – 26 December 1530	26 December 1530 (aged 47) Agra, India
2	Humayun ہمایوں	Nasir Ud-Din Baig Muhammad Khan ناصر الدین بیگ محمد خان	6 March 1508 Kabul, Afghanistan	26 December 1530 – 17 May 1540 22 February 1555 – 27 January 1556	27 January 1556 (aged 47) Delhi, India
3	Akbar اکبر	Abu'l Fath Jalal Ud-Din Muhammad ابوالفتح جلال الدین محمد	15 October 1542 Umerkot, Pakistan	11 February 1556 – 27 October 1605	27 October 1605 (aged 63) Agra, India
4	Jahangir جہانگیر	Nur Ud-Din Baig Muhammad khan Salim نورالدین بیگ محمد خان سلیم	31 August 1569 Agra, India	3 November 1605 – 28 October 1627	28 October 1627 (aged 58) Jammu and Kashmir, India
5	Shah Jahan شاہ جہان	Shahab Ud-Din Muhammad Khurram شہاب الدین محمد خرم	5 January 1592 Lahore, Pakistan	19 January 1628 – 31 July 1658	22 January 1666 (aged 74) Agra, India
6	Aurangzeb اورنگزیب Alamgir عالمگیر	Muhi Ud-Din Muhammad محی الدین محمد	3 November 1618 Gujarat, India	31 July 1658 – 3 March 1707	3 March 1707 (aged 88) Ahmednagar, India
7	Azam Shah اعظم شاہ	Qutb Ud-Din Muhammad قطب الدين محمد	28 June 1653 Burhanpur, India	14 March 1707 – 20 June 1707	20 June 1707 (aged 53) Agra, India
8	Bahadur Shah بہادر شاہ Shah Alam شاہ عالم	Abul-Nasr Sayyid Qutb-ud-din Mirza Muhammad Muazzam ابوالنصر سید قطب الدین مرزا محمد معظم	14 October 1643 Burhanpur, India	19 June 1707 – 27 February 1712	27 February 1712 (aged 68) Lahore, Pakistan
9	Jahandar Shah جہاندار شاہ	Mu'izz-ud-Din Beg Muhammad Khan Bahādur معیز الدین بیگ محمد خان بہادر	9 May 1661 Deccan, India	27 February 1712 – 11 February 1713	12 February 1713 (aged 51) Delhi, India
10	Farrukhsiyar فرخ سیر	Abu'l Muzaffar Muīn-ud-Dīn Muhammad Shāh Farrukhsiyar Alim Akbar Sāni Wālā Shān Pādshāh-i-bahr-u-bar ابوالمظفر معین الدین محمد شاہ فرخ سیار علیم اکبر ثانی والا شان پادشاہ البحر البر; Puppet King Under the Sayyids of Barha	20 August 1685 Aurangabad, India	11 January 1713 – 28 February 1719	19 April 1719 (aged 33) Delhi, India
11	Rafi ud-Darajat رفیع الدرجات	Abu'l Barakat Shams-ud-Din Muhammad Rafi ud-Darajat Padshah Ghazi Shahanshah-i-Bahr-u-Bar ابوالبرکات شمس الدین محمد رفیع الدراجات پادشاہ غازی شہنشاہ البحر البر; Puppet King Under the Sayyids of Barha	1 December 1699	28 February 1719 – 6 June 1719	6 June 1719 (aged 19) Agra, India
12	Shah Jahan II شاہ جہان دوم	Rafi-ud-Din Muhammad Rafi-ud-Daulah رفیع الدین محمد رفیع الدولہ; Puppet King Under the Sayyids of Barha	5 January 1696	6 June 1719 – 17 September 1719	18 September 1719 (aged 23) Agra, India
13	Muhammad Shah محمد شاہ	Nasir-ud-Din Muḥammad Shah Roshan Akhtar Bahadur Ghazi ناصر الدین محمد شاہ روشن اختر بہادر غازی; Puppet King Under the Sayyids of Barha	7 August 1702 Ghazni, Afghanistan	27 September 1719 – 26 April 1748	26 April 1748 (aged 45) Delhi, India
14	Ahmad Shah Bahadur احمد شاہ بہادر	Abu-Nasir Mujahid ud-din Muhammad Ahmad Shah Bahadur Ghazi ابو ناصر مجاہد الدین محمد احمد شاہ بہادر غازی	23 December 1725 Delhi, India	29 April 1748 – 2 June 1754	1 January 1775 (aged 49) Delhi, India
15	Alamgir II عالمگیر دوم	Aziz Ud-Din Muhammad عزیز اُلدین محمد	6 June 1699 Burhanpur, India	3 June 1754 – 29 November 1759	29 November 1759 (aged 60) Kotla Fateh Shah, India
16	Shah Jahan III شاہ جہان سوم	Muhi Ul-Millat محی اُلملت	1711	10 December 1759 – 10 October 1760	1772 (aged 60–61)
17	Shah Alam II شاہ عالم دوم	Abdu'llah Jalal ud-din Abu'l Muzaffar Ham ud-din Muhammad 'Mirza Ali Gauhar عبدالله جلال الدین ابوالمظفر هم الدین محمد میرزا علی گوهر شاه علم دوم	25 June 1728 Delhi, India	10 October 1760 – 31 July 1788	19 November 1806 (aged 78) Delhi, India
18	Shah Jahan IV جہان شاه چہارم	Bidar Bakht Mahmud Shah Bahadur Jahan Shah بیدار بخت محمود شاه بهادر جہان شاہ	1749 Delhi, India	31 July 1788 – 11 October 1788	1790 (aged 40–41) Delhi, India
19	Shah Alam II شاہ عالم دوم	Abdu'llah Jalal ud-din Abu'l Muzaffar Ham ud-din Muhammad 'Mirza Ali Gauhar عبدالله جلال الدین ابوالمظفر هم الدین محمد میرزا علی گوهر شاه علم دوم; Puppet King under the Maratha Empire	25 June 1728 Delhi, India	16 October 1788 – 19 November 1806	19 November 1806 (aged 78) Delhi, India
20	Akbar Shah II اکبر شاہ دوم	Sultan Ibn Sultan Sahib al-Mufazi Wali Ni'mat Haqiqi Khudavand Mujazi Abu Nasir Mu'in al-Din Muhammad Akbar Shah Pad-Shah Ghazi سلطان ابن سلطان صاحب المفاضی ولی نعمت حقی خداوند مجازی ابو ناصر معین الدین محمد اکبر شاہ پاد شاہ غازی; Puppet King under the East India Company	22 April 1760 Mukundpur, India	19 November 1806 – 28 September 1837	28 September 1837 (aged 77) Delhi, India
21	Bahadur Shah II Zafar بہادر شاہ ظفر	Abu Zafar Siraj Ud-Din Muhammad ابو ظفر سراج اُلدین محمد	24 October 1775 Delhi, India	28 September 1837 – 21 September 1857	7 November 1862 (aged 87) Rangoon, Myanmar

== List of title-holders Emperor of India ==
Portrait	Name	Birth	Reign	Death	Consort	Imperial Durbar	Royal House
	Victoria	24 May 1819	1 May 1876 – 22 January 1901	22 January 1901	None (Note: Victoria's husband Prince Albert died on 14 December 1861.)	1 January 1877 (represented by Lord Lytton)	Hanover
	Edward VII	9 November 1841	22 January 1901 – 6 May 1910	6 May 1910	Alexandra of Denmark	1 January 1903 (represented by Lord Curzon)	Saxe-Coburg and Gotha
	George V	3 June 1865	6 May 1910 – 20 January 1936	20 January 1936	Mary of Teck	12 December 1911	Saxe-Coburg and Gotha (1910–1917) Windsor (1917–1936)
	Edward VIII	23 June 1894	20 January 1936 – 11 December 1936	28 May 1972	None	None (Note: Edward VIII abdicated after less than one year of reign.)	Windsor
	George VI	14 December 1895	11 December 1936 – 15 August 1947	6 February 1952	Elizabeth Bowes-Lyon	None (Note: A durbar was deemed expensive and impractical due to poverty and demands for independence.)	Windsor

== List of governors-general ==
=== Fort William (Bengal) and India, 1600–1857 ===
Governor-General (Lifespan)	Term of office		Notable events	Appointed by
Governors-General of the Presidency of Fort William (Bengal), 1773–1833
Warren Hastings (1732–1818)	20 October 1773 (Note: Originally joined on 28 April 1772.)	8 February 1785	Regulating Act 1773; First Rohilla War (1773–1774); Supreme Court of Judicature at Fort William (1774) was established; Formation of Supreme Council of Bengal (1774); First Anglo-Maratha War (1775–1782); Formed Amini Commission (1776); Founded Calcutta Madrasa (Aliah University) (1780); James Augustus Hicky's Bengal Gazette (first Indian newspaper published (1780); Second Anglo-Mysore war (1780–1784); Asiatic Society of Bengal was established by Sir William Jones (1784); Pitt's India Act (1784); Creation of collector post; The first Governor General to be prosecuted for impeachment. As a consequence of his involvement in First Rohilla War; Experimentation on land settlements; Ended providing pension to the Mughal Emperor Shah Alam II; Abolished the Dual System in Bengal (which was introduced by Robert Clive); Moved Treasury from Murshidabad to Calcutta; Abolished Dastak system (which was introduced by Robert Clive); English translation of the Bhagwat Gita by Charles Wilkins	George III
Sir John Macpherson, 1st Baronet (acting) (1745–1821)	8 February 1785	12 September 1786		George III
The Earl Cornwallis (Note: Earl Cornwallis from 1762; created Marquess Cornwallis (1792).) (1738–1805)	12 September 1786	28 October 1793	Established lower courts and appellate courts; Third Anglo-Mysore war (1790–1792); Sanskrit Vidyalaya at Benaras (now Varanasi) established by Johnathan Duncan (then Governor of Bombay) (1791); Permanent Settlement in Bihar and Bengal (1793); Introduction of Cornwallis Code (1793); Introduction of Civil Services in India	George III
John Shore (1751–1834)	28 October 1793	18 March 1798	Policy of Non-intervention; Charter Act 1793; Second Rohilla War 1794; Battle of Kharda between Nizam and Marathas (1795)	George III
Lt. Gen Alured Clarke (acting) (1744–1832)	18 March 1798	18 May 1798		George III
Richard Wellesley, 1st Marquess Wellesley (Note: Created Marquess Wellesley (1799).) (1760–1842)	18 May 1798	30 July 1805	Introduction of Subsidiary Alliance (1798); Fourth Anglo Mysore War 1799; Censorship Act, 1799; Took over the administration of Tanjore (1799), Surat (1800) and Carnatica (1801); Fort William College at Calcutta (1800); The Subsidiary Treaty of Bassein (1802) and Second Anglo-Maratha War (1803–1805); Raj Bhavan at Calcutta was established (1803)	George III
Charles Cornwallis, 1st Marquess Cornwallis (1738–1805)	30 July 1805	5 October 1805		George III
George Barlow, 1st Baronet (acting) (1762–1847)	10 October 1805	31 July 1807	Sepoy mutiny at Vellore (1806) (prelude to the Indian Rebellion of 1857); Bank of Calcutta (1806) established (later Imperial Bank of India, now State Bank of India)	George III
Gilbert Elliot-Murray-Kynynmound, Lord Minto (1751–1814)	31 July 1807	4 October 1813	Treaty of Amritsar (1809) with Ranjit Singh; Treaty of Eternal Friendship (1809) with Talpur Rulers of Sindh; Charter Act 1813	George III
Francis Rawdon-Hastings (Note: Earl of Moira prior to being created Marquess of Hastings in 1816.) (1754–1826)	4 October 1813	9 January 1823	Ended the policy of Non-intervention; Anglo-Nepalese War (1814–1816) ended with the signing of Treaty of Sugauli (1816); Third Anglo-Maratha War (1816–1818) and the abolition of Peshwaship; Hindu College (now Presidency University) at Calcutta (1817); The Pindari War (1817–1818) (the complete destruction of the Pindaris); Subversion of Peshwa Baji Rao II and annexation of his territories to the Bombay Presidency (1818); Establishment of Ryotwari System in Madras Presidency (1820) by the governor Thomas Munro, 1st Baronet; Establishment of Mahalwari System in Northern India by Holt Mackenzie (1822); Bengal Tenancy Act was passed (1822); General Committee of Public Instruction was formed (1823)	George III
John Adam (acting) (1779–1825)	9 January 1823	1 August 1823	Licensing Regulations	George IV
William Amherst, 1st Earl Amherst (Note: Created Earl Amherst in 1826.) (1773–1857)	1 August 1823	13 March 1828	Barrackpore mutiny of 1824; Establishment of Sanskrit College at Calcutta (1824); First Anglo-Burmese War (1824–1826) (East India Company defeats Burmese King Bagyidaw and annexes Assam, Manipur, Arakan and Tenasserim); Treaty of Yandabo, 1826 (East India Company humiliates and extracts 1 million Pounds from the Burmese King Bagyidaw)	George IV
William Butterworth Bayley (acting) (1782–1860)	13 March 1828	4 July 1828		George IV
Governors-General of India, 1833–1858
Lord William Bentinck (1774–1839)	4 July 1828	20 March 1835	First Governor General of India; Bengal Sati Regulation, 1829; Suppression of Thuggee (1829–1835); Kol Rebellion (1831); Barasat Uprising (1831), led by Titumir; Annexation of Mysore (1831), Coorg (1834), and central Cachar (1834); Charter Act 1833 (administrative reforms as well as formalising the non-discrimination in employment of Indians by religion); English Education Act 1835 and introduction of English as a medium of instruction. English was also introduced by the Bengal government in the Calcutta Madrasa in 1829; Medical College and Hospital, Kolkata (1835); Abolition of the provincial courts of appeal and circuit set by Cornwallis, appointment of commissioners of revenue and circuit; Mahalwari System in Central India, Punjab and western Uttar Pradesh; Brahmo samaj established by Ram Mohan Roy	William IV
Charles Metcalfe, Baronet (acting) (1785–1846)	20 March 1835	4 March 1836	Repealed 1823 Licensing Regulations; Known as Liberator of India Press; Establishment of Calcutta Public Library (1836) (currently known as National Library of India)	William IV
George Eden, 1st Earl of Auckland (Note: Created Earl of Auckland in 1839.) (1784–1849)	4 March 1836	28 February 1842	Tripartite Treaty (1838) between British, Shah Shuja and Maharaja Ranjit Singh against Dost Muhammad Khan; First Bengali daily newspaper Sambad Prabhakar was published (1839); Tattwabodhini Sabha was formed by Debendranath Tagore (1839); First Anglo Afghan War (1840–1842) (Retreating British Army massacred by Afghan militias during the 1842 retreat from Kabul); Bank of Bombay (1840) established (later Imperial Bank of India, now State Bank of India)	William IV
Edward Law, Lord Ellenborough (1790–1871)	28 February 1842	June; 1844	Gwalior War (1843) (British defeat Marathas); Bank of Madras (1843) established (later Imperial Bank of India, now State Bank of India); Conquest and annexation of Sind Province (1843); Indian Slavery Act, 1843	Victoria
William Wilberforce Bird (acting) (1784–1857)	June; 1844	23 July 1844		Victoria
Henry Hardinge (Note: Created Viscount Hardinge in 1846.) (1785–1856)	23 July 1844	12 January 1848	The First Anglo-Sikh War (1845–1846) (British Empire defeats the Sikh Empire and confiscate major portion of its territory); Treaty of Lahore (1846) (British confiscated Kashmir from the Sikhs and sold it to Raja of Jammu for 75 lakh rupees); Treaty of Bhairowal (1846); Establishment of Roorkee Engineering College (1847)	Victoria
James Broun-Ramsay, Earl of Dalhousie (Note: Created Marquess of Dalhousie 1849.) (1812–1860)	12 January 1848	28 February 1856	Doctrine of Lapse (1848); Second Anglo-Sikh War (1848–1849) (The British totally defeated the Sikh Empire and annexed Punjab); Bethune Collegiate School (1849) (was also known as Calcutta Female School) was established by John Elliot Drinkwater Bethune; Religious Disabilities Act, 1850; First telegraph line was laid between Diamond Harbour to Calcutta (1851); Second Anglo-Burmese War (1852) (The sole aim of Dalhousie was to humiliate and annex more of Burmese Territories. Burma was attacked unprovoked); Charter Act, 1853; First Passenger train between Bombay and Thane (1853); Charles Wood Despatch (1854); Post Office Act, 1854; Established Public Works Department (1854); Santhal Rebellion (1855) (15,000 Santhals were killed by the British Army during the rebellion. Elephants were used to destroy Santhal Dwellings); Annexation of Oudh on the grounds of alleged internal misrule (1856); Establishment of summer capital at Shimla; Banned female infanticide completely and human sacrifice in Odisha and Maharashtra	Victoria
Charles Canning, Viscount Canning (Note: Created Earl Canning 1859.) (1812–1862)	28 February 1856	31 October 1858	Hindu Widows' Remarriage Act, 1856 (drafted by James Broun-Ramsay, Earl of Dalhousie); Indian Rebellion of 1857; University of Calcutta, University of Bombay, and University of Madras were set up (1857)	Victoria

=== Governors-General and Viceroys of India, 1858–1947 ===
Governor-General or Viceroy (Lifespan)	Term of office		Notable events	Secretary of State for India	Prime Minister
Governors-General and Viceroys of India, 1858–1947
Charles Canning, Viscount Canning (1812–1862)	1 November 1858	21 March 1862	Queen Victoria's Proclamation (1 November 1858) and The Government of India Act, 1858; Formation of Imperial Civil Services (1858); Indigo Revolt in Bengal (1859–1860); White mutiny by the European troops (1859); Enactment of Indian Penal Code (1860); Indian High Courts Act 1861; Indian Councils Act, 1861; Indian Civil Service Act, 1861; Police Act, 1861; Establishment of Archaeological Survey of India (1861); System of Budget was introduced; Introduced Portfolio System which gave foundation for Cabinet System	Lord Stanley; Charles Wood	Edward Smith-Stanley, 14th Earl of Derby; Viscount Palmerston
James Bruce, 8th Earl of Elgin (1811–1863)	21 March 1862	20 November 1863	Establishment of Calcutta High Court (2 July), Bombay High Court (14 August) and Madras High Court (15 August) (1862); Opened up Qing China and Japan to Western trade; Compelled the Qing to sign the Convention of Peking, annexing the Kowloon Peninsula to the British crown colony of Hong Kong	Charles Wood	Viscount Palmerston
Robert Napier (acting) (1810–1890)	21 November 1863	2 December 1863		Charles Wood	Viscount Palmerston
William Denison (acting) (1804–1871)	2 December 1863	12 January 1864		Charles Wood	Viscount Palmerston
John Lawrence, Baronet (1811–1879)	12 January 1864	12 January 1869	Bhutan War (1864–1865) (The British defeated an undefended Bhutan and annexed Assam and Bengal Duars); Establishment of Shimla as India's summer capital (1864); Establishment of Allahabad High Court (1866); Famine Commission was constituted (1867) under Henry Campbell due to Orissa famine of 1866; Tenancy Act was passed in Punjab and Oudh (1868)	Charles Wood; George Robinson, Earl de Grey; Viscount Cranborne; Stafford Northcote; George Campbell, 8th Duke of Argyll	Viscount Palmerston; John Russell, 1st Earl Russell; Edward Smith-Stanley, 14th Earl of Derby; Benjamin Disraeli; William Ewart Gladstone
Richard Bourke, 6th Earl of Mayo (1822–1872)	12 January 1869	8 February 1872	Keshub Chandra Sen establishes Indian Reform Association (1870); Started Financial decentralization (1870); Enacted IPC amendment-Sedition Act 1870 to tackle Wahabi Movement; Assassinated by Sher Ali Afridi (1872); Started the Census in India (1872); Established the Department of Agriculture and Commerce (1872); Established Statistical Survey of India (1872); Opening of Rajkumar college in Rajkot and Mayo College at Ajmer for political training of Indian Princes	George Campbell, 8th Duke of Argyll	William Ewart Gladstone
John Strachey (acting) (1823–1907)	9 February 1872	23 February 1872		George Campbell, 8th Duke of Argyll	William Ewart Gladstone
Francis Napier, 10th Lord Napier (acting) (1819–1898)	24 February 1872	3 May 1872		George Campbell, 8th Duke of Argyll	William Ewart Gladstone
Thomas Baring, Lord Northbrook (1826–1904)	3 May 1872	12 April 1876	He suppressed Kuka rebellion in Punjab led by Ram Singh (1872); Jyotiba Phule launches the Satyashodhak Samaj in Maharashtra (1873) against the caste system and the Untouchability practice; Trial of Gaekwad of Baroda (1874); Muhammadan Anglo-Oriental College founded by Sir Syed Ahmed Khan (1875); Prince of Wales Edward VII visited India (1875); Dramatic Performances Act, 1876; He resigned (1876), being asked by the British Prime Minister Benjamin Disraeli to make a treaty with the Emir of Afghanistan Sher Ali Khan	George Campbell, 8th Duke of Argyll; Robert Gascoyne-Cecil, 3rd Marquess of Salisbury	William Ewart Gladstone; Benjamin Disraeli
Robert Bulwer-Lytton, 1st Earl of Lytton (1831–1891)	12 April 1876	8 June 1880	Royal Titles Act, 1876 by which Queen Victoria assumed the title of 'Empress of India'; Great Famine of 1876–1878, a 'Famine Commission' was constituted under Richard Strachey (1878); First Delhi Durbar (of three) (1877); Vernacular Press Act, 1878; Arms Act, 1878; Second Anglo-Afghan War, (1878–1880); Treaty of Gandamak signed (1879); Decreased the maximum age of appearing in civil services from 21 to 19	Robert Gascoyne-Cecil, 3rd Marquess of Salisbury; Gathorne Gathorne-Hardy, Viscount Cranbrook; Marquess of Hartington	Benjamin Disraeli; William Ewart Gladstone
George Robinson, 1st Marquess of Ripon (1827–1909)	8 June 1880	13 December 1884	First Factory Act (1881); Negotiable Instruments Act, 1881; First complete Census in India (1881); Repeal of the Vernacular Press Act (1882); Establishment of Panjab University (1882); Government resolution on local self-government (1882); Appointment of Education Commission under Sir William Wilson Hunter (1882); Ilbert Bill (1883); Passed Famine codes (1883); Increased the maximum age of appearing in civil services from 18 to 21	Marquess of Hartington; John Wodehouse, 1st Earl of Kimberley	William Ewart Gladstone
Frederick Hamilton-Temple-Blackwood, Earl of Dufferin (1826–1902)	13 December 1884	10 December 1888	Formation of Indian National Congress (1885); Bengal Tenancy Act (1885); Third Anglo-Burmese War (1885); Burma was made a province of India, with Rangoon as its capital (1886)	John Wodehouse, 1st Earl of Kimberley; Lord Randolph Churchill; John Wodehouse, 1st Earl of Kimberley; R. A. Cross, 1st Viscount Cross	William Ewart Gladstone; Robert Gascoyne-Cecil, 3rd Marquess of Salisbury; William Ewart Gladstone; Robert Gascoyne-Cecil, 3rd Marquess of Salisbury
Henry Petty-Fitzmaurice, 5th Marquess of Lansdowne (1845–1927)	10 December 1888	21 January 1894	Age of Consent Act, 1891 was passed to prohibit the marriages of girl child under the age of 12; Second Factory Act 1891; Indian Councils Act 1892; Setting up the Durand Commission (1893) (India-Afghanistan)	R. A. Cross, 1st Viscount Cross; John Wodehouse, 1st Earl of Kimberley; Henry Fowler	Robert Gascoyne-Cecil, 3rd Marquess of Salisbury; William Ewart Gladstone; Archibald Primrose, 5th Earl of Rosebery
Victor Bruce, 9th Earl of Elgin (1849–1917)	21 January 1894	6 January 1899	Spread of Bubonic plague in Bombay (1896); Indian famine of 1896–1897; Establishment of the Ramakrishna Mission by Swami Vivekananda at Belur Math (1897); Assassination of two British officials (Walter Charles Rand and Ayerst) by the Chapekar brothers (1897)	Henry Fowler; Lord George Hamilton	Archibald Primrose, 5th Earl of Rosebery; Robert Gascoyne-Cecil, 3rd Marquess of Salisbury
George Curzon, 1st Marquess Curzon of Kedleston (Note: Oliver Russell, 2nd Baron Ampthill was acting Governor-General in 1904.) (1859–1925)	6 January 1899	18 November 1905	Indian famine of 1899–1900; Munda (Ulgulan) rebellion led by Birsa Munda (1899–1900); Department of Agriculture was constituted (1901); Creation of North-West Frontier Province (1901); Appointment of Police Commission under Andrew Frazer (1902); Appointment of Raleigh University Commission (1902) (Indian Universities Act, 1904 was passed as per the recommendation of this commission); Second Delhi Durbar (of three) (1903); Younghusband expedition to Tibet under Francis Younghusband (1903–1904); Benaras Hindu Girls School was established by Annie Besant (1904); Archaeological Department was established under Ancient Monuments Preservation Act 1904; Official Secrets Act 1904 to curb free press; Agricultural Research Institute at Pusa in Bihar was established (1905); Partition of Bengal (1905); Swadeshi Movement (1905–1911) against Partition of Bengal by Lal Bal Pal-Aurbindo Ghosh	Lord George Hamilton; William St John Brodrick	Robert Gascoyne-Cecil, 3rd Marquess of Salisbury; Arthur Balfour
Appointed by Edward VII (1901–1910)
Gilbert Elliot-Murray-Kynynmound, 4th Earl of Minto (1845–1914)	18 November 1905	23 November 1910	Establishment of Muslim League by Aga Khan III and Khwaja Salimullah (Nawab of Dhaka) (1906); Foundation of Jugantar revolutionary group in Bengal (1906); Foundation stone of 'Victoria Memorial' laid (1906); Split in Congress (1907) (in Surat session); Satyendra Prasanna Sinha became first Indian member to be appointed in Viceroy's Executive Council; Seditious meetings (prohibition) Act 1907 to curb the extremist movement; Jamsetji Tata established TISCO (1907); Newspapers Act 1908; Morley–Minto reforms (1909); Indian Press Act, 1910	William St John Brodrick; John Morley; Robert Crewe-Milnes, Earl of Crewe	Arthur Balfour; Henry Campbell-Bannerman; H. H. Asquith
Appointed by George V (1910–1936)
Charles Hardinge, 1st Baron Hardinge of Penshurst (1858–1944)	23 November 1910	4 April 1916	Third Delhi Durbar (1911); Annulment of Partition of Bengal by King George V (1911); Transfer of capital from Calcutta to New Delhi (1911); Partition of Bengal to form Bihar and Orissa province (1912); World War I (1914–1918); Komagata Maru incident (1914); McMahon border line was created between India and China (1914); Ghadar Mutiny (1915); Mahatma Gandhi came back to India from South Africa (1915); Foundation of Hindu Mahasabha by Madan Mohan Malviya (1915); Foundation of Banaras Hindu University (1916)	Robert Crewe-Milnes, Earl of Crewe; John Morley, 1st Viscount Morley of Blackburn; Robert Crewe-Milnes, 1st Marquess of Crewe; Austen Chamberlain	H. H. Asquith
Frederic Thesiger, 1st Viscount Chelmsford (1868–1933)	4 April 1916	2 April 1921	Formation of Indian Home Rule movement by Bal Gangadhar Tilak and Annie Besant (1916); First Women's University (SNDT Women's University) at Pune was founded by Dhondo Keshav Karve (1916); Lucknow Pact (1916) (between Indian National Congress and Muslim League); Champaran Satyagraha (1917), the first satyagraha movement led by Mahatma Gandhi in British India; August Declaration, 1917; Saddler University Commission or Calcutta Commission (1917); Kheda Satyagraha of 1918; Montagu–Chelmsford Reforms (1919); Government of India Act 1919; Rowlatt Act (1919); Jallianwala Bagh massacre (1919); Khilafat Movement (1919–1920) (later merged with Non-cooperation movement in 1920); Foundation of Aligarh Muslim University (1920); Non-cooperation movement (1920–1922); Imperial Bank of India (now State Bank of India established in 1921)	Austen Chamberlain; Edwin Montagu	H. H. Asquith; David Lloyd George
Rufus Isaacs, 1st Marquess of Reading (1860–1935)	2 April 1921	3 April 1926	Annulment of Press Act of 1910 and Rowlatt Act of 1919; Malabar rebellion (also known as Moplah Rebellion), first Ethnic Rebellion (1921); Rabindranath Tagore founded Visva-Bharati University (1921); Chauri Chaura incident (1922) and withdrawal of Non-cooperation movement by Mahatma Gandhi; Formation of Swaraj Party (1923); Appointment of Lee Commission (1923) on public services reforms; Railway budget was separated from general budget since 1924 (this tradition continued till 2016); Kakori train robbery (1925); Foundation of the Rashtriya Swayamsevak Sangh by K. B. Hedgewar (1925); Foundation of the Communist Party of India in Kanpur (1925)	Edwin Montagu; William Peel, Viscount Peel; Sydney Olivier, 1st Baron Olivier; F. E. Smith, 1st Earl of Birkenhead	David Lloyd George; Bonar Law; Stanley Baldwin; Ramsay MacDonald; Stanley Baldwin
E. F. L. Wood, Lord Irwin (1881–1959)	3 April 1926	18 April 1931	Simon Commission (1928); Nehru Report (1928); Death of Lala Lajpat Rai (1928); Fourteen Points of Jinnah (1929); Purna Swaraj declaration (1929); Meerut Conspiracy Case (1929); Bombing in Central Legislative Assembly by Bhagat Singh and Batukeshwar Dutt (8 April 1929); "Deepavali Declaration" (31 October 1929, to grant India dominion status in due course); Appointment of "Hartog Committee" (1929) to survey the growth of education in British India; Launching of Civil disobedience movement with Salt March (1930); Dharasana Satyagraha (1930); First Round Table Conferences (1930); Allahabad Address by Sir Muhammad Iqbal (1930); Chittagong armoury raid (1930); Gandhi–Irwin Pact (1931); Execution of Bhagat Singh, Shivaram Rajguru, and Sukhdev Thapar (1931)	F. E. Smith, 1st Earl of Birkenhead; William Peel, Viscount Peel	Stanley Baldwin; Ramsay MacDonald
George Goschen, 2nd Viscount Goschen (acting) (1866–1952)	29 June 1929	11 November 1929		William Peel, Viscount Peel, William Wedgwood Benn	Stanley Baldwin; Ramsay MacDonald
Freeman Freeman-Thomas, Earl of Willingdon (1866–1941)	18 April 1931	18 April 1936	Second Round Table Conference (1931); Announcement of Communal Award by Ramsay MacDonald (1932); Poona Pact between Mahatma Gandhi and B. R. Ambedkar (1932); Third Round Table Conference (1932); Pakistan Declaration (1933); Foundation of Congress Socialist Party (1934); Reserve Bank of India established by passing The Reserve Bank of India Act 1934; Government of India Act 1935; Formation of All India Kisan Sabha (1936)	William Wedgwood Benn; Samuel Hoare; Lawrence Dundas, 2nd Marquess of Zetland	Ramsay MacDonald; Stanley Baldwin
Appointed by Edward VIII (1936)
Victor Hope, 2nd Marquess of Linlithgow (1887–1952)	18 April 1936	1 October 1943	Indian provincial elections (1937); Indian entry into World War II (1939); Day of Deliverance (1939); Formation of All India Forward Bloc (1939); Lahore Resolution (1940); August Offer (1940); Cripps Mission (1942); Formation of Indian Legion (1942); Quit India Movement (1942); Formation of Indian National Army (1942); Bengal famine (1943)	Lawrence Dundas, 2nd Marquess of Zetland; Leo Amery	Stanley Baldwin; Neville Chamberlain; Winston Churchill
Appointed by George VI (1936–1947) (as Emperor of India)
Archibald Wavell, Viscount Wavell (1883–1950)	1 October 1943	21 February 1947	C. R. formula (1944); Simla Conference (1945); World War II ended (1945); Indian National Army (INA) trials (1945–1946); Cabinet Mission (1946); Direct Action Day (16 August 1946); Interim Government was formed (1946); Royal Indian Navy mutiny (1946)	Leo Amery; Frederick Pethick-Lawrence, 1st Baron Pethick-Lawrence	Winston Churchill; Clement Attlee
Louis Mountbatten, Viscount Mountbatten of Burma (1900–1979)	21 February 1947	15 August 1947	Indian Independence Act 1947 (18 July 1947); Radcliffe Commission was appointed under the chairmanship of Cyril Radcliffe to demarcate the border line of Bengal Presidency and Punjab Province	Frederick Pethick-Lawrence, 1st Baron Pethick-Lawrence; William Hare, 5th Earl of Listowel	Clement Attlee

=== Governors-General of the Dominion of India, 1947–1950 ===
Governor-General (Lifespan)	Term of office		Notable events	Prime Minister
Governors-General of the Dominion of India, 1947–1950
Appointed by George VI (1947–1950) (as King of India)
Louis Mountbatten, Viscount Mountbatten of Burma (Note: Created Earl Mountbatten of Burma on 28 October 1947.) (1900–1979)	15 August 1947	21 June 1948	First Governor-General of the Union of India	Jawaharlal Nehru
Chakravarti Rajagopalachari (1878–1972)	21 June 1948	26 January 1950	Last Governor-General of India, before the office was permanently abolished (1950); First and only Indian-born Governor-General of India	Jawaharlal Nehru

== List of Presidents of India ==
#	Name	Portrait	Term of office		Elected	Political party
1	Rajendra Prasad (1884–1963)		26 January 1950	13 May 1962	1950; 1952; 1955; 1957	Indian National Congress
2	Sir Sarvepalli Radhakrishnan (1888–1975)		13 May 1962	13 May 1967	1962; 1965	Independent
3	Zakir Husain (1897–1969)		13 May 1967	3 May 1969 (died in office.)	1967	Independent
4	V. V. Giri (1894–1980)		3 May 1969	20 July 1969	1969	Independent
5	Mohammad Hidayatullah (1905–1992)		20 July 1969	24 August 1969	1969	Independent
(4)	V. V. Giri (1894–1980)		24 August 1969	24 August 1973	1969	Independent
–	Gopal Swarup Pathak (1896–1982)		24 August 1973	24 August 1973	–	Independent
(4)	V. V. Giri (1894–1980)		24 August 1973	24 August 1974	–	Independent
6	Fakhruddin Ali Ahmed (1905–1977)		24 August 1974	11 February 1977 (died in office.)	1974	Indian National Congress
7	B. D. Jatti (1912–2002)		11 February 1977	25 July 1977	—	Indian National Congress
8	Neelam Sanjiva Reddy (1913–1996)		25 July 1977	25 July 1982	1977	Janata Party
9	Giani Zail Singh (1916–1994)		25 July 1982	25 July 1983	1982	Indian National Congress
(5)	Mohammad Hidayatullah (1905–1992)		25 July 1983	25 July 1983	—	Indian National Congress
(9)	Giani Zail Singh (1916–1994)		25 July 1983	25 July 1984	—	Indian National Congress
(5)	Mohammad Hidayatullah (1905–1992)		25 July 1984	25 July 1984	—	Indian National Congress
(9)	Giani Zail Singh (1916–1994)		25 July 1984	25 July 1987	1984	Indian National Congress
10	R. Venkataraman (1910–2009)		25 July 1987	25 July 1992	1987	Indian National Congress
11	Shankar Dayal Sharma (1918–1999)		25 July 1992	25 July 1997	1992	Indian National Congress
12	K. R. Narayanan (1920–2005)		25 July 1997	25 July 2000	1997	Indian National Congress
–	Krishan Kant (1927–2002)		25 July 2000	25 July 2000	–	Indian National Congress
(12)	K. R. Narayanan (1920–2005)		25 July 2000	25 July 2002	–	Indian National Congress
13	A. P. J. Abdul Kalam (1931–2015)		25 July 2002	25 July 2003	2002	Independent
–	Bhairon Singh Shekhawat (1923–2010)		25 July 2003	25 July 2003	–	Independent
(13)	A. P. J. Abdul Kalam (1931–2015)		25 July 2003	25 July 2007	–	Independent
14	Pratibha Patil (1934–)		25 July 2007	25 July 2010	2007	Indian National Congress
–	Mohammad Hamid Ansari(1937–)		25 July 2010	25 July 2010	–	Indian National Congress
(14)	Pratibha Patil (1934–)		25 July 2010	25 July 2012	–	Indian National Congress
15	Pranab Mukherjee (1935–2020)		25 July 2012	25 July 2016	2012	Indian National Congress
–	Mohammad Hamid Ansari(1937–)		25 July 2016	25 July 2016	–	Indian National Congress
(15)	Pranab Mukherjee (1935–2020)		25 July 2016	25 July 2017	–	Indian National Congress
16	Ram Nath Kovind (1945–)		25 July 2017	25 July 2018	2017	Bharatiya Janata Party
_	M. Venkaiah Naidu (1949–)		25 July 2018	25 July 2018	–	Bharatiya Janata Party
(16)	Ram Nath Kovind (1945–)		25 July 2018	25 July 2022	–	Bharatiya Janata Party
17	Droupadi Murmu (1958-)		25 July 2022	11 August 2022	2022	Bharatiya Janata Party
–	Jagdeep Dhankhar (1951–)		11 August 2022	11 August 2022	–	Bharatiya Janata Party
17	Droupadi Murmu (1958-)		11 August 2022	12 September 2025	–	Bharatiya Janata Party
—	C. P. Radhakrishnan(1957-)		12 September 2025	12 September 2025		Bharatiya Janata Party
17	Droupadi Murmu (1958–)		12 September 2025	Incumbent		Bharatiya Janata Party

== List of vice presidents of India ==
Independent candidate
Indian National Congress
Bharatiya Janata Party
Janata Dal

Key

^{†}-Died in office
^{⸸}-Resigned

#	Portrait	Name	Term of office			Election	President	Party
1	Sarvepalli Radhakrishnan	Sarvepalli Radhakrishnan	13 May 1952	12 May 1957	9 years, 364 days	1952	Rajendra Prasad	Independent
1	Sarvepalli Radhakrishnan	Sarvepalli Radhakrishnan	13 May 1957	12 May 1962	9 years, 364 days	1957	Rajendra Prasad	Independent
2	Zakir Hussain	Zakir Husain	13 May 1962	12 May 1967	4 years, 364 days	1962	Sarvepalli Radhakrishnan	Independent
3	V.V. Giri	V. V. Giri ^{⸸}	13 May 1967	3 May 1969	1 year, 355 days	1967	Zakir Hussain	Independent
4		Gopal Swarup Pathak	31 August 1969	30 August 1974	4 years, 364 days	1969	V. V. Giri Fakhruddin Ali Ahmed	Independent
5	B.D. Jatti	B. D. Jatti	31 August 1974	30 August 1979	4 years, 364 days	1974	Fakhruddin Ali Ahmed Neelam Sanjiva Reddy	Indian National Congress
6		Mohammad Hidayatullah	31 August 1979	30 August 1984	4 years, 365 days	1979	Neelam Sanjiva Reddy Zail Singh	Independent
7	R Venkataraman	Ramaswamy Venkataraman ^{⸸}	31 August 1984	24 July 1987	2 years, 327 days	1984	Zail Singh	Indian National Congress
8	Shankar Dayal Sharma	Shankar Dayal Sharma ^{⸸}	3 September 1987	24 July 1992	4 years, 325 days	1987	Ramaswamy Venkataraman	Indian National Congress
9	K.R. Narayanan	K. R. Narayanan ^{⸸}	21 August 1992	24 July 1997	4 years, 337 days	1992	Shankar Dayal Sharma	Indian National Congress
10		Krishan Kant^{†}	21 August 1997	27 July 2002	4 years, 340 days	1997	K. R. Narayanan A. P. J. Abdul Kalam	Janata Dal
11	Bhairon Singh Shekhawat	Bhairon Singh Shekhawat ^{⸸}	19 August 2002	21 July 2007	4 years, 336 days	2002	A. P. J. Abdul Kalam	Bharatiya Janata Party
12	Hamid Ansari	Mohammad Hamid Ansari	11 August 2007	10 August 2012	9 years, 364 days	2007	Pratibha Patil	Indian National Congress
12	Hamid Ansari	Mohammad Hamid Ansari	11 August 2012	10 August 2017	9 years, 364 days	2012	Pranab Mukherjee Ram Nath Kovind	Indian National Congress
13	Venkaiah Naidu	Venkaiah Naidu	11 August 2017	11 August 2022	5 years, 0 days	2017	Ram Nath Kovind Droupadi Murmu	Bharatiya Janata Party
14	Jagdeep Dhankhar	Jagdeep Dhankhar	11 August 2022	21 July 2025	2 years, 344 days	2022	Droupadi Murmu	Bharatiya Janata Party
15		C. P. Radhakrishnan	12 September 2025	Incumbent	22 days	2025	Droupadi Murmu	Bharatiya Janata Party

== List of presidents of the Board of Control ==
President of the Board of Control
Whig Tory Conservative
Portrait	Name Honorifics and constituency	Term of office		Party	Ministry
	Thomas Townshend, 1st Viscount Sydney before 1789; Viscount Sydney after 1789	4 September 1784	6 March 1790	Whig	Pitt I
	William Grenville, 1st Baron Grenville	6 March 1790	22 June 1793	Tory (Pittite)	Pitt I
	Henry Dundas, 1st Viscount Melville; MP for Edinburgh	22 June 1793	25 April 1801	Tory	Pitt I
	George Legge, 3rd Earl of Dartmouth	25 April 1801	2 July 1802	Tory	Addington
‍	Robert Stewart, Viscount Castlereagh; MP for Down before 1805; MP for Boroughbridge after 1806	2 July 1802	11 February 1806	Tory	Addington
	Robert Stewart, Viscount Castlereagh; MP for Down before 1805; MP for Boroughbridge after 1806	2 July 1802	11 February 1806	Tory	Pitt II
	Gilbert Elliot-Murray-Kynynmound, 1st Earl of Minto	11 February 1806	15 July 1806	Whig	All the Talents (Whig–Tory)
	Thomas Grenville; MP for Buckingham	15 July 1806	30 September 1806	Whig	All the Talents (Whig–Tory)
	George Tierney; MP for Athlone	30 September 1806	6 April 1807	Whig	All the Talents (Whig–Tory)
	Robert Dundas, 2nd Viscount Melville; MP for Midlothian	6 April 1807	11 July 1809	Tory	Portland II
	Dudley Ryder, 1st Earl of Harrowby	11 July 1809	November; 1809	Tory	Portland II
	Dudley Ryder, 1st Earl of Harrowby	11 July 1809	November; 1809	Tory	Perceval
	Robert Dundas, 2nd Viscount Melville; MP for Midlothian before 1811; Viscount Melville after 1811	November; 1809	4 April 1812	Tory	Perceval
	Robert Hobart, 4th Earl of Buckinghamshire	4 April 1812	4 June 1816	Tory	Perceval
	Robert Hobart, 4th Earl of Buckinghamshire	4 April 1812	4 June 1816	Tory	Liverpool
	George Canning; MP for Liverpool	4 June 1816	June; 1821	Tory	Liverpool
	Charles Bathurst; MP for Harwich	June; 1821	4 February 1822		Liverpool
	Charles Williams-Wynn (1775–1850); MP for Montgomeryshire	4 February 1822	4 February 1828	Tory	Liverpool
	Charles Williams-Wynn (1775–1850); MP for Montgomeryshire	4 February 1822	4 February 1828	Tory	Canning (Canningite–Whig)
	Charles Williams-Wynn (1775–1850); MP for Montgomeryshire	4 February 1822	4 February 1828	Tory	Goderich (Canningite–Whig)
	Charles Williams-Wynn (1775–1850); MP for Montgomeryshire	4 February 1822	4 February 1828	Tory	Wellington–Peel
	Robert Dundas, 2nd Viscount Melville	4 February 1828	17 September 1828	Tory	Wellington–Peel
	Edward Law, 1st Earl of Ellenborough	17 September 1828	1 December 1830	Tory	Wellington–Peel
	Charles Grant, 1st Baron Glenelg; MP for Inverness-shire	1 December 1830	18 September 1834	Whig	Grey
	Charles Grant, 1st Baron Glenelg; MP for Inverness-shire	1 December 1830	18 September 1834	Whig	Melbourne I
	Edward Law, 1st Earl of Ellenborough	18 September 1834	23 April 1835	Conservative	Peel I
	John Hobhouse, 1st Baron Broughton; MP for Nottingham	23 April 1835	30 August 1841	Whig	Melbourne II
	Edward Law, 1st Earl of Ellenborough	4 September 1841	23 October 1841	Conservative	Peel II
	William Vesey-FitzGerald, 2nd Baron FitzGerald and Vesey	23 October 1841	17 May 1843	Conservative	Peel II
	F. J. Robinson, 1st Viscount Goderich	17 May 1843	30 June 1846	Conservative	Peel II
	John Hobhouse, 1st Baron Broughton; MP for Nottingham before 1847; MP for Harwich after 1848	8 July 1846	5 February 1852	Whig	Russell
	Fox Maule-Ramsay, 11th Earl of Dalhousie; MP for Perth	5 February 1852	21 February 1852	Whig	Russell
	John Charles Herries; MP for Stamford	28 February 1852	17 December 1852	Conservative	Who? Who?
	Charles Wood, 1st Viscount Halifax; MP for Halifax	30 December 1852	3 March 1855	Whig	Aberdeen (Peelite–Whig)
	Robert Vernon; MP for Northampton	3 March 1855	21 February 1858	Whig	Palmerston I
	Edward Law, 1st Earl of Ellenborough	6 March 1858	5 June 1858	Conservative	Derby–Disraeli II
	Edward Stanley, 15th Earl of Derby; MP for King's Lynn	5 June 1858	2 August 1858	Conservative	Derby–Disraeli II

Edward Stanley, 15th Earl of Derby took up the new post of Secretary of State for India on 2 August 1858, upon the establishment of the British Raj.

== Secretaries of state for India, 1858–1948 ==
Portrait	Name	Term of office		Political party	Prime Minister
	Lord Stanley; MP for King's Lynn	2 August 1858	11 June 1859	Conservative	Edward Smith-Stanley, 14th Earl of Derby
	Sir Charles Wood; MP for Halifax until 1865; MP for Ripon after 1865	18 June 1859	16 February 1866	Liberal	Henry John Temple, 3rd Viscount Palmerston
	Sir Charles Wood; MP for Halifax until 1865; MP for Ripon after 1865	18 June 1859	16 February 1866	Liberal	John Russell, 1st Earl Russell
	George Robinson, 3rd Earl de Grey	16 February 1866	26 June 1866	Liberal	John Russell, 1st Earl Russell
	Robert Gascoyne-Cecil, Viscount Cranborne; MP for Stamford	6 July 1866	8 March 1867	Conservative	Edward Smith-Stanley, 14th Earl of Derby
	Sir Stafford Northcote; MP for North Devonshire	8 March 1867	1 December 1868	Conservative	Edward Smith-Stanley, 14th Earl of Derby
	Sir Stafford Northcote; MP for North Devonshire	8 March 1867	1 December 1868	Conservative	Benjamin Disraeli
	George Campbell, 8th Duke of Argyll	9 December 1868	17 February 1874	Liberal	William Ewart Gladstone
	Robert Gascoyne-Cecil, 3rd Marquess of Salisbury	21 February 1874	2 April 1878	Conservative	Benjamin Disraeli
	Gathorne Gathorne-Hardy, 1st Viscount Cranbrook	2 April 1878	21 April 1880	Conservative	Benjamin Disraeli
	Spencer Cavendish, Marquess of Hartington; MP for North East Lancashire	28 April 1880	16 December 1882	Liberal	William Ewart Gladstone
	John Wodehouse, 1st Earl of Kimberley	16 December 1882	9 June 1885	Liberal	William Ewart Gladstone
	Lord Randolph Churchill; MP for Paddington South	24 June 1885	28 January 1886	Conservative	Robert Gascoyne-Cecil, 3rd Marquess of Salisbury
	John Wodehouse, 1st Earl of Kimberley	6 February 1886	20 July 1886	Liberal	William Ewart Gladstone
	R. A. Cross, 1st Viscount Cross	3 August 1886	11 August 1892	Conservative	Robert Gascoyne-Cecil, 3rd Marquess of Salisbury
	John Wodehouse, 1st Earl of Kimberley	18 August 1892	10 March 1894	Liberal	William Ewart Gladstone
	Henry Fowler; MP for Wolverhampton East	10 March 1894	21 June 1895	Liberal	Archibald Primrose, 5th Earl of Rosebery
	Lord George Hamilton; MP for Ealing	4 July 1895	9 October 1903	Conservative	Robert Gascoyne-Cecil, 3rd Marquess of Salisbury (Unionist Coalition)
	Lord George Hamilton; MP for Ealing	4 July 1895	9 October 1903	Conservative	Arthur Balfour (Unionist Coalition)
	William St John Brodrick; MP for Guildford	9 October 1903	4 December 1905	Irish Unionist	Arthur Balfour (Unionist Coalition)
	John Morley; MP for Montrose Burghs until 1908; Viscount Morley of Blackburn after 1908	10 December 1905	3 November 1910	Liberal	Sir Henry Campbell-Bannerman
	John Morley; MP for Montrose Burghs until 1908; Viscount Morley of Blackburn after 1908	10 December 1905	3 November 1910	Liberal	H. H. Asquith
	Robert Crewe-Milnes, 1st Earl of Crewe	3 November 1910	7 March 1911	Liberal	H. H. Asquith
	John Morley, 1st Viscount Morley of Blackburn	7 March 1911	25 May 1911	Liberal	H. H. Asquith
	Robert Crewe-Milnes, 1st Marquess of Crewe	25 May 1911	25 May 1915	Liberal	H. H. Asquith
	Austen Chamberlain; MP for Birmingham West	25 May 1915	17 July 1917	Conservative	H. H. Asquith (Coalition) David Lloyd George (Coalition)
	Edwin Montagu; MP for Chesterton until 1918; MP for Cambridgeshire after 1918	17 July 1917	19 March 1922	Liberal	H. H. Asquith (Coalition) David Lloyd George (Coalition)
	William Peel, 2nd Viscount Peel	19 March 1922	22 January 1924	Conservative	Bonar Law
	William Peel, 2nd Viscount Peel	19 March 1922	22 January 1924	Conservative	Stanley Baldwin
	Sydney Olivier, 1st Baron Olivier	22 January 1924	3 November 1924	Labour	Ramsay MacDonald
	F. E. Smith, 1st Earl of Birkenhead	6 November 1924	18 October 1928	Conservative	Stanley Baldwin
	William Peel, 2nd Viscount Peel	18 October 1928	4 June 1929	Conservative	Stanley Baldwin
	William Wedgwood Benn; MP for Aberdeen North	7 June 1929	24 August 1931	Labour	Ramsay MacDonald
	Sir Samuel Hoare; MP for Chelsea	25 August 1931	7 June 1935	Conservative	Ramsay MacDonald (1st & 2nd National Min.)
	Lawrence Dundas, 2nd Marquess of Zetland	7 June 1935	28 May 1937	Conservative	Stanley Baldwin (3rd National Min.)

=== Secretaries of state for India and Burma, 1937–1947 ===
Portrait	Name	Term of office		Political party	Prime Minister
	Lawrence Dundas, 2nd Marquess of Zetland	28 May 1937	13 May 1940	Conservative	Neville Chamberlain (4th National Min.; War Coalition)
	Leo Amery; MP for Birmingham Sparkbrook	13 May 1940	26 July 1945	Conservative	Winston Churchill (War Coalition; Caretaker Min.)
	Frederick Pethick-Lawrence, 1st Baron Pethick-Lawrence	3 August 1945	17 April 1947	Labour	Clement Attlee
	The Right Honourable; William Hare, 5th Earl of Listowel	17 April 1947	14 August 1947	Labour	Clement Attlee

=== Secretaries of state for Burma, 1947–1948 ===
Portrait	Name	Term of office		Political party	Prime Minister
	The Right Honourable; William Hare, 5th Earl of Listowel	14 August 1947	4 January 1948	Labour	Clement Attlee

== Vakil-i-Mutlaq ==
Vakil of the Mughal Empire
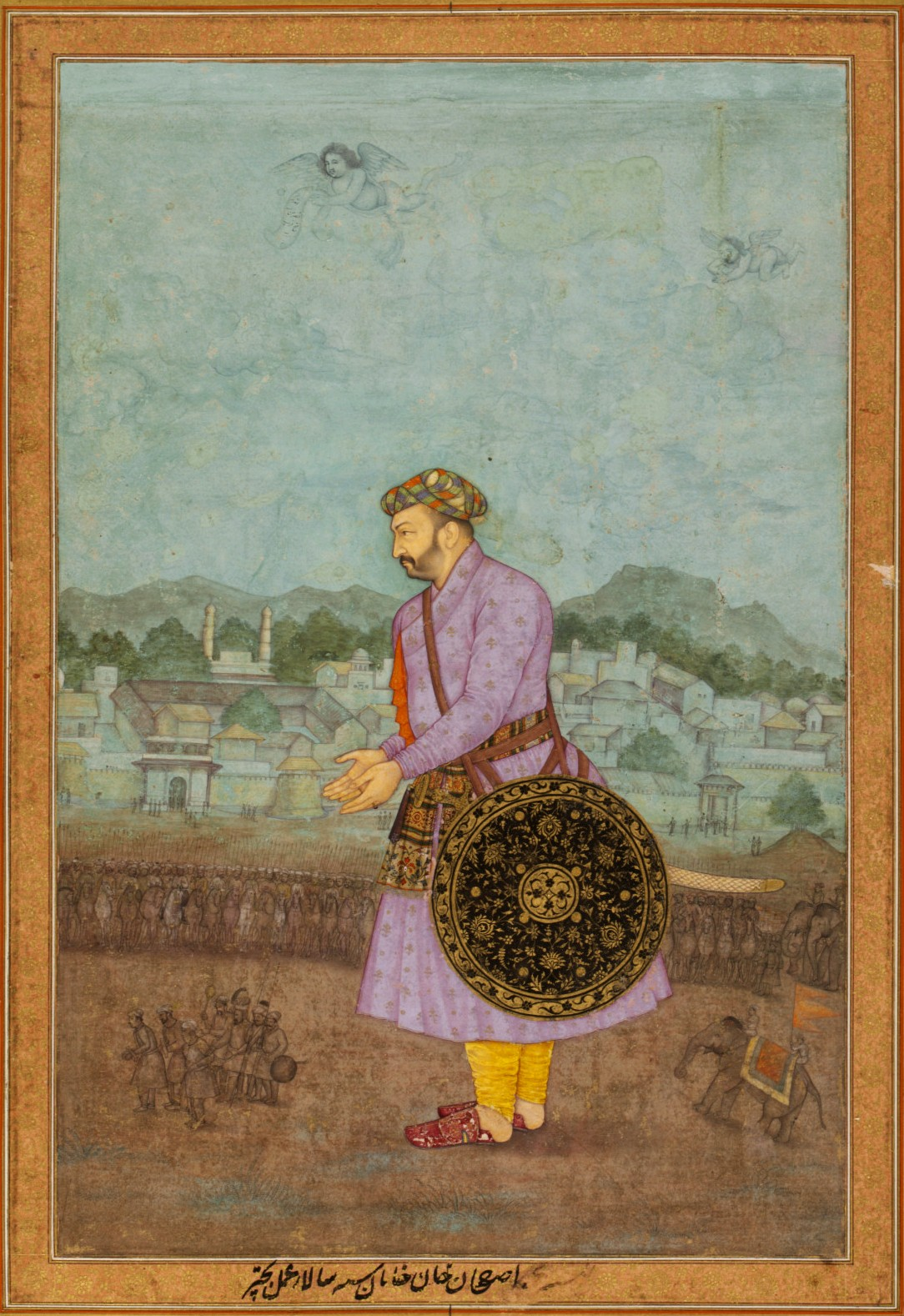
- Abu'l-Hasan Asaf Khan
- Style: His Excellency
- Residence: House of Rule
- Appointer: The Emperor
- Formation: 21 April 1526
- First holder: Mir Khalifa
- Final holder: Daulat Rao Sindhia
- Abolished: 9 April 1818

The Vakil-i-Mutlaq (Persian: وکیلِ مطلق), variously translated as the Lieutenant Plenipotentiary, the Regent Plenipotentiary, the Vicegerent or the Imperial Regent, was an important office in the Government of the Mughal Empire, first in ministerial hierarchy and only next to Mughal Emperor. Vekil is an Arabic word which means "representative". The Vakil was considered as the Emperor's lieutenant in all matters connected with the realm and household. From the reign of Emperor Babur to Emperor Shah Jahan, the title of grand vizier was also given to the Vakil. But afterwards it remained only as dignitary post.

The degree of powers of the Vakil's office varied from era to era. However the Vakil required Emperor's approval in each and every decision. During the era of Babur and Humayun, he had the powers of prime minister while early in the reign of Akbar, Vakil Bairam Khan acted as regent and ruled on the behalf of Emperor. Bairam Khan had his own Vakil-i-Mutlaq, who in this case was a general manager. This position was held by Pir Muhammad Khan Shirwani and when he was temporarily dismissed, given to Haji Muhammad Sistani. In 1564, Akbar revived the office of Vakil and didn't give him the responsibilities of finance department. In the reign of Jahangir, the office of Imperial Diwan gained prominence and ultimately during Shah Jahan's regime, the title of grand vizier was transferred from Vakil's office to Imperial Diwan.

== List of prime ministers of India ==
N	Portrait	Name	Term of office		Notable events	Emperor
1		Amir Nizamuddin Khalifa	1526	1540	1st Battle of panipat Battle of Khanwa	Babur (1526 – 1530) & Humayun (1530 – 1540)
2		Qaracha Khan	1540	1550	He was a governor of qandhar and humayun appoint him as Grand-Vizier of the Mughal State.	Humayun (1530 – 1556)
3		Bairam Khan	1550	1560		Akbar-i-Azam اکبر اعظم (1556–1605)
4		Munim Khan	1560	1565		Akbar-i-Azam اکبر اعظم (1556–1605)
5		Muzaffar Khan Turbati	1575	1579	No Vakil was appointed after his appointment to governorship in Bengal from 1579 until 1589	Akbar-i-Azam اکبر اعظم (1556–1605)
6		Abu'l-Fazl ibn Mubarak	1579	1602		Akbar-i-Azam اکبر اعظم (1556–1605)
7		Khanzada Abdur Rahim	1589	1595		Akbar-i-Azam اکبر اعظم (1556–1605)
8		Mirza Aziz Koka	1595	1605		Akbar-i-Azam اکبر اعظم (1556–1605)
9		Sharif Khan	1605	1611		Jahangir جہانگیر (1605–1627)
10		Mirza Ghias Beg	1611	1622		Jahangir جہانگیر (1605–1627)
11		Abu'l-Hasan Asaf Khan	1622	1630		Jahangir جہانگیر (1605–1627)
12		Afzal Khan Shirazi	1630	1639		Shah Jahan شاہ جہان (1628–1658)
13		Islam Khan Mashadi	1639	1640		Shah Jahan شاہ جہان (1628–1658)
14		Shaikh Ilam-ud-Din Ansari	1640	1642		Shah Jahan شاہ جہان (1628–1658)
15		Sadullah Khan	1642	1656	Taj Mahal completed	Shah Jahan شاہ جہان (1628–1658)
16		Mir Jumla	1656	1657		Alamgir I عالمگیر (1658–1707)
17		Jafar Khan	1657	1658		Alamgir I عالمگیر (1658–1707)
18		Fazil Khan	1658	1663		Alamgir I عالمگیر (1658–1707)
(17)		Jafar Khan	1663	1670		Alamgir I عالمگیر (1658–1707)
19		Asad Khan	1675	1707	Mughal–Maratha Wars; Anglo-Mughal War	Alamgir I عالمگیر (1658–1707)
20		Mun'im Khan	1707	1711		Bahadur Shah I بہادر شاہ (1707–1712)
21		Hidayatullah Khan	1711	1713		Jahandar Shah جہاندار شاہ (1712–1713)
22		Zulfiqar Khan Nusrat Jung	1712	1713		Jahandar Shah جہاندار شاہ (1712–1713)
23		Mir Rustam Ali Khan	1710	1737		Farrukhsiyar فرخ سیر (1713–1719)
24		Sayyid Hassan Ali Khan Barha	1713	1720	Mughal throne occupied by a series of puppet rulers under the Syed brothers.	Farrukhsiyar فرخ سیر (1713–1719)
25		Muhammad Amin Khan Turani	1720	1721		Muhammad Shah محمد شاہ (1719–1748)
26		Mir Qamar-ud-Din Khan Asaf Jah I	1721	1724		Muhammad Shah محمد شاہ (1719–1748)
27		Mir Fazil Qamar-ud-Din Khan	1724	1731	Battle of Delhi (1737); Battle of Bhopal; Nader Shah's invasion of Mughal Empire; Battle of Karnal; First invasion of Ahmad Shah Durrani; Battle of Manupur (1748)	Muhammad Shah محمد شاہ (1719–1748)
28		Saadat Ali Khan I	1731	19 March 1739	Battle of Delhi (1737); Battle of Bhopal; Nader Shah's invasion of Mughal Empire; Battle of Karnal; First invasion of Ahmad Shah Durrani; Battle of Manupur (1748)	Muhammad Shah محمد شاہ (1719–1748)
(27)		Mir Fazil Qamar-ud-Din Khan	19 March 1739	1748	Battle of Delhi (1737); Battle of Bhopal; Nader Shah's invasion of Mughal Empire; Battle of Karnal; First invasion of Ahmad Shah Durrani; Battle of Manupur (1748)	Muhammad Shah محمد شاہ (1719–1748)
29		Safdar Jang	1748	1753	Second invasion of Ahmad Shah Durrani; Third invasion of Ahmad Shah Durrani; Battle of Lahore (1752)	Ahmad Shah Bahadur احمد شاہ بہادر (1748–1754)
30		Intizam-ud-Daulah	1753	1754		Ahmad Shah Bahadur احمد شاہ بہادر (1748–1754)
31		Muhammad Muqim	1 October 1754	5 October 1754		Ahmad Shah Bahadur احمد شاہ بہادر (1748–1754)
32		Imad-ul-Mulk Feroze Jung	1754	1760	Black Hole of Calcutta; Battle of Plassey	Alamgir II عالمگیر دوم (1754–1759)
33		Jalal-ud-din Haider Abul-Mansur Khan	1760	1775	Third Battle of Panipat; Battle of Buxar; Treaty of Allahabad	Shah Alam II شاہ عالم دوم (1760–1806)
34		Mirza Jawan Bakht	1760	1775		Shah Alam II شاہ عالم دوم (1760–1806)
35		Asaf-ud-Daula	1775	1784		Shah Alam II شاہ عالم دوم (1760–1806)
(34)		Mirza Jawan Bakht	1784	1784		Shah Alam II شاہ عالم دوم (1760–1806)
(35)		Asaf-ud-Daula	1784	1797		Shah Alam II شاہ عالم دوم (1760–1806)
36		Wazir Ali Khan	21 September 1797	21 January 1798		Shah Alam II شاہ عالم دوم (1760–1806)

=== List of Prime Minister ===
N	Portrait	Personal Name	Reign	Birth	Death
(36)		Wazir Ali Khanوزیر علی خان	21 September 1797 – 21 January 1798	1780	1817
37		Saadat Ali Khan IIسعادت علی خان	21 January 1798 – 11 July 1814	1752	1814
38		Ghazi-ud-Din Haidar Shahغازی الدیں حیدر شاہ	11 July 1814 – 19 October 1827	1769	1827
39		Nasir-ud-Din Haidar Shahناصر الدیں حیدر شاہ	19 October 1827 – 7 July 1837	1827	1837
40		Muhammad Ali Shahمحمّد علی شاہ	7 July 1837 – 7 May 1842	1777	1842
42		Amjad Ali Shahامجد علی شاہ	7 May 1842 – 13 February 1847	1801	1847
43		Wajid Ali Shahواجد علی شاہ	13 February 1847 – 11 February 1856	1822	1 September 1887
44		Begum hazrat Mahalبیگم حضرت محل	11 February 1856 – 5 July1857 Wife of Wajid Ali Shah and mother of Birjis Qadra (in rebellion)	1820	7 April 1879
45		Birjis Qadrبر جیس قدر	5 July 1857 – 3 March 1858 (in rebellion)	1845	14 August 1893

=== List of Prime Minister ===
N	Portrait	Birth Name	Reign	Birth	Death	Notes
46		Abu Zafar Siraj al-Din Muhammad	3 March 1858 – 7 November 1862 (19 years, 360 days)	24 October 1775 Delhi, India	7 November 1862 (aged 87) Rangoon, Myanmar	Last Mughal Emperor. Deposed by the British and was exiled to Burma after the rebellion of 1857.

=== List of prime ministers of India ===
No.	Portrait	Name (birth and death)	Term of office		Party
No.	Portrait	Name (birth and death)	Took office	Left office	Party
47		Charles Wood	1862	1862	Independent
48		Jung Bahadur Rana	1862	1862	Independent
49		Dost Mohammad Khan	1862	1862	Independent
50		Jyotirao Phule	1862	1863	Independent
51		James Bruce	1863	1863	Independent
52		Dayananda Saraswati	1863	1863	Independent
53		Ramakrishna	1863	1863	Independent
54		Sher Ali Khan	1863	1863	Independent
55		Takht Singh	1863	1863	Independent
56		John Lawrence	1863	1863	Independent
57		Debendranath Tagore	1863	1870	Independent
58		Syed Ahmad Khan	1870	1875	Independent
59		Mohsin-ul-Mulk	1875	1880	Independent
60		Mir Turab Ali Khan, Salar Jung I	1880	1883	Independent
61		Ranodip Singh Kunwar	1883	1883	Independent
62		Mir Laiq Ali Khan, Salar Jung II	1883	1883	Independent
63		Keshub Chandra Sen	1883	1883	Independent
64		Herbert Spencer	1884	1885	Independent
65		Bhikaiji Cama	1885	1885	Independent
66		Abhayananda	1885	1885	Independent
67		Jaswant Singh II	1885	1885	Independent
68		John Wodehouse	1885	1885	Independent
69		Frederick Hamilton	1885	1885	Independent

=== List of prime ministers of India ===
Legend

No.	Portrait	Name	Term of office	Appointed by	Party
70	An image of Womesh Chandra Bonnerjee.	Womesh Chandra Bonnerjee	1885	Bombay	Indian National Congress
71	An image of Dadabhai Naoroji.	Dadabhai Naoroji	1886	Calcutta	
72	An image of Badruddin Tyabji.	Badruddin Tyabji	1887	Madras	
73	An image of George Yule.	George Yule	1888	Allahabad	
74	An image of William Wedderburn.	William Wedderburn	1889	Bombay	
75	An image of Pherozesha Mehta.	Pherozeshah Mehta	1890	Calcutta	
76		Panapakkam Anandacharlu	1891	Nagpur	
(70))	An image of Womesh Chandra Bonnerjee.	Womesh Chandra Bonnerjee	1892	Allahabad	
(71)	An image of Dadabhai Naoroji.	Dadabhai Naoroji	1893	Lahore	
77	An image of Alfred Webb.	Alfred Webb	1894	Madras	
78	An image of Surendranath Banerjee.	Surendranath Banerjee	1895	Poona	
79	An image of Rahimtulla M. Sayani.	Rahimtulla M. Sayani	1896	Calcutta	
80	An image of C Sankaran Nair.	C. Sankaran Nair	1897	Amaravati	
81	An image of Anandamohan Bose.	Anandamohan Bose	1898	Madras	
82	An image of Romesh Chunder Dutt.	Romesh Chunder Dutt	1899	Lucknow	
83	An image of N. G. Chandavarkar.	N. G. Chandavarkar	1900	Lahore	
84	An image of Dinshaw Edulji Wacha.	Dinshaw Edulji Wacha	1901	Calcutta	Indian National Congress
85		Swami Vivekananda	1902		
86	An image of Surendranath Banerjee.	Surendranath Banerjee	1902	Ahmedabad	
87		Lalmohan Ghosh	1903	Madras	
88	An image of Henry Cotton.	Henry John Stedman Cotton	1904	Bombay	
89	An image of Gopal Krishna Gokhale.	Gopal Krishna Gokhale	1905	Banaras	
90	An image of Dadabhai Naoroji.	Dadabhai Naoroji	1906	Calcutta	
91	An image of Rashbihari Ghosh.	Rashbihari Ghosh	1907	Surat	
91	An image of Rashbihari Ghosh.	Rashbihari Ghosh	1908	Madras	
92	An image of Madan Mohan Malaviya.	Madan Mohan Malaviya	1909	Lahore	
93	An image of William Wedderburn.	William Wedderburn	1910	Allahabad	
94		Bishan Narayan Dar	1911	Calcutta	
95	An image of Raghunath Narasinha Mudholkar.	Raghunath Narasinha Mudholkar	1912	Bankipore	
96		Nawab Syed Muhammad Bahadur	1913	Karachi	
97		Bhupendra Nath Bose	1914	Madras	
98	An image of Satyendra Prasanno Sinha.	Satyendra Prasanno Sinha	1915	Bombay	
99	An image of Ambica Charan Mazumdar.	Ambica Charan Mazumdar	1915	Lucknow	

=== List of prime ministers of India ===
No.	Portrait	Name (birth and death)	Term of office		Party
No.	Portrait	Name (birth and death)	Took office	Left office	Party
100		Raja Mahendra Pratap (1 December 1886 – 29 April 1979)	1915	1919	Independent
101		Abdul Hafiz Mohamed Barakatullah (7 July 1854 – 20 September 1927)	1919	1919	Independent
102		Hari Singh Gour (26 November 1870 – 25 December 1949)	1919	1923	Independent
103		Motilal Nehru (6 May 1861 – 6 February 1931)	1923	1930	Independent
104		Jawaharlal Nehru (1889 –1964)	1930	1932	Independent
–		Hari Singh Gour (26 November 1870 – 25 December 1949)	1932	1934	Independent
105		Bhulabhai Desai (13 October 1877 – 6 May 1946)	1934	1936	Independent
106		Abul Kalam Azad ( 11 November 1888 – 22 February 1958)	1936	1943	Independent
107		Mahatma Gandhi (2 October 1869 – 30 January 1948)	1 July 1943	6 July 1943	Independent
108		Vallabhbhai Patel ( 31 October 1875 – 15 December 1950)	6 July 1943	6 July 1943	Independent
119		Muhammad Ali Jinnah (25 December 1876 – 11 September 1948)	6 July 1943	6 July 1943	Independent
110		Liaquat Ali Khan (1 October 1895 – 16 October 1951)	6 July 1943	6 July 1943	Independent
111		Subhash Chandra Bose (1897- 1945)	6 July 1943	18 August 1945	Indian National Army
112		Jawaharlal Nehru (1889- 1964)	18 August 1945	15 August 1947	Indian National Congress
-	After Independence (below)				
1	Jawaharlal Nehru	Jawaharlal Nehru (1889–1964)	15 August 1947	15 April 1952	Indian National Congress
1	Jawaharlal Nehru	Jawaharlal Nehru (1889–1964)	15 April 1952	17 April 1957	Indian National Congress
1	Jawaharlal Nehru	Jawaharlal Nehru (1889–1964)	17 April 1957	2 April 1962	Indian National Congress
1	Jawaharlal Nehru	Jawaharlal Nehru (1889–1964)	2 April 1962	27 May 1964†	Indian National Congress
Acting		Gulzarilal Nanda (1898–1998)	27 May 1964	9 June 1964	Indian National Congress
2		Lal Bahadur Shastri (1904–1966)	9 June 1964	11 January 1966†	Indian National Congress
–		Gulzarilal Nanda (1898–1998)	11 January 1966	24 January 1966	Indian National Congress
3		Indira Gandhi (1917–1984)	24 January 1966	4 March 1967	Indian National Congress
3		Indira Gandhi (1917–1984)	4 March 1967	15 March 1971	Indian National Congress
3		Indira Gandhi (1917–1984)	15 March 1971	24 March 1977	Indian National Congress
4		Morarji Desai (1896–1995)	24 March 1977	28 July 1979	Janata Party
Acting		Jagjivan Ram (1908–1986)	28 July 1979	28 July 1979	Janata Party
5		Charan Singh (1902–1987)	28 July 1979	8 January 1980^{[RES]}	Janata Party (Secular)
Acting		Yashwantrao Chavan (1913–1984)	8 January 1980	10 January 1980	Janata Party (Secular)
6		Charan Singh (1902–1987)	10 January 1980	14 January 1980	Janata Party (Secular)
7		Indira Gandhi (1917–1984)	14 January 1980^{[§]}	31 October 1984†	Indian National Congress (I)
8		Rajiv Gandhi (1944–1991)	31 October 1984	31 December 1984	Indian National Congress (I)
8		Rajiv Gandhi (1944–1991)	31 December 1984	2 December 1989	Indian National Congress (I)
9		Vishwanath Pratap Singh (1931–2008)	2 December 1989	10 November 1990^{[NC]}	Janata Dal (National Front)
Acting		Devi Lal (1915–2001)	10 November 1990	10 November 1990	Samajwadi Janata Party (Rashtriya)
10		Chandra Shekhar (1927–2007)	10 November 1990	21 June 1991^{[RES]}	Samajwadi Janata Party (Rashtriya)
11		P. V. Narasimha Rao (1921–2004)	21 June 1991	16 May 1996	Indian National Congress (I)
12		Atal Bihari Vajpayee (1924–2018)	16 May 1996	1 June 1996^{[RES]}	Bharatiya Janata Party
13		H. D. Deve Gowda (born 1933)	1 June 1996	21 April 1997^{[RES]}	Janata Dal (United Front)
14		Inder Kumar Gujral (1919–2012)	21 April 1997	19 March 1998^{[RES]}	Janata Dal (United Front)
15		Atal Bihari Vajpayee (1924–2018)	19 March 1998^{[§]}	13 October 1999^{[NC]}	Bharatiya Janata Party (NDA)
15		Atal Bihari Vajpayee (1924–2018)	13 October 1999	22 May 2002	Bharatiya Janata Party (NDA)
Acting		Lal Krishna Advani (1927–)	22 May 2002	22 May 2002	Bharatiya Janata Party (NDA)
16		Atal Bihari Vajpayee (1924–2018)	22 May 2002	22 May 2004	Bharatiya Janata Party (NDA)
Acting	An image of Sonia Gandhi.	Sonia Gandhi(1946 –)	22 May 2004	22 May 2004	Indian National Congress (UPA)
17		Manmohan Singh (1932- 2024)	22 May 2004	22 May 2009	Indian National Congress (UPA)
17		Manmohan Singh (1932- 2024)	22 May 2009	26 May 2014	Indian National Congress (UPA)
18		Narendra Modi (born 1950)	26 May 2014	30 May 2019	Bharatiya Janata Party (NDA)
18		Narendra Modi (born 1950)	30 May 2019 9 Jun 2024	9 Jun 2024 Incumbent	Bharatiya Janata Party (NDA)

== List of governors of Portuguese India ==
The following is a list of rulers during the history of Portuguese India as a viceroyalty or governorship.

Title	Name	Took office	Left office	Notes
Viceroy (nom.)	D. Tristão da Cunha	–	–	First to be nominated viceroy, but was unable to assume office
Viceroy	D. Francisco de Almeida	12 September 1505	November 1509	First governor and first viceroy of Portuguese India, appointed by King Manuel I of Portugal (r.1495–1521), conquered Kilwa, erected forts in Anjediva, Cochin, Cannanore, refused to cede office until after Battle of Diu, died at Table Bay, on return voyage, March 1510
Governor and Captain-General(*)	Afonso de Albuquerque	4 November 1509	September 1515	Appointment disputed and delayed by predecessor, conquered Goa, Malacca, Muscat and Hormuz, died off Goa, December 1515
Governor	Lopo Soares de Albergaria	8 September 1515	September 1518	Erected forts in Colombo (Ceylon) and Kollam, returned to Portugal
Governor	Diogo Lopes de Sequeira	8 September 1518	January 1522	Old explorer and former designated captain of Malacca (1509, aborted), erected forts in Chaul, Maldives and Pacem, sent embassies to Ethiopia, Pegu and China, returned to Portugal
Governor	D. Duarte de Menezes	22 January 1522	September 1524	Former captain of Tangier, grandson (via Tarouca line) of the famous Duarte de Menezes (Count of Viana), dismissed and returned to Portugal
Viceroy	D. Vasco da Gama	5 September 1524	December 1524	old discoverer of Indies route, now Count of Vidigueira, second Viceroy, first appointee of new King John III of Portugal (r.1521–1557), died at Cochin, December 1524
Governor	D. Henrique de Menezes (o Roxo)	17 January 1525	February 1526	succeeded in India by death of predecessor, died at Cannanore, February 1526
Governor	Lopo Vaz de Sampaio	February 1526	November 1529	succeeded in India by death of predecessor (third in line), refused to yield government to designated successor Pedro Mascarenhas, captain of Malacca), arrested, returned to Portugal as prisoner
Governor	Nuno da Cunha	18 November 1529	September 1538	son of Tristão da Cunha, arrival delayed by shipwreck in Madagascar, conquered northern province (Bassein, Bombay, Diu, Daman) died at sea on return to Portugal, March 1539
Viceroy	D. Garcia de Noronha	14 September 1538	April 1540	Third Viceroy, nephew of Afonso de Albuquerque, died in Cochin, April 1540
Governor	D. Estêvão da Gama	3 April 1540	May 1542	son of Vasco da Gama, captain of Portuguese Malacca (f.1538), succeeded in India by death of predecessor, returned to Portugal
Governor	Martim Afonso de Sousa	8 May 1542	1545	donatary-captain of São Vicente (Brazil, f. 1534), returned to Portugal
Governor	D. João de Castro	10 September 1545	1548	Nephew of D. Garcia de Noronha, promoted to Viceroy in early 1548
Viceroy	D. João de Castro	1548	June 1548	Fourth viceroy. Died at Goa, June 1548
Governor	Garcia de Sá	6 June 1548	June 1549	succeeded in India by death of predecessor, first governor married in India, acquired Bardez and Salcette, died at Goa, June 1549
Governor	Jorge Cabral	13 June 1549	November 1550	succeeded in India by death of predecessor, returned to Portugal
Viceroy	D. Afonso de Noronha	November 1550	September 1554	Fifth Viceroy (henceforth all Governors appointed in Lisbon will have rank of 'Viceroy'), former governor of Ceuta, 1540–49, son of Fernando de Menezes (Marquis of Vila Real), returned to Portugal
Viceroy	D. Pedro Mascarenhas	23 September 1554	June 1555	old discoverer of Indian Ocean islands, former captain of Malacca (1525–26), died at Goa, June 1555
Governor	Francisco Barreto	16 June 1555	September 1558	succeeded in India by death of predecessor, returned to Portugal. Later (1570) returned as governor of East Africa(**), led expedition to Monomatapa and died in Tete.
Viceroy	D. Constantino de Braganza	8 September 1558	September 1561	Son of James (Duke of Braganza), first appointee of Catherine of Austria, (regent of new King Sebastian of Portugal), returned to Portugal
Viceroy	D. Francisco Coutinho (Count of Redondo)	7 September 1561	19 February 1564	Died at Goa, February 1564
Governor	João de Mendonça	19 February 1564	September 1564	former captain of Malacca, succeeded in India by death of predecessor, returned to Portugal
Viceroy	D. António de Noronha (Antão)	3 September 1564	September 1568	former captain of Ceuta (1549), and Hormuz (c. 1560) nephew of earlier India governor D. Afonso de Noronha, died at sea on return to Portugal
Viceroy	D. Luís de Ataíde	10 September 1568	September 1571	future Count of Atouguia (f.1577), first appointee of King Sebastian of Portugal in his own right returned to Portugal
Viceroy(**)	D. António de Noronha (o Catarraz)	6 September 1571	December 1573	Not to be confused with earlier namesake, governor in Goa of a reduced India (**), co-equal with António Moniz Barreto (in Malacca) and Francisco Barreto (in Sofala), dismissed and returned to Portugal
Governor	António Moniz Barreto	9 December 1573	September 1576	Governor of Malacca, succeeded in India after dismissal of predecessor, returned to Portugal
Governor	D. Diogo de Menezes	September 1576	August 1578	Son of Tangier captain João de Menezes ("o Craveiro"); Succeeded in India after appointed viceroy, Rui Lourenço de Távora, died en route (off Mozambique), returned to Portugal.
Viceroy	D. Luís de Ataíde (second time)	31 August 1578	March 1581	Second appointment, now Count of Atouguia, already in India when news of the king's death at Alcazarquivir arrived, managed India through the early stages of 1580 succession crisis, died in Goa, March 1581
Governor	Fernão Teles de Menezes	March 1581	September 1581	Succeeded in India by death of predecessor (as per prior instructions of the late Cardinal-King Henry), considered the last governor of the House of Avis, received news of ascension of Habsburg king Philip I of Portugal, administered oaths of loyalty of Portuguese India colonies to new monarchy, returned to Portugal.
Viceroy	Francisco de Mascarenhas	1581	1584	Donatary-captain in the Azores; First appointee of Philip I of Portugal (r.1581–1598), returned to Portugal.
Viceroy	D. Duarte de Menezes	1584	4 May 1588	Former governor of Tangier (1474–78), Algarve (1580), grandson of earlier India governor Duarte de Menezes, Died in Goa, May 1588.
Governor	D. Manuel de Sousa Coutinho	May 1588	1591	Former governor of Ceylon, current governor of Malacca; Succeeded in India by death of predecessor, Died in shipwreck while returning to Portugal.
Viceroy	Matias de Albuquerque	1591	1597	
Viceroy	D. Francisco da Gama, conde da Vidigueira	1597	1600	
Viceroy	Aires de Saldanha	1600	1605	
Viceroy	Martim Afonso de Castro	1605	June 1607	Died at Malacca in June 1607
Governor	Fr. Aleixo de Meneses, Archbishop of Goa	June 1607	1609	
Governor	André Furtado de Mendonça	1609		
Viceroy	Rui Lourenço de Távora	1609	1612	
Viceroy	D. Jerónimo de Azevedo	1612	1617	
Viceroy	D. João Coutinho	1617	1619	
Governor	Fernão de Albuquerque	1619	1622	
Viceroy	D. Francisco da Gama (second time)	1622	1628	
Viceroy	Fr. Luís de Brito e Meneses, Bishop of Meliapore	1628	July 1629	Died at Cochim in July 1629
Governing Council	1. Nuno Álvares Botelho; 2. D. Lourenço da Cunha; 3. Gonçalo Pinto da Fonseca	1629		
Viceroy	Miguel de Noronha, conde de Linhares	1629	1635	
Viceroy	Pedro da Silva	1635	June 1639	Died at Goa in June 1639
Governor	António Teles de Meneses	1639	1640	
Viceroy	João da Silva Telo e Meneses, conde de Aveiras	1640	1644	Returned to Portugal
Viceroy	Filipe Mascarenhas	1644	1651	
Viceroy	João da Silva Telo e Meneses, conde de Aveiras (second time)	1651		Died at Mozambique, en route to India
Governing Council	1. Fr. Francisco dos Mártires (Archbp of Goa); 2. Francisco de Melo e Castro; 3. António de Sousa Coutinho	1651	1652	
Viceroy	Vasco Mascarenhas, 1st Count of Óbedos	1652	1655	Expelled in internal coup
Usurper	Brás de Castro	1655		Arrested by successor
Governor	Rodrigo Lobo da Silveira, Count of Sarzedas	23 Aug 1655	14 January 1656	Died at Goa in January 1656
Governor	Manuel Mascarenhas Homem	14 January 1656	22 May 1656	
Governing Council	1. Manuel Mascarenhas Homem; 2. Francisco de Melo e Castro; 3. António de Sousa Coutinho	January 1656	1661	
Governing Council	1. Luís de Mendonça Furtado e Albuquerque; 2. Manuel Mascarenhas Homem; 3. D. Pedro de Lencastre	1661		
Governing Council	1. Luís de Mendonça Furtado e Albuquerque, 2. António de Melo e Castro; 3. D. Pedro de Lencastre	1661	1662	
Viceroy	António de Melo e Castro	16 December 1662	1666	
Viceroy	João Nunes da Cunha, Count of São Vicente	1666	November 1668	Died at Goa in November 1668
Governing Council	1. António de Melo e Castro, 2. Manuel Corte-Real de Sampaio; 3. Luís de Miranda Henriques	November 1668	1671	
Viceroy	Luís de Mendonça Furtado e Albuquerque	1671	1676	Died off Lisbon on return voyage
Viceroy	D. Pedro de Almeida, Conde de Assumar	1676	1678	Died at Goa in 1678
Interim Governor	António Brandão, Archbishop of Goa (sometime with António Pais de Sande)	1678	1681	
Viceroy	Francisco de Távora, conde de Alvor	1681	1686	
Governor	D. Rodrigo da Costa	1686	1690	
Governor	D. Miguel de Almeida	1690	January 1691	Died at Goa in January 1691
Governing Council	1. Fernando Martins Mascarenhas Lencastre; 2. Fr. Agostinho da Anunciação (Archbp of Goa)	January 1691	1692	
Viceroy	Pedro António de Meneses Noronha de Albuquerque	1692	1697	Returned to Portugal
Viceroy	António Luís Gonçalves da Câmara Coutinho	1697	1701	
Governing Council	1. Fr. Agostinho da Anunciação (Archp of Goa); 2. D. Vasco Lima Coutinho	1701	1702	
Viceroy	Caetano de Melo e Castro	1702	1707	
Viceroy	D. Rodrigo da Costa (second time, as Viceroy now)	1707	1712	
Viceroy	Vasco Fernandes César de Meneses, Count of Sabugosa	1712	1717	Returned to Portugal
Governor	Fr. Sebastião de Andrade Pessanha, Archbishop of Goa	January 1717	October 1717	
Viceroy	Luís Carlos Inácio Xavier de Meneses, 5th Count of Ericeira	October 1717	1720	
Viceroy	Francisco José de Sampaio e Castro	1720	July 1723	Died at Goa in July 1723
Interim Governor	Cristóvão de Melo	July 1723		
Governing Council	1. Cristóvão de Melo; 2. Fr. Inácio de Santa Teresa (Archbp of Goa); 3. Cristóvão Luís de Andrade	1723	1725	
Viceroy	João de Saldanha da Gama	1725	1732	Returned to Portugal
Governing Council	1. Cristóvão de Melo; 2. Fr. Inácio de Santa Teresa (Archbp of Goa); 3. Tomé Gomes Moreira	1732		
Viceroy	Pedro Mascarenhas, 1st Count of Sandomil	1732	1740	Returned to Portugal
Viceroy	Luís Carlos Inácio Xavier de Meneses, 1st Marquis of Louriçal (second time)	1740	1742	Died at Goa in 1742
Governing Council	1. Francisco de Vasconcelos; 2. Lourenço de Noronha; 3. Luís Caetano de Almeida	1742	1744	
Viceroy	Pedro Miguel de Almeida Portugal e Vasconcelos, Count of Assumar, marquis of Alorna	1744	1750	
Viceroy	Francisco de Assis de Távora, marquis of Távora	September 1750	1754	Returned to Portugal, executed in 1759
Viceroy	Luís Mascarenhas, Count of Alva	1754	June 1756	Killed in action by the Maratha Army at Goa in June 1756
Governing Council	1. António Taveira da Neiva Brum da Silveira; (Archbp of Goa); 2. João de Mesquista Matos Teixeira; 3. Filipe de Valadares	1756	1757	
Viceroy	Manuel de Saldanha e Albuquerque, Count of Ega	1758	1765	Returned to Portugal
Council	1. António Taveira da Neiva Brum da Silveira; (Archbp of Goa); 2. João Baptista Vaz Pereira; 3. D. João José de Melo	1765	1768	
Governor	João José de Melo	1768	1771	Promoted to Captain-General in 1771 (***)
Governor and Captain-General	João José de Melo	1771	January 1774	Died at Goa in January 1774
Interim Governor	Filipe de Valadares Sotomaior	1774		
Governor and Captain-General of India	D. José Pedro da Câmara	1774	1779	
Governor and Captain-General of India	D. Frederico Guilherme de Sousa Holstein	1779	1786	
Governor and Captain-General of India	Francisco da Cunha e Meneses	1786	1794	
Governor and Captain-General of India	Francisco António da Veiga Cabral da Câmara, Viscount of Mirandela	1794	1806	
Viceroy and Captain-General of India	D. Bernardo José Maria da Silveira e Lorena, Count of Sarzedas	1806	1816	
Viceroy and Captain-General of India	D. Diogo de Sousa, Count of Rio Pardo	1816	1821	
Provisional Junta of Government of the State of India	Manuel José Gomes Loureiro, Manuel Godinho Mira, Joaquim Manuel Correia da Silva e Gama, Gonçalo de Magalhães Teixeira Pinto; Manuel Duarte Leitão	1821		
Provisional Junta of Government of the State of India	D. Manuel da Câmara, D. Frei de São Tomás de Aquino, António José de Melo Sotomaior Teles, João Carlos Leal; António José de Lima Leitão	1821	1822	
Provisional Junta of Government of the State of India	D. Manuel da Câmara, D. Frei de São Tomás de Aquino, António José de Melo Sotomaior Teles, João Carlos Leal, Joaquim Mourão Garcez Palha	1822	1823	
Viceroy and Captain-General of India	D. Manuel da Câmara	1823	1825	Dissolved Junta and assumed de facto title of Governor of Portuguese India
Government Council of the State of India	D. Frei Manuel de São Galdino, Cândido José Mourão Garcez Palha, António Ribeiro de Carvalho	1825	1826	
Governor and Captain-General of India	D. Manuel Francisco Zacarias de Portugal e Castro	1826	1830	
Viceroy and Captain-General of India	D. Manuel Francisco Zacarias de Portugal e Castro	1826	1835	
Governor	Bernardo Peres da Silva	1835		
Governor	D. Manuel Francisco Zacarias de Portugal e Castro	1835		
Governor	Joaquim Manuel Correia da Silva e Gama	1835		
Government Council of the State of India	João Casimiro Pereira da Rocha de Vasconcelos, Manuel José Ribeiro, Frei Constantino de Santa Rita, João Cabral de Estefique, António Maria de Melo, Joaquim António de Morais Carneiro, António Mariano de Azevedo, José António de Lemos	1835	1837	After 1836 confined to Goa
Governor	Bernardo Peres da Silva	1836	1837	Governor of Daman and Diu, provisional governor of Goa
Governor	Simão Infante de Lacerda de Sousa Tavares, Baron of Sabroso	1837	1839	(restored unity to Portuguese India)
Governor	José António Vieira da Fonseca	1839		
Governor	Manuel José Mendes, Baron of Candal	1839	1840	
Government Council of the State of India	José António Vieira da Fonseca, José Câncio Freire de Lima, António João de Ataíde, Domingos José Mariano Luís, José da Costa Campos, Caetano de Sousa e Vasconcelos	1840		
Interim Governor	José Joaquim Lopes Lima	1840	1842	
Government Council of the State of India	António Ramalho de Sá, António José de Melo Sotomaior Teles, António João de Ataíde, José da Costa Campos; Caetano de Sousa e Vasconcelos	1842		
Governor	Francisco Xavier da Silva Pereira, Count of Antas	1842	1843	
Governor	Joaquim Mourão Garcez Palha	1843	1844	
Governor	José Ferreira Pestana	1844	1851	
Governor	José Joaquim Januário Lapa, Viscount of Vila Nova de Ourém	1851	1855	
Government Council of the State of India	D. Frei Joaquim de Santa Rita Botelho, Arcebispo de Goa e Primaz das Índias, Luís da Costa Campos, Francisco Xavier Peres, Bernardo Heitor da Silva e Lorena, Vítor Anastácio Mourão Garcez Palha	1855		
Governor	António César de Vasconcelos Correia, Count of Torres Novas	1855	1864	
Governor	José Ferreira Pestana	1864	1870	2nd term
Governor	Januário Correia de Almeida, Count of São Januário	1870	1871	
Governor	Joaquim José Macedo e Couto	1871	1875	
Governor	João Tavares de Almeida	1875	1877	
Government Council of the State of India	D. Aires de Ornelas e Vasconcelos, Archbishop of Goa and Primate of the Indies, João Caetano da Silva Campos, Francisco Xavier Soares da Veiga; Eduardo Augusto de Sá Nogueira Pinto Balsemão	1877		
Governor	António Sérgio de Sousa	1877	1878	
Government Council of the State of India	D. Aires de Ornelas e Vasconcelos, Archbishop of Goa and Primate of the Indies, João Caetano da Silva Campos, Francisco Xavier Soares da Veiga; António Sérgio de Sousa Júnior	1878		
Governor	Caetano Alexandre de Almeida e Albuquerque	1878	1882	
Governor	Carlos Eugénio Correia da Silva, Viscount of Paço d'Arcos	1882	1886	
Government Council of the State of India	D. António Sebastião Valente, Archbishop of Goa and Patriarch of the East Indies, José de Sá Coutinho, José Inácio de Brito; José Maria Teixeira Guimarães	1886		
Governor	Francisco Joaquim Ferreira do Amaral	1886		
Government Council of the State of India	D. António Sebastião Valente, Archbishop of Goa and Patriarch of the East Indies, José de Sá Coutinho, José Inácio de Brito; José Maria Teixeira Guimarães	1886		
Governor	Augusto César Cardoso de Carvalho	1886	1889	
Interim Governor	Joaquim Augusto Mouzinho de Albuquerque	1889		
Government Council of the State of India	D. António Sebastião Valente, Archbishop of Goa and Patriarch of the East Indies, Joaquim Borges de Azevedo Enes, José Inácio de Brito, Joaquim Augusto Mouzinho de Albuquerque	1889		
Governor	Vasco Guedes de Carvalho e Meneses	1889	1891	
Governor	Francisco Maria da Cunha	1891		
Interim Governor	João Manuel Correia Taborda	1891	1892	1st term
Government Council of the State of India	D. António Sebastião Valente, Archbishop of Goa and Patriarch of the East Indies, Luís Fisher Berquó Falcão, Raimundo Maria Correia Mendes, João Manuel Correia Taborda	1892		
Governor	Francisco Teixeira da Silva	1892	1893	
Government Council of the State of India	Luís Poças Falcão, Raimundo Maria Correia Mendes, João Manuel Correia Taborda	1893		
Governor	Rafael Jácome de Andrade	1893	1894	1st term
Interim Governor	João Manuel Correia Taborda	1894		2nd term
Government Council of the State of India	D. António Sebastião Valente, Archbishop of Goa and Patriarch of the East Indies, Francisco António Ochoa, Luís Carneiro de Sousa e Faro, João Manuel Correia Taborda	1894		
Governor	Elesbão José de Bettencourt Lapa, Viscount of Vila Nova de Ourém	1894	1895	
Governor	Rafael Jácome de Andrade	1895	1896	2nd term
Viceroy	Prince D. Afonso Henriques de Bragança, Duke of Porto	1896		
Interim Governor	João António de Brissac das Neves Ferreira	1896	1897	
Interim Governor	João Manuel Correia Taborda	1897		3rd term
Government Council of the State of India	D. António Sebastião Valente, Archbishop of Goa and Patriarch of the East Indies, Francisco António Ochoa, João de Melo Sampaio, João Manuel Correia Taborda	1897		
Government Council of the State of India	D. António Sebastião Valente, Archbishop of Goa and Patriarch of the East Indies, Abel Augusto Correia do Pinto, João de Melo Sampaio, João Manuel Correia Taborda	1897		
Governor	Joaquim José Machado	1897	1900	
Governor	Eduardo Augusto Rodrigues Galhardo	1900	1905	
Government Council of the State of India	D. António Sebastião Valente, Archbishop of Goa and Patriarch of the East Indies, Alfredo Mendonça David, José Emílio Santana da Cunha Castel-Branco, Francisco Maria Peixoto Vieira	1905		
Governor	Arnaldo de Novais Guedes Rebelo	1905	1907	
Government Council of the State of India	Bernardo Nunes Garcia, César Augusto Rancon, Francisco Maria Peixoto Vieira	1907		
Governor	José Maria de Sousa Horta e Costa	1907	1910	
Governor-General	Francisco Manuel Couceiro da Costa	1910	1917	
Interim Governor-General	Francisco Maria Peixoto Vieira	1917		1st term
Government Council of the State of India	Francisco Peixoto de Oliveira e Silva, Francisco Wolfgango da Silva, Francisco Maria Peixoto Vieira	1917		
Governor-General	José de Freitas Ribeiro	1917	1919	
Interim Governor-General	Augusto de Paiva Bobela da Mota	1919	1920	
Governador-General	Jaime Alberto de Castro Morais	1920	1925	
Interim Governor-General	Francisco Maria Peixoto Vieira	1925		2nd term
Governor-General	Mariano Martins	1925	1926	
Interim Governor-General	Tito Augusto de Morais	1926		
Interim Governor-General	Acúrcio Mendes da Rocha Dinis	1926	1927	
Governor-General	Pedro Francisco Massano de Amorim	1927	1929	
Interim Governor-General	Acúrcio Mendes da Rocha Dinis	1929		
Governor-General	Alfredo Pedro de Almeida	1929	1930	
Governor-General	João Carlos Craveiro Lopes	1930	1936	
Interim Governor-General	Francisco Craveiro Lopes	1936	1938	
Governor-General	José Ricardo Pereira Cabral	1938	1945	
Interim Governor-General	Paulo Bénard Guedes	1945	1946	
Governor-General	José Ferreira Bossa	1946	1947	
Interim Governor-General	José Alves Ferreira	1947	1948	
Governor-General	Fernando de Quintanilha e Mendonça Dias	1948	1952	
Governor-General	Paulo Bénard Guedes	1952	1958	
Governor-General	Manuel António Vassalo e Silva	1958	1961	

(*) – In 1508, King Manuel I of Portugal devised a plan to partition the Portuguese empire in Asia into three separate governments or "high captaincies" – (1) Captain-Major of the seas of Ethiopia, Arabia and Persia, centered at Socotra, was to cover the East African and Arabian-Persian coasts, from Sofala to Diu; (2) Captain-Major of the seas of India, centered at Cochin, was to cover the Indian coast from Diu down to Cape Comorin. Afonso de Albuquerque was Captain-General of the latter. Jorge de Aguiar was made Captain-General of the former. A third high captaincy, covering Asia east of Cape Comorin (yet to be explored) was assigned to Diogo Lopes de Sequeira, who was assigned that year to discover Malacca. The triarchy experiment failed – Aguiar drowned en route, while Sequeira quit the region in 1509, after his debacle at Malacca, leaving Albuquerque sole governor of the whole unpartitioned complex.

(**) – Around 1570, King Sebastian of Portugal tried to partition the Portuguese State of India into three separate governments (much like Manuel's plan of 1508) – a western state based around Sofala (covering the East African coast from Cape Correntes to Cape Guardafui), a central state ruled from Goa (covering the area between the Red Sea and Ceylon, encompassing India, reserved for the "Viceroy") and an eastern state ruled from Malacca (covering Southeast Asia, from Pegu to China). D. António de Noronha was appointed to Goa, António Moniz Barreto to Malacca, and Francisco Barreto (the former India governor) to Sofala.

(***) – Title of Viceroy of Indies extinguished by royal letter in 1771, replaced by Capitão-Geral (Captain-General) of the Indies.

== List of chief governing officers ==
=== Commissioners ===
- François Caron, 1668–1672
- François Baron, 1672–1681
- François Martin, 1681 – November 1693
- Dutch occupation, September 1693 – September 1699 — Treaty of Ryswick (1697)

=== Governors ===
In the days of the French East India Company, the title of the top official was most of the time Governor of Pondicherry and General Commander of the French settlements in the East Indies (French: Gouverneur de Pondichéry et commandant général des établissements français aux Indes orientales). After 1816, it was Governor of French establishments in India (French: Gouverneur des établissements français de l'Inde').

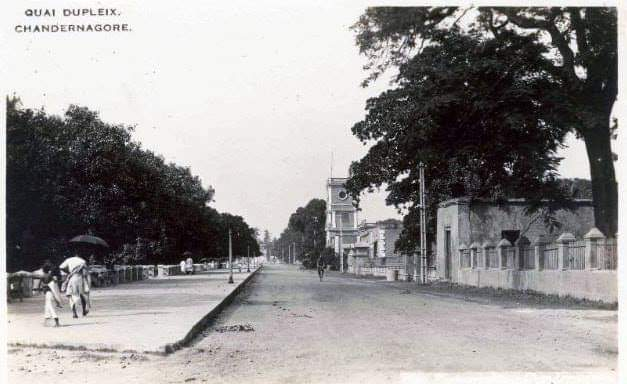
Quai Dupleix at Strand Road Chandernagor

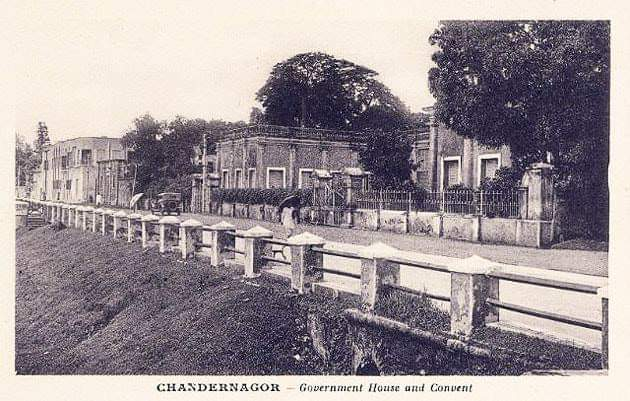
Chandernagore Government House and Convent

- François Martin, September 1699 – 31 December 1706
- Pierre Dulivier (Acting), January 1707 – July 1708
- Guillaume André d'Hébert, 1708–1712
- Pierre Dulivier, 1713–1715
- Guillaume André d'Hébert, 1715–1718
- Pierre André Prévost de La Prévostière, August 1718 – 11 October 1721
- Pierre Christoph Le Noir (Acting), 1721–1723
- Joseph Beauvollier de Courchant, 1723–1726
- Pierre Christoph Le Noir, 1727–1734
- Pierre Benoît Dumas, 1735–1741
- Joseph François Dupleix, 14 January 1742 – 15 October 1754
- Charles Godeheu, Le commissaire (Acting), 15 October 1754 – 1754
- Georges Duval de Leyrit, 1756–1758
- Thomas Arthur, comte de Lally, 1758 – January 1761
- First British occupation, January 15, 1761 – June 25, 1765 — Treaty of Paris (1763)
- Jean Law de Lauriston, 1765–1766
- Antoine Boyellau (Acting), 1766–1767
- Jean Law de Lauriston, 1767 – January 1777
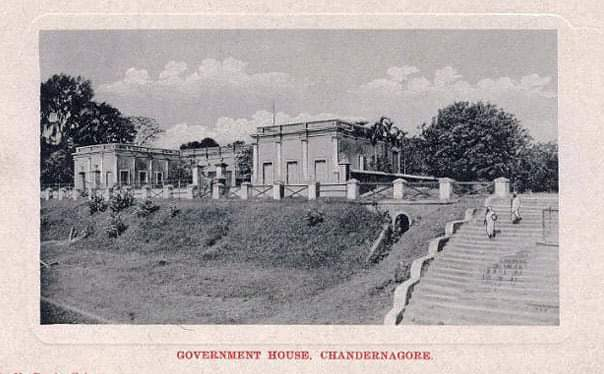
  Chandernagor Government House
- Second British occupation, 1778 – 1783 – Treaty of Paris (1783)
- Guillaume de Bellecombe, January 1777 – 1778
- Marquis de Bussy-Castelnau, 1783–1785
- François de Souillac, 1785
- David Charpentier de Cossigny, October 1785 – 1787
- Thomas Conway, October 1787 – 1789
- Camille Charles Leclerc, Chevalier de Fresne, 1789–1792
- Dominique Prosper de Chermont, November 1792 – 1793
- L. Leroux de Touffreville, 1793
- Third British occupation, 23 August 1793 – 18 June 1802 — Treaty of Amiens (1802)
- Charles Mathieu Isidore Decaen, 18 June 1802 – August 1803
- Louis Binot, 1803
- Fourth British occupation, August 1803 – 26 September 1816 — Treaty of Paris (1814)
- Comte Dupuy, 26 September 1816 – October 1825
- Joseph Cordier, Marie Emmanuel (Acting), October 1825 – 19 June 1826
- Eugène Desbassayns de Richemont, 1826 – 2 August 1828
- Joseph Cordier, Marie Emmanuel (Acting), 2 August 1828 – 11 April 1829
- Auguste Jacques Nicolas Peureux de Mélay, 11 April 1829 – 3 May 1835
- Hubert Jean Victor, Marquis de Saint-Simon, 3 May 1835 – April 1840
- Paul de Nourquer du Camper, April 1840 – 1844
- Louis Pujol, 1844–1849
- Hyacinthe Marie de Lalande de Calan, 1849–1850
- Philippe Achille Bédier, 1851–1852
- Raymond de Saint-Maur, August 1852 – April 1857
- Alexandre Durand d'Ubraye, April 1857 – January 1863
- Napoléon Joseph Louis Bontemps, January 1863 – June 1871
- Antoine-Léonce Michaux, June 1871 – November 1871
- Pierre Aristide Faron, November 1871 – 1875
- Adolph Joseph Antoine Trillard, 1875–1878
- Léonce Laugier, February 1879 – April 1881
- Théodore Drouhet, 1881 – October 1884
- Étienne Richaud, October 1884 – 1886
- Édouard Manès, 1886–1888
- Georges Jules Piquet, 1888–1889
- Louis Hippolyte Marie Nouet, 1889–1891
- Léon Émile Clément-Thomas, 1891–1896
- Louis Jean Girod, 1896 – February 1898
- François Pierre Rodier, February 1898 – 11 January 1902
- Louis Pelletan (Acting), 11 January 1902
- Victor Louis Marie Lanrezac, 1902–1904
- Philema Lemaire, August 1904 – April 1905
- Joseph Pascal François, April 1905 – October 1906
- Gabriel Louis Angoulvant, October 1906 – 3 December 1907
- Adrien Jules Jean Bonhoure, 1908–1909
- Ernest Fernand Lévecque, 1909 – 9 July 1910
- Alfred Albert Martineau, 9 July 1910 – July 1911
- Pierre Louis Alfred Duprat, July 1911 – November 1913
- Alfred Albert Martineau, November 1913 – 29 June 1918
- Pierre Étienne Clayssen (Acting), 29 June 1918 – 21 February 1919
- Louis Martial Innocent Gerbinis, 21 February 1919 – 11 February 1926
- Henri Léo Eugène Lagroua (Acting), 11 February 1926 – 5 August 1926
- Pierre Jean Henri Didelot, 1926–1928
- Robert Paul Marie de Guise, 1928–1931
- Adrien Juvanon, 1931–1934
- Léon Solomiac, August 1934 – 1936
- Horace Valentin Crocicchia, 1936–1938
- Louis Bonvin, 26 September 1938 – 1945
- Nicolas Ernest Marie Maurice Jeandin, 1945–1946
- Charles François Marie Baron, 20 March 1946 – 20 August 1947

French India became an Overseas territory (French: territoire d'outre-mer) of France in 1946.

=== Commissioners ===
- Charles François Marie Baron, 20 August 1947 – May 1949
- Charles Chambon, May 1949 – 31 July 1950
- André Ménard, 31 July 1950 – October 1954
- Georges Escargueil, October 1954 – 1 November 1954

French India de facto transferred to the Republic of India in 1954.

=== High Commissioners ===
The first High Commissioner, Kewal Singh was appointed immediately after the Kizhoor referendum on 21 October 1954 as per Foreign Jurisdiction Act, 1947. The Chief Commissioner had the powers of the former French commissioner, but was under the direct control of the Union Government.

The list of Chief Commissioners is given below

No.	Name	Took office	Left office
1	Kewal Singh	21 October 1954	16 November 1956
2	M.K. Kripalani	17 November 1956	27 August 1958
3	Lal Ram Saran Singh	30 August 1958	8 February 1961
4	Sisir Kumar Dutta	2 May 1961	1 August 1963
5	K.J. Somasundaram	2 August 1963	13 October 1963

== East India Company ==
East India Company is a general term, referring to a number of European trading companies established in the early modern era to establish trade relations with and subsequently political control over the Indian subcontinent, the Indonesian archipelago and the neighbouring lands in Southeast Asia. They would include:

- British East India Company (1600–1874)
- Dutch East India Company (1602–1799)
- Danish East India Company (1616–1650), re-established 1670–1729
- Portuguese East India Company (1628–1633)
- Genoese East India Company (1649–1650)
- French East India Company (1664–1769), re-established 1785–1794
- Swedish East India Company (1731–1813)
- Austrian East India Company (1776–1781)

== British East India Company ==
- British East India Company (1600–1874)

=== Early governors ===
- 1600–1601: Sir Thomas Smythe (first governor)
- 1601–1602: Sir John Watts
- 1602–1603: Sir John Hart
- 1603–1606: Sir Thomas Smythe (re-elected)
- 1606–1607: Sir William Romney
- 1607–1621: Sir Thomas Smythe (re-elected)
- 1621–1624: Sir William Halliday
- 1624–1638: Sir Maurice (Morris) Abbot
- 1638–1641: Sir Christopher Clitherow

== Evolution of flags ==
=== Indian polities ===
Flag	Duration	Use	Description
	1320–1413	Flag of the Tughlaq dynasty of the Delhi Sultanate according to the Catalan Atlas, but there is no evidence this was actually used by the Delhi Sultanate.	A gray flag with a black strip left of center.
	1490–1636	Flag of the Ahmadnagar Sultanate	A dark green triangular swallowtailed field.
	1518–1687	Flag of the Golconda Sultanate	A turquoise field.
	1526–1858	Flag of the Mughal Empire (Alam)	A flag that was primarily moss green.
	1674–1818	Flag of the Maratha Empire (Bhagwa Dhwaj)	A saffron colored swallowtail flag.
	1716–1799	Flag of The Sikh Confederacy	Flag of the Nihang Khalsa Fauj showing weapons like Katar (dagger), Dhal Shield and Kirpan. The standard goes from 'bottom to top' signifying that the armies of the tenth guru are always victorious.
	1799–1849	Flag of the Sikh Empire (Nishan Sahib)	A triangular flag that was saffron with a green border.

=== Colonial India ===
==== British rule in India ====
Flag	Duration	Use	Description
	1880–1947	Civil Ensign of India used to represent India internationally.	A Red Ensign with the Union Jack at the canton, defaced with the Star of India emblem displayed in the fly.
	1885–1947	Flag of the Viceroy and Governor-General of India	The Union Jack defaced with the insignia of the Order of the Star of India beneath the Tudor Crown.
	1858–1947	The official state flag of the British Empire used in India	The Flag of the United Kingdom.
	1801–1858	Flag of the East India Company	A striped banner with the Union Jack in the canton.
	1707–1801	Flag of the East India Company	A striped banner with the Union Jack of Great Britain in the canton.
	1600–1707	Flag of the East India Company	A striped banner with Saint George's Cross in the canton.

==== French India ====
Flag	Date	Use	Description
	1667–1791	Flag of the Kingdom of France	Flag of the Kingdom of France.
	1791–1794	1791–1792: Flag of the Kingdom of France; 1792–1794: Flag of the French First Republic	The flag of France.
	1814–1815; 1815–1830	Flag of the Kingdom of France under the Bourbon Restoration	Flag of the Kingdom of France.
	1794–1804, 1830–1940, 1944–1954	1794–1804: Flag of the French First Republic; 1804–1814, 1815: Flag of the First French Empire; 1830–1848; Flag of the Kingdom of France; 1848–1852: Flag of the French Second Republic; 1852–1870: Flag of the Second French Empire; 1870–1940: Flag of the French Third Republic and French Empire; 1944–1946: Flag of the Provisional Government of the Fourth French Republic; 1946–1954: Flag of the French Fourth Republic and French Union	The flag of France.
	1940–1944	Flag of French India under Free France	Flag of Free France with the Cross of Lorraine

==== Portuguese India ====
Flag	Date	Use	Description
	1497–1521	Flag of the Kingdom of Portugal.	
	1578–1616	Flag of the Kingdom of Portugal.	
	1616–1640	Flag of the Kingdom of Portugal.	
	1640–1667	Flag of the Kingdom of Portugal.	
	17th and 18th centuries	Portuguese Indian Naval Ensign.	
	1667–1706	Flag of the Kingdom of Portugal.	
	18th century	Portuguese Indian Merchant Ensign	
	1706–1750	Flag of the Kingdom of Portugal.	
	1816–1826	Flag of the United Kingdom of Portugal, Brazil and the Algarves.	
	1826–1830	Flag of the Kingdom of Portugal.	
	1830–1910	Flag of the Kingdom of Portugal.	Vertical bicolour blue-white. Proportion of the fields: 1:1.
	1910–1961 (de facto); 1910–1974 (de jure)	Flag of the Portuguese Republic. The final state flag of Portuguese India.	Used from the implantation of the Portuguese Republic in 1910. Officially used until 1974, as Portugal only then recognised the Annexation of Portuguese India.
	1967 (proposed)	Proposed official flag for Portuguese India in 1967.	Proposal by F. P. de Almeida Langhans. Never actually used.
	1935–1961	Distinctive Flag of a Portuguese Overseas Governor-General (used by the Governor-General of Portuguese India)	

==== Dutch India ====
Flag	Date	Use	Description
	1605–1795	The Prince's Flag	
	1652–1795	States Flag	
	1795–1806	Flag of the Batavian Republic	
	1813–1825	Flag of Sovereign Principality of the United Netherlands and the United Kingdom of the Netherlands	

=== Danish India ===
Flag	Date	Use	Description
	1620–1869	The flag of Denmark (Denmark-Norway until 1814)	

=== Swedish India ===
Flag	Date	Use	Description
	1731–1813	The flag of Sweden	

==== Austrian India ====
Flag	Date	Use	Description
	1778–1785	The flag of Archduchy of Austria	

== Flags used in the Indian independence movement ==
Flag	Date	Use	Description
	1906	Calcutta flag	Three horizontal bands of equal width with the top being orange, the centre yellow, and the bottom green. It had eight half-opened lotus flowers on the top stripe, and a picture of the sun and a crescent moon on the bottom stripe. वन्दे मातरम् (Vande Mātaram) was inscribed in the centre in Devanagari. The partition of Bengal (1905) resulted in the introduction of a new Indian flag that sought to unite the multitude of castes and races within the country. The Vande Mataram flag, part of the Swadeshi movement against the British, comprised Indian religious symbols represented in western heraldic fashion. The tricolour flag included eight white lotuses on the upper green band representing the eight provinces, a sun and a crescent on the bottom red band, and the Vande Mataram slogan in Hindi on the central yellow band. The flag was launched in Calcutta bereft of any ceremony and the launch was only briefly covered by newspapers. The flag was not covered in contemporary governmental or political reports either, but was used at the annual session of the Indian National Congress. A slightly modified version was subsequently used by Madam Bhikaji Cama at the Second Socialist International Meeting in Stuttgart. Despite the multiple uses of the flag, it failed to generate enthusiasm amongst Indian nationalists.
	1907	Early Indian nationalist flags (Note: Around the same time, another proposal for the flag was initiated by Sister Nivedita, a Hindu reformist and disciple of Swami Vivekananda. The flag consisted of a thunderbolt in the centre and a hundred and eight oil lamps for the border, with the Vande Mataram caption split around the thunderbolt. It was also presented at the Indian National Congress meeting in 1906. Soon, many other proposals were initiated, but none of them gained attention from the nationalist movement.)	
	1917	Flag of the Home Rule Movement (Note: In 1916, Suraiya Tayyabji submitted thirty new designs, in the form of a booklet funded by members of the High Court of Madras. These many proposals and recommendations did little more than keep the flag movement alive. The same year, Annie Besant and Bal Gangadhar Tilak adopted a new flag as part of the Home Rule Movement. The flag included the Union Jack in the upper left corner, a star and crescent in the upper right, and seven stars displayed diagonally from the lower right, on a background of five red and four green alternating bands. The flag resulted in the first governmental initiative against any nationalistic flag, as a magistrate in Coimbatore banned its use. The ban was followed by a public debate on the function and importance of a national flag.)	Five red and four green horizontal stripes On the upper left quadrant was the Union Jack, which signified the Dominion status that the movement sought to achieve. A crescent and a star, both in white, are set in top fly. Seven white stars are arranged as in the Saptarishi constellation (the constellation Ursa Major), which is sacred to Hindus.
	1931–1947	The Swaraj Flag, officially adopted by the Indian National Congress in 1931. In the years 1943–1945 it was the official flag of the Azad Hind Imperial Japanese puppet government for India and the Indian National Army	
	1942–1945	Flag of the Indian Legion of the Waffen-SS of Nazi Germany	Three horizontal strips of saffron, white, and green, with a springing tiger in the centre.

=== Proposed flags ===
Flag	Date	Use	Description
	1902	Design reported in the Daily Express to have been proposed as part of a series of Empire flags that would replace the Union Jack in representing individual territories of the British Empire	The Cross of Saint George and the crown in the canton would have been present on all Empire flags to represent the English. In the top right would have been the emblem of the territory flying the flag, and in this case, the Star of India. A large sun in the centre symbolizes "the empire on which the sun never sets."
	Proposed in 1904, used in April 1910	Flag proposed in an issue of an Anglo-Indian weekly.	Dark blue, green and light blue triband with a purple band at the hoist depicting the Orion constellation. A thin red border surrounds the whole flag.
	1921	Mahatma Gandhi's Original Proposal	
	1921	Gandhi's flag, introduced at the Indian National Congress meeting in 1921	
	1932	Proposed flag for Portuguese India, designed by Afonso de Ornelas.	
	1947	Louis Mountbatten's proposed flag for India.	The Swaraj flag with a small Union Flag in the canton.
	1965	Proposed official flag for Portuguese India in 1965. The proposal came after the annexation of the territories in 1961 and was part of a series of similar flags for the other colonies.	Proposal by F. P. de Almeida Langhans. Never actually used.

=== Dominion of India ===
Flag	Date	Use	Description
	1947–1950	Flag of the Dominion of India	A horizontal tricolour of saffron at the top, white in the middle, and green at the bottom. In the centre is a navy blue wheel with twenty-four spokes, known as the Ashoka Chakra.
	1947–1950	Flag of the governor-general of India	Dark blue field emblazoned with the royal crest (a Tudor Crown surmounted by the lion of England, itself wearing the crown), beneath which was the word 'India' in gold majuscules. Similar to flags used by other Governors-General of Commonwealth realms.
	1947–present	National flag of India	A horizontal tricolour of saffron at the top, white in the middle, and green at the bottom. In the centre is a navy blue wheel with twenty-four spokes, known as the Ashoka Chakra.

== List of European colonies in Asia ==
Dutch, British, Spanish, Portuguese colonies and Russian territories in Asia: British colonies in East Asia, South Asia, and Southeast Asia:

=== British Empire ===
- (British Empire)
- (British rule in Burma) British Burma (1824–1948, merged with India by the British from 1886 to 1937)
- British Ceylon (1815–1948, now Sri Lanka)
- (British Raj) Colonial India (includes the territory of present-day India, Pakistan and Bangladesh)

=== British India ===
- (British protectorate)
British India (1613–1947)

British East India Company (1757–1858)
British Raj (1858–1947)

- Bhutan (1865–1947) (British protectorate)
- Nepal (1816–1923) (British protectorate)

=== Danish India ===
Danish India (1696–1869)

=== Sweden ===
(Sweden) Swedish Parangipettai (1733)

=== French colonies in South and Southeast Asia ===
- French India (1769–1954)

=== Dutch India ===
- Dutch India (1605–1825)
- Dutch Bengal
- Dutch Ceylon (1656–1796)

=== Portuguese ===
- (Portuguese Empire)
- Portuguese Ceylon (1505–1658)
- Portuguese India (1510–1961)

=== Russian Empire ===
- Outer Manchuria – ceded to Russian Empire through Treaty of Aigun (1858) and Treaty of Peking (1860)

=== Spanish Empire ===
(Spanish Empire) Spanish Philippines (1565–1898, 3rd longest European occupation in Asia, 333 years),

== India's protectorates ==
- Bhutan (1947–1971).
- Kingdom of Sikkim (1950–1975), later acceded to India as State of Sikkim.

== Provisional Government to Indian independence ==
No.	Name (birth–death)	Photograph	Elected	Took office	Left office	Vice President	Party
Provisional Government of India
1	Mahendra Pratap		—	1915	1919	Abdul Hafiz Mohamed Barakatullah	
2	Abdul Hafiz Mohamed Barakatullah		—	1919	1919	Mahendra Pratap	

=== Subhas Chandra Bose Provisional Government to Indian independence ===
No.	Name (birth–death)	Photograph	Elected	Took office	Left office	Vice President	Party
Provisional Government of India
1	Subhas Chandra Bose		—	1941	1945	Mohan Singh and Iwaichi Fujiwara founders of the First Indian National Army	

=== President of the Executive Council ===
Interim Government of India

No.	Portrait	Name	Term of office		Political party
1		Jawaharlal Nehru Vice-President of the Executive Council; External Affairs & Commonwealth Relations	1945	15 August 1947	Indian National Congress

== List of Party Congresses Communist Party of India (Marxist) ==
Congress	Date	Location	Elected Secretary	Ref.
24th	2 – 6 April 2025	Madurai, Tamil Nadu	M. A. Baby	
23rd	6 – 10 April 2022	Kannur, Kerala	Sitaram Yechury	
22rd	18 – 22 April 2018	Hyderabad, Telangana	Sitaram Yechury	
21st	April 2015	Visakhapatnam, Andhra Pradesh	Sitaram Yechury	
20th	April 2012	Calicut, Kerala	Prakash Karat	
19th	29 March – 3 April 2008	Coimbatore, Tamil Nadu	Prakash Karat	
18th	6 – 11 April 2005	New Delhi, Delhi	Prakash Karat	
17th	19 – 24 March 2002	Hyderabad, Andhra Pradesh	Harkishan Singh Surjeet	
16th	5 – 11 October 1998	Calcutta, West Bengal	Harkishan Singh Surjeet	
15th	3 – 8 April 1995	Chandigarh, Punjab	Harkishan Singh Surjeet	
14th	3 – 9 January 1992	Madras, Tamil Nadu	Harkishan Singh Surjeet	
13th	27 December 1988 - 1 January 1989	Trivandrum, Kerala	E. M. S. Namboodiripad	
12th	25 – 29 December 1985	Calcutta, West Bengal	E. M. S. Namboodiripad	
11th	26 – 31 January 1982	Vijayawada, Andhra Pradesh	E. M. S. Namboodiripad	
10th	2 – 8 April 1978	Jalandar, Punjab	E. M. S. Namboodiripad	
9th	27 June – 2 July 1972	Madurai, Tamil Nadu	Puchalapalli Sundarayya	
8th	23 – 29 December 1968	Cochin, Kerala	Puchalapalli Sundarayya	
7th	31 October – 7 November 1964	Calcutta, West Bengal	Puchalapalli Sundarayya	

== Communist Party of India ==
=== Leadership ===
The 24th Party Congress of Communist Party of India was held from 14 to 18 October 2022 in Vijayawada, Andhra Pradesh.

=== General Secretary ===
- D. Raja

==== National Secretariat ====
1. D. Raja
2. Amarjeet Kaur
3. K. Narayana
4. Bhalchandra Kango
5. Pallab Sen Gupta
6. Binoy Viswam
7. Syed Azeez Pasha
8. Nagendra Nath Ojha
9. Rama Krushna Panda
10. Annie Raja
11. Girish Chandra Sharma

== List of general secretaries and chairmen of the CPI ==
Article XXXII of the party constitution says:

"The tenure of the General Secretary and Deputy General Secretary, if any, and State Secretaries is limited to two consecutive terms—a term being of not less than two years. In exceptional cases, the unit concerned may decide by three-fourth majority through secret ballot to allow two more terms. In case such a motion is adopted that comrade also can contest in the election along with other candidates. As regards the tenure of the office-bearers at district and lower levels, the state councils will frame rules where necessary."

General secretaries and chairmen
Number	Photo	Name	Tenure
1st		Sachchidanand Vishnu Ghate	1925–1933
2nd		Gangadhar Adhikari	1933–1935
3rd		Puran Chand Joshi	1936–1948
4th		B. T. Ranadive	1948–1950
5th		Chandra Rajeswara Rao	1950–1951
6th		Ajoy Ghosh	1951–1962
Chairman		Shripad Amrit Dange	1962–1981
7th		E. M. S. Namboodiripad	1962–1964
(-)		Chandra Rajeswara Rao	1964–1990
8th		Indrajit Gupta	1990–1996
9th		Ardhendu Bhushan Bardhan	1996–2012
10th		Suravaram Sudhakar Reddy	2012–2019
11th		D. Raja	2019–Incumbent

== Communist Party of India (Maoist) ==
- Communist Party of India (Maoist)

== List of Sarsanghchalak ==
- Acting

No.	Name	Portrait	Term	Period	Ref.
1	K. B. Hedgewar		27 September 1925 – 1930	5 Years	
-	Laxman Vasudev Paranjape		1930–1931	1 Year	
(1)	K. B. Hedgewar		1931–21 June 1940	9 years	
2	M. S. Golwalkar		21 June 1940 – 5 June 1973	32 years, 349 days	
3	Madhukar Dattatraya Deoras		5 June 1973–March 1994	21 Years	
4	Rajendra Singh		March 1994–10 March 2000	6 years	
5	K. S. Sudarshan		10 March 2000 – 21 March 2009	9 years, 11 days	
6	Mohan Bhagwat		21 March 2009–Incumbent	17 years, 246 days	

== See also ==
- President of India
- Vice President of India
- List of presidents of India
- List of vice presidents of India
- Britons in India
- East India Company (disambiguation)
- British rule in Burma
- British North America
- Colonial India
  - Danish India
  - Dutch India
  - French India
  - Flags of British India
  - Flags of India
  - Portuguese India
- Historiography of the British Empire
- Indian princely states annexed by the British
- Maratha Empire
- Mughal Empire
- Salute state
- Sikh Empire
- Communist Ghadar Party of India
- Ghadar Movement
- Ghadar Mutiny
- Hindu–German Conspiracy

== Footnotes ==
- ^{†} Assassinated or died in office
- ^{§} Returned to office after a previous non-consecutive term
- ^{RES} Resigned
- ^{NC} Resigned following a no-confidence motion
