= Guillaume André d'Hébert =

French Governor of India

Guillaume André d'Hébert (15 January 1653, Paris – 6 May 1725) was Governor General of Pondicherry for two periods. He was preceded by Pierre Dulivier and succeeded by Pierre André Prévost de La Prévostière .

== Titles ==
Government offices
Preceded by Pierre Dulivier	Governor-General of French India (Acting); July 1708 – 1712	Succeeded by Pierre Dulivier
Preceded by Pierre Dulivier	Governor-General of French India; 1717–1718	Succeeded by Pierre André Prévost de La Prévostière
