= Ernest Fernand Lévecque =

French colonial governor (1852–1947)

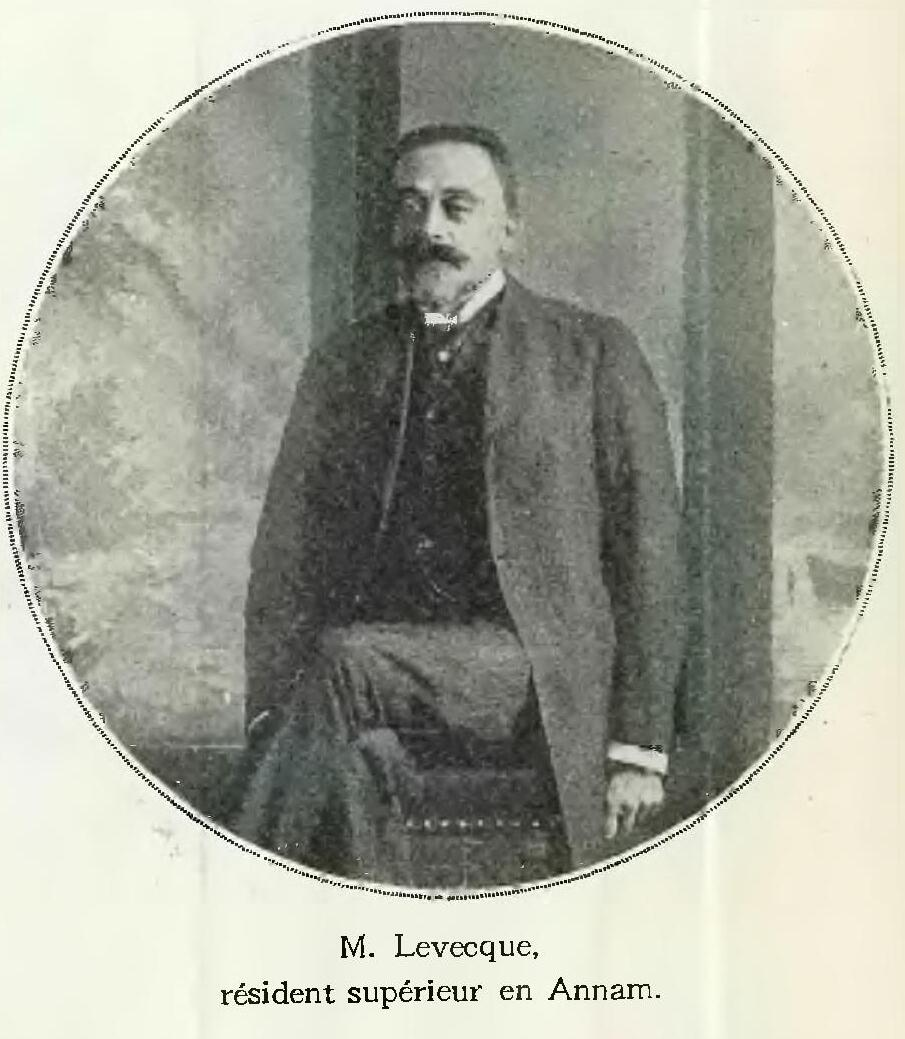
Fernand Lévecque

Ernest Fernand Lévecque (2 September 1852 – 4 July 1947) was a colonial administrator of a number of possessions of the French Colonial Empire. He was born in Beaurieux, Aisne département, France.

== Titles Held ==
- Assemblée Nationale (Chambre des députés) (20 August 1893 – 31 May 1898).

Government offices
Preceded by Jean-Ernest Moulié	Resident of Annam; 1906–1908	Succeeded by Élie Jean-Henri Groleau
Preceded by Adrien Jules Jean Bonhoure	Governor of French India; 1909–9 July 1910	Succeeded by Alfred Albert Martineau
Preceded by Pierre Jean Henri Didelot	Governor of French Guiana; 1914–1916	Succeeded by Pierre Jean Henri Didelot
Preceded by Jules Maurice Gourbeil	Governor of Martinique; 1921–1923	Succeeded by Henri Marius Richard
