= Adrien Juvanon =

French colonial administrator and author

François-Adrien Juvanon (13 August 1875 – 9 February 1950) was a French colonial administrator and author in the French Colonial Empire. Born in La Balme-les-Grottes, he was Governor of French Guiana in 1927, Acting Governor of Saint-Pierre and Miquelon in 1928–29, and Governor of French India 1931–34.

Government offices
| Preceded by Charles Nirpot (Acting) | Governor of Saint-Pierre and Miquelon; 27 February 1928–14 February 1929 | Succeeded by Henri Sautot |
| Preceded by Gabriel Henri Joseph Thaly | Governor of French Guiana; 1927 | Succeeded by Émile Buhot-Launay |
| Preceded by Robert Paul Marie de Guise | Governor of French India; 1931–1934 | Succeeded by Léon Solomiac |
