= François Martin (Pondicherry) =

Governor-general in French India

François Martin (French pronunciation: [fʁɑ̃swa maʁtɛ̃]; 1634 – 1706) was the first Governor-general of Pondicherry in French India. In 1673, Sher Khan Lodi, the ruler of Valikandapuram under the Sultan of Bijapur granted Bellanger de l'Espinay a site for a settlement. A shrewd and able administrator, François Martin, former director of the Machilipatnam lodge of French India, developed Pondicherry, the future capital of French India in 1674, into a thriving port. He is known as the Father of Pondicherry.

The town was taken and sacked by the Dutch East India Company in 1693. François Martin, his family and followers, including Father Tachard, were taken captives to Batavia. Martin and everyone else eventually negotiated their return to Chandannagar and then they were returned to Pondicherry. The forces of the French East India Company took and sacked the town of Pazhaverkadu and returned and restored both the towns to the French and Dutch respectively.

He was the Commissioner of French East India Company before holding this post and was preceded by François Baron and succeeded by Pierre Dulivier. His Mémoires provide an accurate account of early French settlements in the Indian subcontinent. There is a street named after François Martin in Pondicherry.

== Titles ==
Government offices
Preceded by François Baron	Commissioner of French India (Acting); 1681 – October 1693	Succeeded by Dutch Occupation (September 1693-September 1699)
Preceded by Dutch Occupation (September 1693-September 1699)	Governor-General of French India; September 1699 – 31 December 1706	Succeeded by Pierre Dulivier
