= Robert Paul Marie de Guise =

Governor of French India (1872–1940)

Robert Paul Marie de Guise (5 June 1872 – 7 December 1940) was a colonial administrator in various colonies of the French Colonial Empire. While he was Governor of Guinea, he was described as a "negrophobe and a snob" who "hated being here." His diary from the time was full of passages that were equal parts "melancholy homesickness" and "racist ranting." During his brief tenure as governor of Guinea, he vetoed numerous proposals to improve infrastructure in the colony on the grounds that he thought it would be a waste of money and resources.

Government offices
Preceded by Victor Augagneur	Governor General of French Equatorial Africa (Acting); 28 February 1923–8 July 1924	Succeeded by Matteo Mathieu Maurice Alfassa (Acting)
Preceded by Pierre Jean Henri Didelot	Governor of French India; 1928–1931	Succeeded by François Adrien Juvanon
Preceded by Louis François Antonin (Acting)	Governor of Guinea; 28 February 1931–1 January 1932	Succeeded by Joseph Zébédée Olivier Vadier
