= Pierre Jean Henri Didelot =

Governor of French India

Pierre Jean Henri Didelot (12 May 1870 in Paris – 30 October 1941 in Alpes-Maritimes). He was a colonial administrator in various colonies of the French Colonial Empire.

== Titles held ==
Government offices
Preceded by Raphaël Valentin Marius Antonette	Governor of Saint-Pierre and Miquelon; 28 November 1909–1 July 1911	Succeeded by Ferdinand Longue (Acting)
Preceded by Denys Joseph Goujon	Governor of French Guiana (1st Time); 1911–1914	Succeeded by Ernest Fernand Lévecque
Preceded by Ernest Fernand Lévecque	Governor of French Guiana (2nd Time); 1916	Succeeded by Georges Lévy
Preceded by Théophile Antoine Pascal (Acting)	Governor of Sénégal; 17 September 1921–4 July 1925	Succeeded by Camille Théodore Raoul Maillet (Acting)
Preceded by Louis Martial Innocent Gerbinis	Governor of French India; 1926–1928	Succeeded by Robert Paul Marie de Guise

== Honors and awards ==
Knight of the Order of Legion of Honour (1919)
