= Pierre Christoph Le Noir =

Governor of French India

Pierre Christoph Le Noir was Governor General of Pondicherry twice (first time as acting governor). During his rule, Yanaon was added to the French Establishments of India as a third colony in 1727. He expanded the Pondicherry area and made it a large and rich town. He worked as Director for Compagnie perpétuelle des Indes from 8 August 1736 and 7 October 1738 to 26 February 1743.

== Titles ==
Government offices
Preceded by Pierre André Prévost de La Prévostière	Governor-General of French India (Acting); 1721 – 1723	Succeeded by Joseph Beauvollier de Courchant
Preceded by Joseph Beauvollier de Courchant	Governor-General of French India; 1726 – 1734	Succeeded by Pierre Benoît Dumas
