= Pierre Benoît Dumas =

Pierre Benoît Dumas (1668–1745) was the French Governor General for Pondichéry and Réunion. Predecessor of La Bourdonnais on the Isles and Dupleix in the Indies, Dumas hailed from Southern France. There is still a street in Pondicherry named after him.

The City of Réunion was established by him in 1730. It is he who launched the colonization of Réunion island decided by Desforges Boucher. During his 8 years of administration, 244 concessions were allotted between the Gully of Gol and the Gully of the Ramparts. Like Régnault, he wished to create a city around the immense concession (more than 10 km^{2}) which extended du battant des lames au sommet des montagnes on the future location Saint-Pierre. He even made Antoine of Bavaria draw a project of urban plan in a checkerboard and to this, he conceded 48 sites with the river initially on 26 August 1733.

He is also the man of the opening-up. He made Pierre Boisson and Abraham Muron to undertake the construction of a way connecting Saint-Denis to the commune of La Possession. This sinuous layout of 30 kilometers decided on 16 June 1730 was going to become the mountain road. On 3 August 1733 he charged Delisle and River to open the section Sainte-Marie - Saint-Benoît, and the road connecting Saint-Paul initially had the new concession of the River. Some time later, he became governor general for the French Establishments in India.

== Titles ==
Government offices
Preceded by Hélie Dioré	Governor-General of Réunion; 21 July 1727 – 11 July 1735	Succeeded by Bertrand-François Mahé Comte de La Bourdonnais
Preceded by Pierre Christoph Le Noir	Governor-General of French India; November 1734 – 1741	Succeeded by Joseph François Dupleix
