= Pierre André Prévost de La Prévostière =

Pierre André Prévost de La Prévostière (French: [pjɛʁ ɑ̃dʁe pʁevo də la pʁevɔstjɛʁ]) was the Governor General of Pondicherry. During his time in office, France's main interests were more commercial than political. No significant events occurred during his tenure. Significant development started when his successor, Pierre Christoph Le Noir came into office.

Government offices
Preceded by Pierre Dulivier	Governor-General of French India; August 1718 – 11 October 1721	Succeeded by Pierre Christoph Le Noir (Acting)
