= Léon Solomiac =

French civil servant and statesman

Interim President of Syria
- In office 19 November 1931 – 11 June 1932
- Preceded by: Taj al-Din al-Hasani
- Succeeded by: Muhammad Ali Bey al-Abid

Personal details
- Born: 19 October 1876 Cajarc, France
- Died: 10 May 1960 (aged 83) Cannes, France
- Occupation: Civil servant, colonial administrator

Léon Solomiac (19 October 1873 in Cajarc – 10 May 1960 in Cannes) was a colonial administrator in various colonies of the French Colonial Empire.

== Life ==
Solomiac was a son of a shopkeeper. In the course of his career in the French colonial service, he was appointed in July 1925 as a delegate in Beirut then in 1930 in Damascus, during the French Mandate for Syria and the Lebanon. After the deposition of Taj al-Din al-Hasani, Solomiac officiated on 19 November 1931 as head of state of the Syrian Republic until 11 June 1932, when Mohammed Ali al-Abed was elected by the Syrian Parliament to the presidency.

Later on, Solomiac went to Africa in which he became the governor of French Sudan from 22 May to 30 November 1933 on an interim basis. On 15 August 1934 he became the successor of François Adrien Juvanon as a governor of French India, he held this position until October 1936. On 21 April 1939 he became the Governor-General of French Equatorial Africa, he remained in office until 3 September 1939. On 7 November 1940 Solomiac took over from Jean Alexandre Léon Rapenne the interim post of Governor of Niger. However, he was deposed by the Vichy regime as being not loyal to them, and was replaced on 8 December 1940 by General Maurice Falvy. In August 1944, Léon Solomiac was entrusted with the management of official duties of the prefecture of Tarn. He was the "Prefect of the Libération", replacing a prefect appointed by the Vichy regime in July 1944, and was in office until early 1946.

Preceded by René Desjardins (Acting for Fousset)	Governor of Mali (Acting for Fousset); 22 May 1933–30 November 1933	Succeeded by Louis Jacques Eugène Fousset
Preceded by François Adrien Juvanon	Governor of French India; August 1934–1936	Succeeded by Horace Valentin Crocicchia
Preceded by François Joseph Reste	Governor General of French Equatorial Africa (Acting); 21 April 1939–3 September 1939	Succeeded by Pierre François Boisson
Preceded by Jean Alexandre Léon Rapenne	Governor of Niger (Acting); 7 November 1940–8 December 1940	Succeeded by Maurice Falvy
