= Joseph Beauvollier de Courchant =

French governor general

Joseph Beauvollier de Courchant or de Beauvollier de Courchant was Governor general of Pondicherry and Réunion in the French Colonial Empire.

== Titles ==
Government offices
Preceded by Pierre Christoph Le Noir (Acting)	Governor-General of French India; 1723 – 1726	Succeeded by Pierre Christoph Le Noir
Preceded by Henri de Justamond	Governor-General of Réunion; 23 August 1723 – 1 December 1725	Succeeded by Antoine Boucher-Desforges
