= José da Costa Campos =

José da Costa Campos (Pangim, August 9, 1801 - June 7, 1862) was a military man and Portuguese colonial administrator. He was a member of the traditional Costa Campos Portuguese-Goan family, son of Hermenegildo da Costa Campos, field marshal of the Portuguese army in Portuguese India, and Dona Mariana Águia Pereira de Lacerda, of Daman. He was the brother of Luís da Costa Campos, member of the Council of State Government of Portuguese India in 1855, and familiar to many rulers of this former Portuguese state.

He formed the 19th Governing Council of Portuguese India following the death of Manoel José Mendes, the Barão de Candal, in 1840. Soon after a revolt followed the disastrous government of Joaquim Lopes Lima, after a revolt, he formed the 20th Governing Council in 1842, along with António José de Melo Sotomaior Teles and António Ramalho de Sá, the capitular vicar António João de Ataíde and the counselors José de Costa Campos and Caetano de Sousa e Vasconcelos, restoring order in the region until the arrival of the new governor, the Conde das Antas.
