= Pierre Dulivier =

Pierre Dulivier was the Governor General of Pondicherry for two periods. He was preceded by François Martin and succeeded by Guillaume André d'Hébert.

== Titles ==
Government offices
Preceded by François Martin	Governor-General of French India; January 1707 – July 1708	Succeeded by Guillaume André d'Hébert
Preceded by Guillaume André d'Hébert	Governor-General of French India; 1712 – 1717	Succeeded by Guillaume André d'Hébert
