= Kilimanoor =

- Town
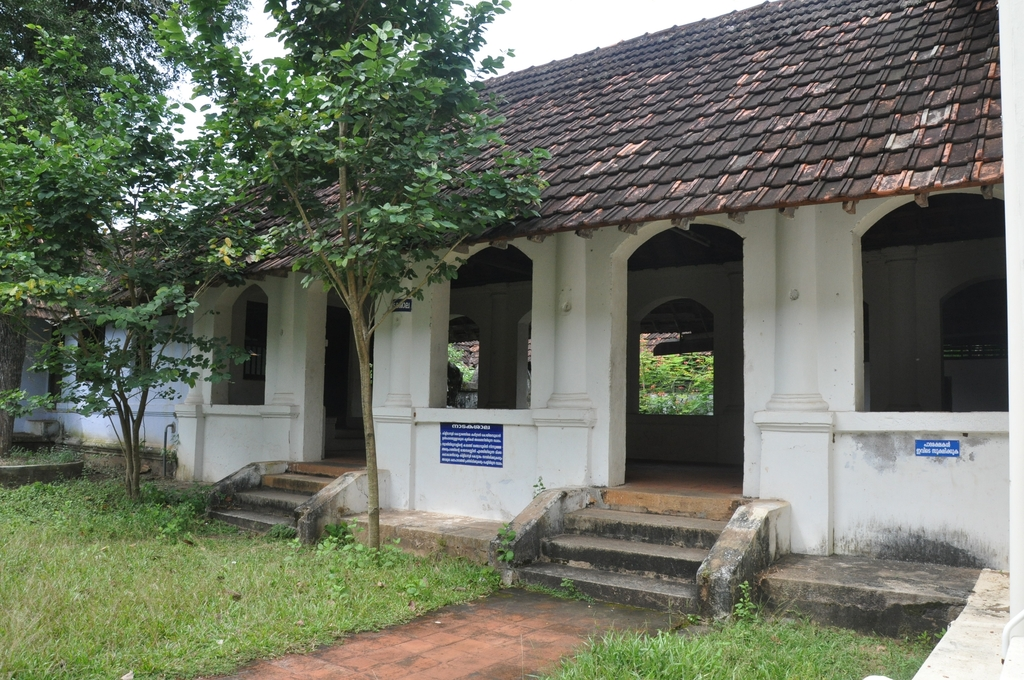
- Kilimanoor Nadakashala

- Location in Kerala, India Kilimanoor (India)
- Coordinates: 8.767°N 76.88°E
- Country: India
- State: Kerala
- District: Thiruvananthapuram

Government
  - Type: Local Self Government
  - Body: Kilimanoor grama panchayat

Area
  - Total: 19.1 km^{2} (7.4 sq mi)

Population (2011)
  - Total: 20,515
  - Density: 1,070/km^{2} (2,780/sq mi)

Languages
  - Official: Malayalam, English
- Time zone: UTC+5:30 (IST)
- PIN: 695601
- Telephone code: 0470
- Vehicle registration: KL 16
- Civic agency: Kilimanoor Panchayat

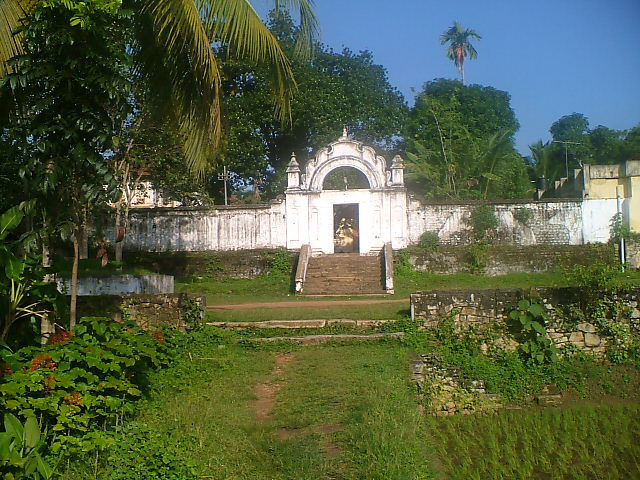
Ancient arch in Kilimanoor

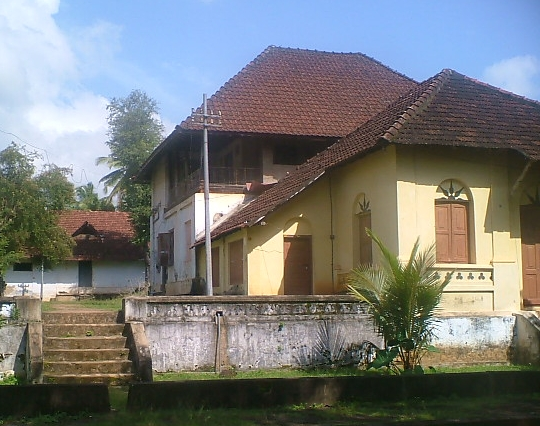
Studio of Raja Ravi Varma

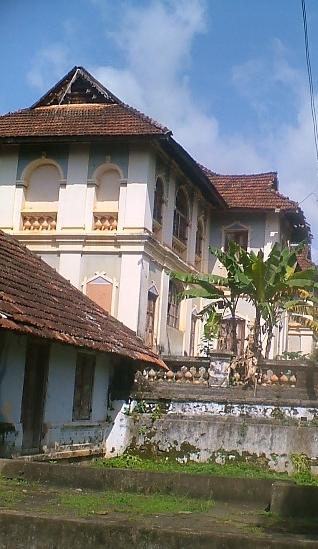
Puthen Malika

Kilimanoor is a panchayat and a town in the Chirayinkeezhu taluk of Thiruvananthapuram district in Kerala, India. It is located on MC/SH 1 Road, 33 kilometres (21 mi) northwest of the city of Thiruvananthapuram (Trivandrum), 14 km (8.7 mi) east of Attingal and 20 km (12 mi) east of Varkala.

== History ==
Kilimanoor ("land of the bird and the deer") was ruled by a Pillai ruling chief and was forfeited to Travancore by Maharaja Marthanda Varma. The estate comprising several villages was then handed over to the family of the father of the King who had come south from Parappanad in Malabar around 1718. was ruled by a chief during time of the Ettuveetil Pillamar in the kingdom of Travancore. The chief rebelled against the Maharajah Marthanda Varma, and the region was annexed and later given to the Royal House of Kilimanoor.

This Royal House of Kilimanoor has a history of more than 300 years. In 1705 (ME 880), the son and two daughters of Ittammar Raja of Beypore Thattarikovilakam, a Parappanad royal house, were adopted by the Royal house of Venad. Parappanad was actually the ruling family of Parappanangadi in present-day Malappuram district. Ittammar Raja's sister and her sons, Rama Varma and Raghava Varma, settled in Kilimanoor and married the now-adopted sisters. Marthanda Varma, the founder of the Kingdom of Travancore was the son of Raghava Varma. Raghava Varma's nephew, Ravi Varma Koil Thampuran, married Marthanda Varma's sister. Their son came to be known as Dharma Raja Kartika Thirunnal Rama Varma. In 1740, when an allied force led by Dutch Captain Hockert supporting the Deshinganadu king attacked Venad, an army from Kilimanoor tactfully resisted and then defeated them. Although a small victory, this was the first time an Indian army defeated a European power. In recognition of this feat, Marthanda Varma, in 1753, exempted the areas under control of Kilimanoor Palace from taxes and proclaimed autonomous status. The present palace complex was also built during this time along with the Ayyappa temple for the family deity.

Velu Thampi Dalawa held meetings at the Kilimanoor Palace, planning his revolts against the British. He handed over his sword at the palace before going for his final battle against the British. India's First President, Dr. Rajendra Prasad received the sword from the palace, and it is now kept at the National Museum, New Delhi. Subsequently, placed at the Napier Museum in the capital city of Kerala.

== Politics ==
The Communist Party of India (Marxist) (CPI(M)) and Communist Party of India (CPI) have a strong base. Attingal Constituency (Scheduled Caste reserved) is part of Attingal (Lok Sabha constituency).

- Indian National Congress
- Communist Party of India (Marxist)
- Bharatiya Janata Party

== Transportation ==
Kilimanoor is on the Main Central Road. It is connected to the whole major destination by buses run by KSRTC from the Kilimanoor bus depot. Kilimanoor is only 33 kilometres (21 mi) away from Thiruvananthapuram. The nearest airport is Trivandrum International Airport. The nearest major railway station is Varkala Railway Station which is 20 km (12 mi) from Kilimanoor.

== Educational organizations ==
- MGM Polytechnic College, Kilimanoor
- Rajadhani Institute of Engineering, Nagaroor, Kilimanoor
- Sree Shankara Vidyapeetom College, Nagaroor, Kilimanoor
- Vidya Academy of Science And Technology, Kilimanoor

== Climate ==
Climate data for Kilimanoor, Kerala
Month	Jan	Feb	Mar	Apr	May	Jun	Jul	Aug	Sep	Oct	Nov	Dec	Year
Mean daily maximum °C (°F)	30.0 (86.0)	30.9 (87.6)	32.1 (89.8)	32.1 (89.8)	31.9 (89.4)	29.7 (85.5)	29.2 (84.6)	29.6 (85.3)	29.9 (85.8)	29.7 (85.5)	29.3 (84.7)	29.4 (84.9)	30.3 (86.6)
Mean daily minimum °C (°F)	22.5 (72.5)	23.2 (73.8)	24.6 (76.3)	25.4 (77.7)	25.5 (77.9)	24.2 (75.6)	23.7 (74.7)	23.8 (74.8)	23.9 (75.0)	23.9 (75.0)	23.5 (74.3)	22.7 (72.9)	23.9 (75.0)
Average precipitation mm (inches)	21 (0.8)	30 (1.2)	56 (2.2)	142 (5.6)	218 (8.6)	382 (15.0)	295 (11.6)	195 (7.7)	184 (7.2)	283 (11.1)	207 (8.1)	61 (2.4)	2,074 (81.5)
Source: Climate-Data.org

== Notable people ==
- Kilimanoor Chandran
- Kilimanoor Raja Raja Varma Koithampuran
- Madavoor Vasudevan Nair
- Kilimanoor Ramakanthan
- Sithara
- A. R. Raja Raja Varma
- C. Raja Raja Varma
- Raja Ravi Varma
- Prajesh Sen

== Tourist attractions ==
- Kilimanoor palace
- Raja Ravi Varma Art gallery
- Thirupalkadal Sreekrishnaswamy Temple
- Kadalukaani Para
- Thampuratti Para

== See also ==
- Kilimanoor Assembly Constituency
- Kilimanoor Block Panchayat
- Pazhayakunnummel Grama Panchayath
- Kilimanoor Grama Panchayath
