= Attingal Assembly constituency =

Constituency of the Kerala legislative assembly in India

Coordinates: 8.69°N 76.81°E

Attingal
- Constituency No. 128 for the Kerala Legislative Assembly
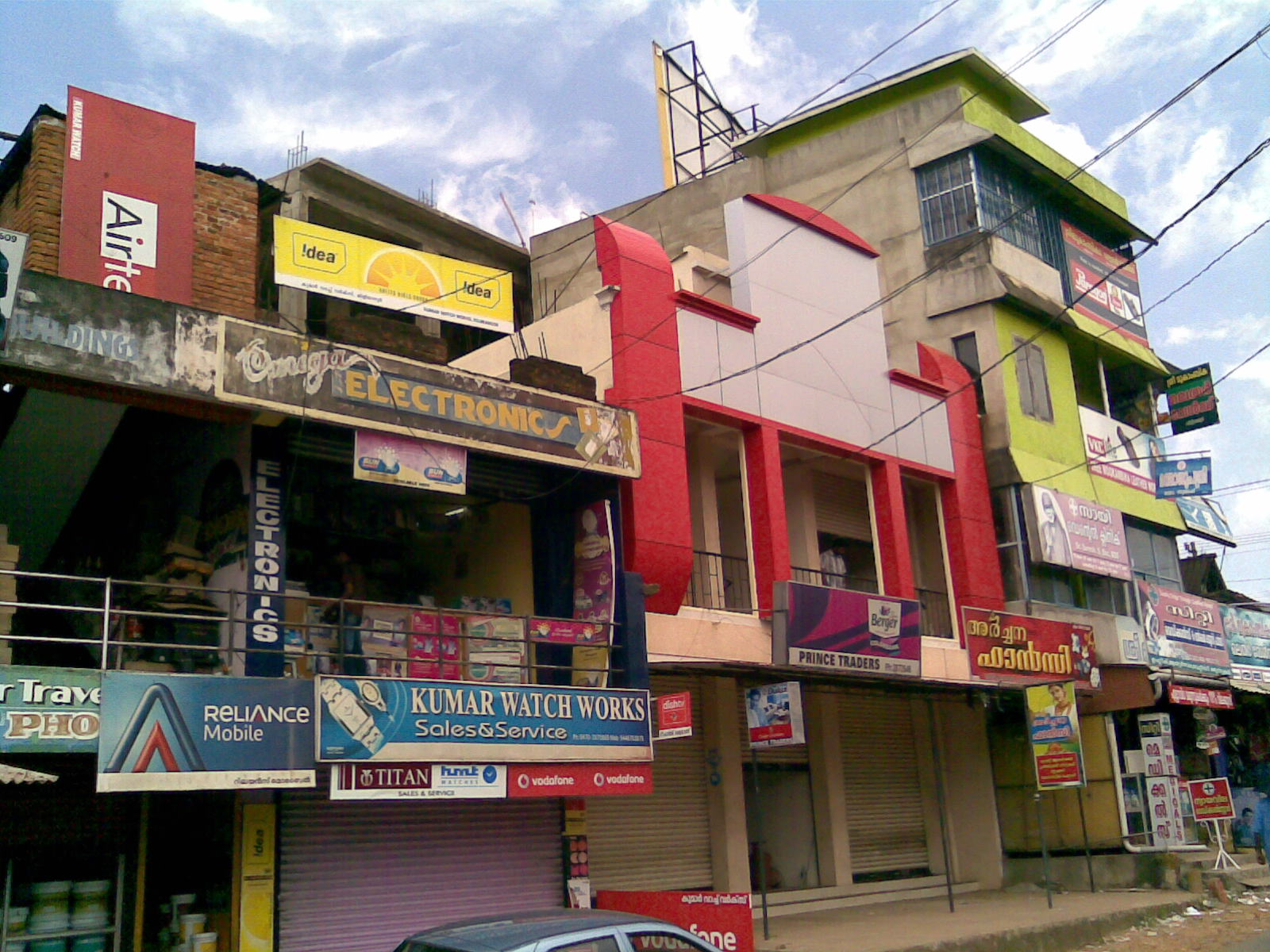
- Kilimanoor town in the constituency.

Constituency details
- Country: India
- Region: South India
- State: Kerala
- District: Thiruvananthapuram
- Lok Sabha constituency: Attingal
- Established: 1957
- Total electors: 2,02,123 (2021)
- Reservation: SC

Member of Legislative Assembly
- 16th Kerala Legislative Assembly
- Incumbent O S Ambika
- Party: CPI(M)
- Alliance: LDF
- Elected year: 2026

Attingal State assembly constituency is one of the 140 state legislative assembly constituencies in Kerala in southern India. It is also one of the seven state legislative assembly constituencies included in Attingal Lok Sabha constituency. As of the 2026 assembly elections, the current MLA is O. S. Ambika of CPI(M).

== Local self-governed segments ==
Attingal Assembly constituency is composed of the following local self-governed segments:

Name	Status (Grama panchayat/Municipality)	Taluk
Attingal	Municipality	Chirayinkeezhu
Karavaram	Grama panchayat	Chirayinkeezhu
Kilimanoor	Grama panchayat	Chirayinkeezhu
Nagaroor	Grama panchayat	Chirayinkeezhu
Pazhayakunnummel	Grama panchayat	Chirayinkeezhu
Pulimath	Grama panchayat	Chirayinkeezhu
Vakkom	Grama panchayat	Chirayinkeezhu
Cherunniyoor	Grama panchayat	Varkala
Manamboor	Grama panchayat	Varkala
Ottoor	Grama panchayat	Varkala

== Members of the Legislative Assembly ==
The following list contains all members of Kerala Legislative Assembly who have represented the constituency:

Election	Member	Party
1957	R. Prakasam	Communist Party of India
1960	N. Kunjuraman	Indian National Congress
1967	K. P. K. Das	Communist Party of India (Marxist)
1970	Vakkom Purushothaman	Indian National Congress
1977	Vakkom Purushothaman	Indian National Congress
1980	Vakkom Purushothaman	Indian National Congress (U)
1982	Vakkom Purushothaman	Independent
1985*	P. Vijayadas	Indian Congress (Socialist)
1987	Anathalavattom Anandan	Communist Party of India (Marxist)
1991	T. Sarath Chandra Prasad	Indian National Congress
1996	Anathalavattom Anandan	Communist Party of India (Marxist)
2001	Vakkom Purushothaman	Indian National Congress
2006	Anathalavattom Anandan	Communist Party of India (Marxist)
2011	B. Satyan	Communist Party of India (Marxist)
2016	B. Satyan	Communist Party of India (Marxist)
2021	O. S. Ambika	Communist Party of India (Marxist)
2026	O. S. Ambika	Communist Party of India (Marxist)

== Election results ==
Percentage change (±%) denotes the change in the number of votes from the immediate previous election.

=== 2026 ===
2026 Kerala Legislative Assembly election: Attingal
Party	Candidate	Votes	%	±%
CPI(M)	O. S. Ambika	59,163	39.46	▼7.89
BJP	P. Sudheer	45,788	30,54	▲4.62
RSP	Santhosh Bhadran	41,372	27.60	▲0.58
SDPI	Jayarajan M	1,019	0.68	−
Anna DHRM	Sunitha Kilimanoor	397	0.26	−
NOTA	None of the above	1,272	0.85	−
Margin of victory		13,375	8.92	▼12.51
Turnout		1,49,916	73.82	▲0.78
CPI(M) hold		Swing		

=== 2021 ===
There were 2,02,123 registered voters in the constituency for the 2021 Kerala Assembly election.

2021 Kerala Legislative Assembly election: Attingal
Party	Candidate	Votes	%	±%
CPI(M)	O. S. Ambika	69,898	47.35	▼5.36
BJP	P. Sudheer	38,262	25.92	▲5.94
RSP	A. Sreedharan	36,938	25.02	▲1.55
NOTA	None of the above	1,071	0.72	
BSP	Vipinlal Vidhyadharan	927	0.63	▲0.06
Independent	Ambili	191	0.13	−
Margin of victory		31,636	21.43	▼7.81
Turnout		1,47,626	73.04	▲3.51
CPI(M) hold		Swing	▼5.36	

=== 2016 ===
There were 1,98,678 registered voters in the constituency for the 2016 Kerala Assembly election.

2016 Kerala Legislative Assembly election: Attingal
Party	Candidate	Votes	%	±%
CPI(M)	B. Satyan	72,808	52.71	▼2.73
RSP	K. Chandrababu	32,425	23.47	
BJP	Raji Prasad	27,602	19.98	▲15.75
SDPI	M. K. Manoj Kumar	1,437	1.04	▼0.32
NOTA	None of the above	1,267	0.92	
BSP	K. Sivanandan	789	0.57	▼0.51
Independent	Rajesh R.	639	0.46	
SS	B. Jayanthakumar	597	0.43	
Independent	C. R. Thulasi	411	0.30	
Independent	Pratheeshkumar P.	162	0.12	
Margin of victory		40,383	29.24	▲3.02
Turnout		1,38,137	69.53	▲2.76
CPI(M) hold		Swing	▼2.73	

=== 2011 ===
There were 1,71,684 registered voters in the constituency for the 2011 election.

2011 Kerala Legislative Assembly election: Attingal
Party	Candidate	Votes	%	±%
CPI(M)	B. Satyan	63,558	55.44	
INC	Thankamony Divakaran	33,493	29.22	
Independent	Attingal Suresh	7,857	6.85	
BJP	P. P. Vava	4,844	4.23	
Independent	V. V. Selvaraj	1,713	1.49	
SDPI	K. G. Soman	1,561	1.36	
BSP	M. Chinamma	1,235	1.08	
Independent	G. Anirudhan	377	0.33	
Margin of victory		30,065	26.22	
Turnout		1,14,638	66.77	
CPI(M) hold		Swing		

=== 2006 ===
2006 Kerala Legislative Assembly election: Attingal
Party	Candidate	Votes	%	±%
CPI(M)	Anathalavattom Anandan	42,912	53.75	
INC	C Mohanachandran	31,704	39.71	
Margin of victory		11,208	14.04	
Turnout		79,836		
CPI(M) gain from INC		Swing		

=== 2001 ===
There were 1,36,588 registered voters in the constituency for the 2001 election.

2001 Kerala Legislative Assembly election: Attingal
Party	Candidate	Votes	%	±%
INC	Vakkom Purushothaman	51,139	53.68	
CPI(M)	Kadakampally Surendran	40,323	42.33	
Margin of victory		10,816	11.35	
Turnout		95,259	69.75	
INC gain from CPI(M)		Swing		

=== 1996 ===
There were 1,26,378 registered voters in the constituency for the 1996 election.

1996 Kerala Legislative Assembly election: Attingal
Party	Candidate	Votes	%	±%
CPI(M)	Anathalavattom Anandan	42,161	48.69	
INC	Vakkom Purushothaman	41,145	47.52	
Independent	S Kuttappan Chettiar	1,311	1.51	
Margin of victory		1,016	1.17	
Turnout		86,592	69.98	
CPI(M) gain from INC		Swing		

=== 1991 ===
There were 1,30,610 registered voters in the constituency for the 1991 election.

1991 Kerala Legislative Assembly election: Attingal
Party	Candidate	Votes	%	±%
INC	T Saratchandra Prasad	41,964	48.60	
CPI(M)	Anathalavattom Anandan	41,527	48.10	
BJP	G Krishnan Kutty	1,386	1.61	
Margin of victory		437	0.50	
Turnout		86,343	67.33	
INC gain from CPI(M)		Swing		

=== 1987 ===
There were 1,11,784 registered voters in the constituency for the 1987 election.

1987 Kerala Legislative Assembly election: Attingal
Party	Candidate	Votes	%	±%
CPI(M)	Anathalavattom Anandan	42,413	52.72	
INC	Kaviyad Divakara Panicker	33,528	41.68	
Margin of victory		8,885	11.11	
Turnout		80,447	72.44	
CPI(M) gain from IC(S)		Swing		

=== 1985 by-election ===
1985 by-election: Attingal
Party	Candidate	Votes	%	±%
IC(S)	P. Vijayadas	36,430	51.38	
INC	S. Kunjukrishnan	30,997	43.71	
Margin of victory		5,433	7.67	
Turnout		70,900		
IC(S) gain from INC		Swing		

=== 1982 ===
There were 89,839 registered voters in the constituency for the 1982 election.

1982 Kerala Legislative Assembly election: Attingal
Party	Candidate	Votes	%	±%
Independent	Vakkom Purushothaman	31,791	53.41	
IC(S)	P. Vijayadas	24,432	41.04	
Margin of victory		7,359	8.37	
Turnout		59,527	66.86	
Independent gain from INC(U)		Swing		

=== 1980 ===
There were 92,008 registered voters in the constituency for the 1980 election.

1980 Kerala Legislative Assembly election: Attingal
Party	Candidate	Votes	%	±%
INC(U)	Vakkom Purushothaman	35,634	59.14	
Independent	Vakkom Devarajan	22,561	37.45	
Margin of victory		13,073	21.69	
Turnout		60,250	65.81	
INC(U) gain from INC		Swing		

=== 1977 ===
There were 79,079 registered voters in the constituency for the 1977 election.

1977 Kerala Legislative Assembly election: Attingal
Party	Candidate	Votes	%	±%
INC	Vakkom Purushothaman	32,452	56.08	
CPI(M)	Varkala Radhakrishnan	23,892	41.29	
Margin of victory		8,560	14.79	
Turnout		57,863	75.01	
INC hold		Swing		

=== 1970 ===
There were 75,679 registered voters in the constituency for the 1970 election.

1970 Kerala Legislative Assembly election: Attingal
Party	Candidate	Votes	%	±%
INC	Vakkom Purushothaman	33,637	58.34	
CPI(M)	V. Sreedharan	22,106	38.34	
Margin of victory		11,531	20.0	
Turnout		57,660	76.66	
INC gain from CPI(M)		Swing		

=== 1965 ===
1965 Kerala Legislative Assembly election: Attingal
Party	Candidate	Votes	%	±%
CPI(M)	K. Anirudhan	25,598	47.75%	
INC	R. Sankar	23,515	43.87%	
Margin of victory		2,083	3.88	
CPI(M) gain from INC		Swing		

== See also ==
- Attingal
- Thiruvananthapuram district
- List of constituencies of the Kerala Legislative Assembly
- 2016 Kerala Legislative Assembly election
