= Kilimanoor Block Panchayat =

Rural local government body in Trivandrum district, Kerala, India

Kilimanoor is a block panchayat in the Trivandrum district of Kerala, India.

== Grama Panchayaths ==
- Pazhayakunnummel
- Pulimath
- Kilimanoor Grama Panchayath
- Nagaroor
- Madavoor
- Pallikkal (Kilimanoor)
- Karavaram
- Navaikulam

President: Adv. Thajudeen Ahmed

District	Trivandrum
Block	Kilimanoor
Area	179.77 km^{2}
Divisions	15
Population	185520
Male	88999
Female	96521
Population density	
