= Anathalavattom Anandan =

Indian politician (1937–2023)

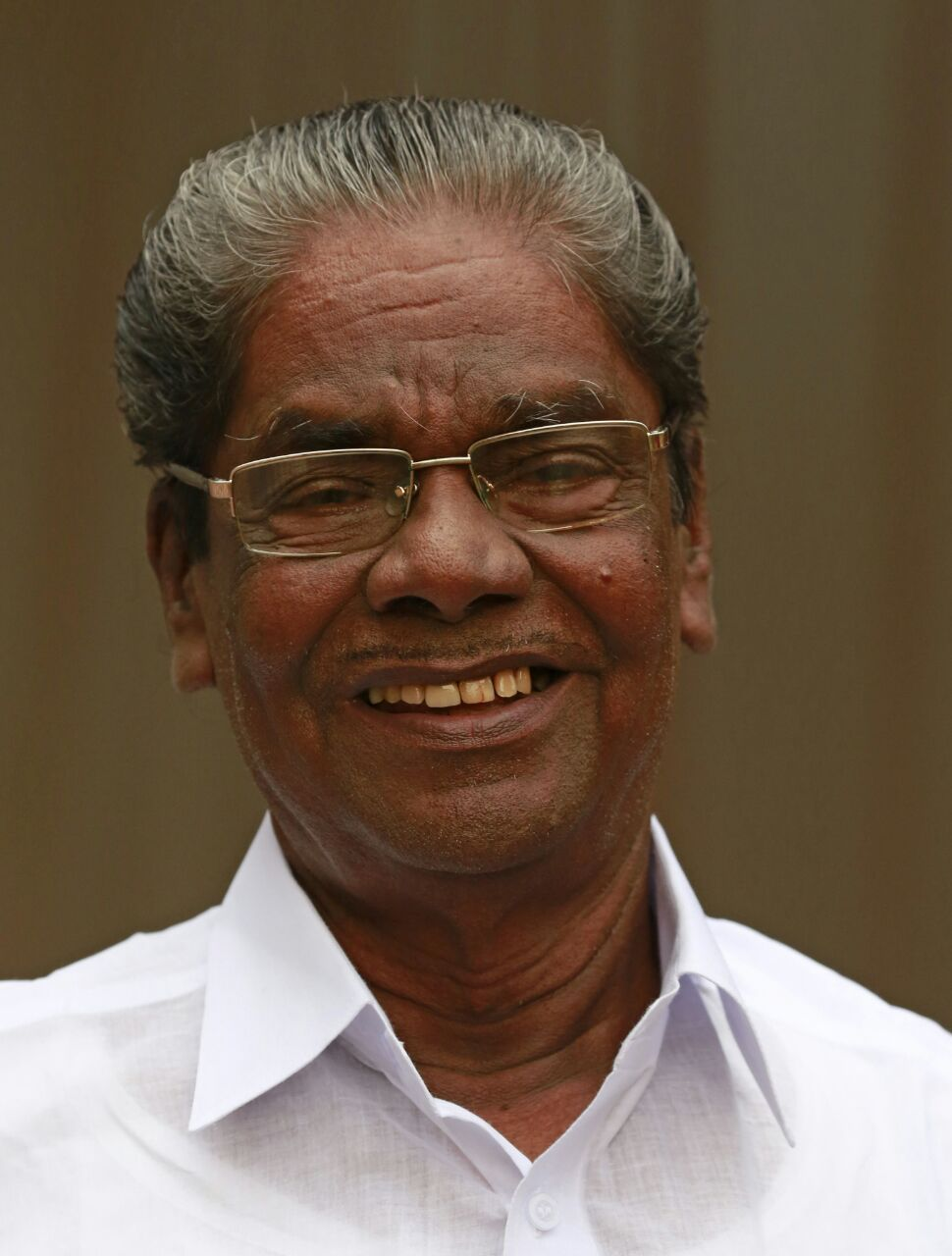

Member of the Kerala Legislative Assembly
- Constituency: Attingal
- In office 1987 – 1991
- Preceded by: Vakkom Purushothaman
- Succeeded by: Adv. T. Sarath Chandra Prasad
- In office 1996 – 2001
- Preceded by: Adv. T. Sarath Chandra Prasad
- Succeeded by: Vakkom Purushothaman
- In office 2006 – 2011
- Preceded by: Vakkom Purushothaman
- Succeeded by: B. Satyan

Personal details
- Born: Krishnan Anandan; 22 April 1937 Anathalavattom, Travancore, British Raj (present day Thiruvananthapuram, Kerala, India)
- Died: 5 October 2023 (aged 86) Thiruvananthapuram, Kerala, India
- Party: Communist Party of India (Marxist)
- Spouse: Laila Anandan
- Parents: V. Krishnan; Nani Amma
- Occupation: Politician
- Committees: Coir Commission; Estimate Committee; Public Undertaking Committee; Committee on Environment; Public Accounts Committee

Anathalavattom Anandan (22 April 1937 – 5 October 2023) was an Indian politician, a trade unionist and a member of Communist Party of India (Marxist). He was the President of the Kerala State Committee and national Vice President of the Centre of Indian Trade Unions and the State Secretariat Member of the CPI(M) Kerala State Committee. Anandan was also the President of Kerala Coir Workers Centre. He was elected thrice to the Kerala Legislative Assembly from Attingal constituency in 1987, 1996 and 2006. The Government of Kerala had appointed him as the Vice Chairman of Apex Body for Coir in August 2016.

== Personal life ==
Anathalavattom Anandan was born to V. Krishnan and Nani Amma on 22 April 1937 in Anathalavattom in Thiruvananthapuram district. He was married to Laila and had two children, Jeeva Anandan and Mahesh Anandan.

Anandan died on 5 October 2023, at the age of 86.

== Political career ==
Anandan started his political activities during his school days, and became a member of the Communist Party during 1956. In 1958, he worked as a coir laborer and organized his co-workers to form one of the first Coir Co-operative Societies in Anathalavattom. That same year, Anandan led a rally to increase the daily wages of coir workers from half ana to one ana. Since then, he has worked for the uplift of the downtrodden and led many struggles for better work and wages for coir workers.

Anandan actively participated in various trade union agitations and strikes, and was arrested and detained on several occasions, as well as injured during protests. During the Emergency in India, he went underground for a year and a half and was declared a wanted fugitive under the Maintenance of Internal Security Act. He was arrested in November 1976 and detained until the lifting of the Emergency.

Anandan was the leader of three state marches (കാല്‍നട ജാഥകള്‍) of the Coir Worker's Union: in 1973 to protest against the local police killing of Comrade Ammu, a coir worker at Vazhamuttom in Thiruvananthapuram district; in 1974 to press for better work and wages; and the famous Coir Strike in 1975.

A senior trade union activist, Anandan was elected as the President of the CITU Kerala State unit in its 12th and 13th State Conferences. He has also been a member of the All India Working Committee of CITU since 1979, and has served as the Thiruvananthapuram District President of CITU.

Anandan was elected as the General Secretary of the Kerala Coir Workers Centre (CITU) in 1973. After serving as the General Secretary of the centre, Mr. Anandan was elected president, succeeding Dr. T. M. Thomas Isaac in 2017. He was also the general secretary of Travancore Coir Thozhilali Union from 1970 to 1995.

Anandan was elected to the Thiruvananthapuram District Committee in 1971, in 1984 to the State Committee, and in 2009 to the State Secretariat of the Communist Party of India (Marxist). Mr. Anandan is the first member to represent CPI(M)'s state secretariat from Thiruvananthapuram district.

Anandan served as the director of the Kerala State Coir Marketing Federation (Coirfed) from 1979 to 2001, and in 1989 assumed the office of Chairman of Coirfed. He became Vice Chairman of Coir Board thrice, and also served as an executive committee member. He was also the Vice Chairman of National Coir Research & Management Institute (NCRMI). He has also served as the Chairman of Foam Mattings India Ltd.

Anandan traveled widely to various parts of the world to promote Coir Geotextiles and to find markets for Coir products. He visited the United States of America, United Kingdom, Canada, Italy, Switzerland, Egypt etc. He also visited various Gulf countries.

Anandan served as the President of Chirayinkeezhu Grama Panchayath from 1979 to 1984, and was then elected to the Kerala Legislative Assembly three times from Attingal Constituency in 1987, 1996 and in 2006. He was an active member in the Kerala Legislative Assembly, and raised many issues related to the people in the House. As part of his activities in the Assembly, Anandan served as the Chairman of Estimates Committee, the Public Undertaking Committee, and the Committee on Environment, as well as a member of the Public Accounts Committee (2008–11). Mr. Anandan was the Chief whip of the Government from 2006 to 2011 in the Left Democratic Front ministry.

Anandan served as the Chirayinkeezhu Taluk committee member of the Communist Party, Attingal Area Secretary, Chirayinkeezhu Local Committee secretary, General Secretary of Travancore Coir Thozhilali Union, Thiruvananthapuram District Motor Workers Union, Taluk Press Workers Union, Taluk Sawmill Workers Union, Taluk Taxi Drivers Union, and Thengu Kayatta Thozhilali Union. He was the President of the Serifed Employees Union, Consumer Federation Employees Association, and SIDCO Employees Association.

Anandan was later the president of the Kerala State Road Transport Employees Association (KSRTEA), Kerala Financial Corporation Officers' Association, Kerala State Co-Operative Bank Employees Federation, Khadi Board Employees Association, and Travancore Titanium Officers' Association.

== Awards ==
1. Coir Mitra Award - Awarded by Coir Board, Ministry of MSME, Govt. of India in 2016.

2. Coir Millennium Award - awarded by Coir Board, Ministry of ARI, Govt of India in 2000.

3. Coir Award 2009, instituted by the Kerala State government.

4. Coir Award 2010–11, for Longstanding Experience and Contribution to the Coir Sector, Government of Kerala

5. C. Kesavan Memorial Award 2016, instituted by C. Kesavan Smaraka Samithy

6. N. Sreekandan Nair Puraskaram 2018, instituted by Revolutionary Socialist Party (Leninist).

7. INA Hero Vakkom Khadar Award 2021 instituted by INA Hero Vakkom Khader Association & Research Library
