= Madan Mohan Lakhera =

Indian army lieutenant general (1937–2026)

M. M. Lakhera PVSM, AVSM, VSM
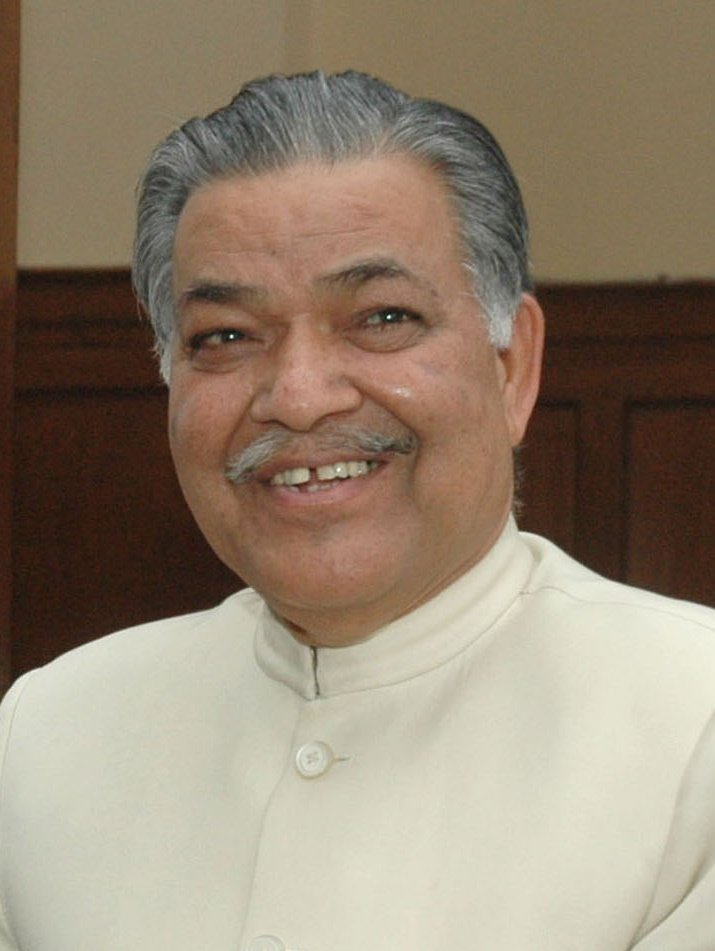
- Lakhera in 2008

8th Governor of Mizoram
- In office 25 July 2006 – 2 September 2011
- Chief Minister: Zoramthanga; Lal Thanhawla
- Preceded by: Amolak Rattan Kohli
- Succeeded by: Vakkom Purushothaman

Lieutenant Governor of Puducherry
- In office 7 July 2004 – 18 July 2006
- Chief Minister: N. Rangaswamy
- Preceded by: Nagendra Nath Jha
- Succeeded by: Mukut Mithi

Lieutenant Governor of the Andaman and Nicobar Islands (additional charge)
- In office 12 February 2006 – 29 December 2006
- Preceded by: Ramchandra "Ram" Kapse
- Succeeded by: Bhopinder Singh

Personal details
- Born: 21 October 1937 Jakhand, United Provinces, British India (Now in Uttarakhand, India)
- Died: 29 June 2026 (aged 88) Dehradun, Uttarakhand, India
- Spouse: Pushpa Lakhera
- Education: Rashtriya Indian Military College; National Defence Academy; Indian Military Academy

Lt Gen (Ret.) Madan Mohan Lakhera, PVSM, AVSM, VSM (21 October 1937 – 29 June 2026) was an Indian army lieutenant general who was Governor of the state of Mizoram. He held that position from July 2006 until September 2011. During 2004–2006, he was the Lieutenant Governor of the Union Territory of Puducherry, then known as Pondicherry. He also served as the Lieutenant Governor of the Union Territory of Andaman and Nicobar Islands, while holding additional charge.

== Early life and education ==
Madan Mohan Lakhera was born on 21 October 1937, in Jakhand village, Tehri Garhwal, located in what is today the Indian state of Uttarakhand, to a Brahmin family. He was educated at the prestigious Rashtriya Indian Military College, Dehradun, and later, the National Defence Academy, Khadakwasla. Lakhera was commissioned as an officer into the Indian Army from the Indian Military Academy, Dehradun, on 8 June 1958. He also attended the elite Defence Services Staff College, Wellington, Tamil Nadu.

== Army career ==
=== Early service ===
During his service in the Indian Army, MM Lakhera participated in the 1961 liberation of Goa, and the Indo-Pakistan wars of 1965 and 1971 in the Jammu and Kashmir sector. He later attended the Defence Services Staff College at Wellington (South India) and the Long Gunnery Staff Course at the School of Artillery, Devlali. He also attended Senior Defence Management Course at College of Defence Management of Secundrabad. He served as an instructor at the School of Artillery from 1967 to 1970, and subsequently at the Army War College from 1978 to 1981. Eventually, Lieutenant Colonel (at the time) Lakhera rose to command the 4th Battation of the Kumaon Regiment in Jammu & Kashmir from December 1975 to July 1978.

=== Higher command ===
On promotion to brigadier, Lakhera assumed command of a brigade at Kanpur. The formation took part in operation 'Blue Star' in Punjab in 1984 and also provided effective aid to Civil authority at Kanpur during 1984 riots. For his successful handling of these operations, (then) Brigadier Lakhera, was awarded the Chief of Army Staff's Commendation Card twice—i.e., on 15 January 1985 and 15 August 1985. He subsequently held the appointment of sub area commander in Kashmir valley, in the rank of brigadier, where besides being responsible for logistical support to forward troops, he was responsible for aid to civilian authorities in the sensitive Kashmir valley. For his successful efforts in performing varied tasks, and for his professional competence in the discharge of his duty, Lakhera was awarded the Vishisht Seva Medal by the President of India on 26 January 1990.

Lakhera was promoted to major general in March 1990, and posted as chief of staff of the Kashmir Valley-based Corps Headquarters. He was actively involved in coordination of all counter-insurgency operations, including the sealing of the line of control in the Kashmir Valley and Ladakh Sector. At this stage, for his success in discharging his responsibilities, Major General Lakhera was awarded the Ati Vishisht Seva Medal by the President of India on 26 January 1991. He subsequently commanded an infantry division.

In 1992, Lakhera was promoted to the rank of lieutenant general, and was initially posted as Chief of Staff of Headquarters, Central Army Command. Besides other operational and administrative responsibilities, in the aftermath of the Ayodhya incident in December 1992, General Lakhera was responsible for coordinating army assistance to a beleaguered civil administration in the sensitive States of Uttar Pradesh, Bihar, Madhya Pradesh and Orissa. He was subsequently posted as chief of staff, Headquarters, Northern Army Command, dealing with the volatile insurgency in the State of Jammu and Kashmir.

In June 1993, General Lakhera took over as Adjutant General of the Indian Army, where he was actively involved with policy framing on all aspects of Manpower Planning & Management including Defence civilians. The General also served as the colonel commandant of his parent Kumaon Regiment. For distinguished services of most exceptional order, he was awarded the Param Vishisht Seva Medal by the President of India on 26 January 1995.

== Lieutenant Governor of Puducherry ==
Lakhera took over as Lieutenant Governor of Puducherry on 7 July 2004. He was, at the time, the first person from Garhwal Division to hold a gubernatorial appointment. As the lieutenant governor, he was involved in organizing the government machinery to come to the immediate aid of the victims of the 2004 Indian Ocean earthquake and tsunami in Puducherry. He personally monitored the progress of relief and rehabilitation measures and took a personal interest in bringing about a definite and positive change in the life of the tsunami affected villagers.

=== Revival of Puducherry Panchayat elections ===
Lakhera's tenure in Puducherry witnessed the conduct of Panchayat and municipal elections after a span of 38 years. Elections to the 12th Puducherry Legislative Assembly were also held during his tenure in a free and fair manner, and without any incident.

== Additional charge as Lieutenant Governor of the Andaman and Nicobar Islands ==
Lakhera was assigned additional charge as Lt. Governor of the Andaman and Nicobar Islands, administered the oath of office and the oath of secrecy on 29 November 2005.

== Governor of Mizoram ==
As Governor of Mizoram he took over as Governor of Mizoram from 25 July 2006. On assuming the appointment he visited all district headquarters to familiarize himself with the problems of the people on ground.

== Personal life and death ==
Madan Mohan Lakhera was married to Pushpa Lakhera, a social activist, who took an active part in resolving the problems of women, particularly those of the defence services and ex-service families. He died on 29 June 2026, at the age of 88.

== Dates of rank ==
Second lieutenant, Indian Army: June 1958
Lieutenant colonel, Indian Army: December 1975
Major-general, Indian Army: March 1990
Lieutenant-general, Indian Army: September 1992

== See also ==
- Governor (India)
- List of current Indian governors
- List of governors of Mizoram

Government offices
Preceded by Nagendra Nath Jha	Lieutenant Governor of Puducherry; 2004–2006	Succeeded by Mukut Mithi
Preceded by Ramchandra "Ram" Kapse	Lieutenant Governor of the Andaman and Nicobar Islands, acting 2006	Succeeded by Bhopinder Singh
