= Kilimanoor Palace =

Palace in Kerala, India

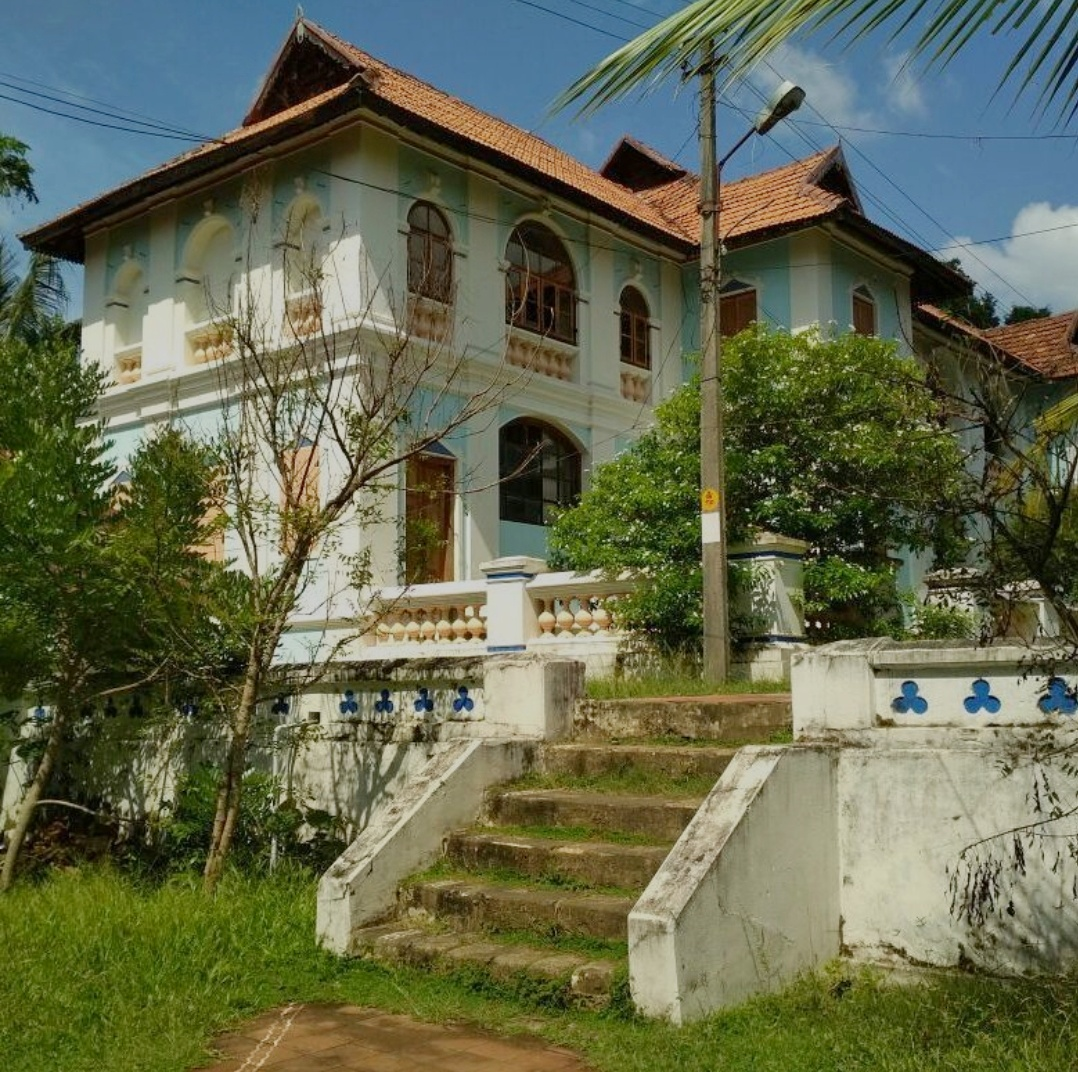
- Main Palace building

- Location within Kerala Location within India

General information
- Architectural style: Kerala architecture
- Location: Kilimanoor, India
- Coordinates: 8°45′46″N 76°51′56″E
- Completed: 1753
- Client: Maharaja of Travancore

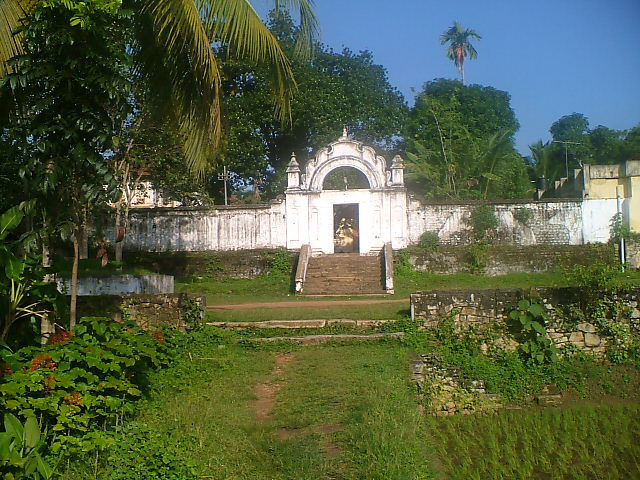
Entrance to the Kilimanoor Palace or "Arch"

Kilimanoor Palace is a palace located in Kilimanoor, in the Indian state of Kerala. It is the birthplace of painter Raja Ravi Varma and Raghava Varma, the father of king Marthanda Varma.

== The Palace ==
The Palace complex covers more than six hectares, and comprises the traditional residential structures of Kerala, like the Nalukettu, small and medium-sized buildings, three ponds, wells and sacred groves (kaavu).

Raja Ravi Varma is said to have built and maintained some of the buildings from the proceeds of his paintings. Families related to the Travancore royal house continue to live here.

== History ==
The royal house at Choottayil, Kilimanoor has a history stretching back more than 300 years, although the oldest buildings are from a much earlier period.

=== Association with the Travancore royal house ===
In 1705, the son and two daughters of Ittammar Raja of Beypore Thattarikovilakam, the northern branch of Parappanad royal house, were adopted into the royal house of Venad. The Ittammar Raja's sister and her sons, Rama Varma and Raghava Varma, settled in Kilimanoor and married the now-adopted sisters.

The lands around the present-day palace were a part of an estate which originally belonged to a Pillai ruling chief. The estate comprised several villages and was handed over to the family of Raghava Varma. Maharaja Marthanda Varma, the founder of the Kingdom of Travancore, was the son of Raghava Varma.

In 1739, after Marthanda Varma ascended the throne, an alliance led by the Dutch Captain Hockert, was formed between Kochi, Thekkumkoor, Desinganadu and Purakkad, due to their shared enmity towards Marthanda Varma. In 1740, this allied force attacked Venad and an army from Kilimanoor resisted and subsequently defeated them in the Battle of Colachel. Although a small victory, this was the first time an Indian army had defeated a European power.

In 1753, in recognition of this feat, Marthanda Varma exempted the areas controlled by the Kilimanoor Palace, as well as most of the area under the present Kilimanoor and Pazhayakunnummel panchayats from taxes, and granted them autonomous status. Although the estate had been under his rule earlier, the present palace complex was built in 1753, together with the Ayyappa temple. The original temple was at Nerumkaithakotta, near Kozhikode for the family deity, Sastha or Ayyapan.

In the early 19th century, Velu Thampi Dalawa held meetings at Kilimanoor Palace while planning uprisings against the British. In 1809, he handed over his sword at the Palace before going into his final battle against the British. India's first President, Dr Rajendra Prasad received this sword from the palace and it was kept in the National Museum in Delhi. Afterwards the sword was moved to the Napier Museum in Thiruvananthapuram.

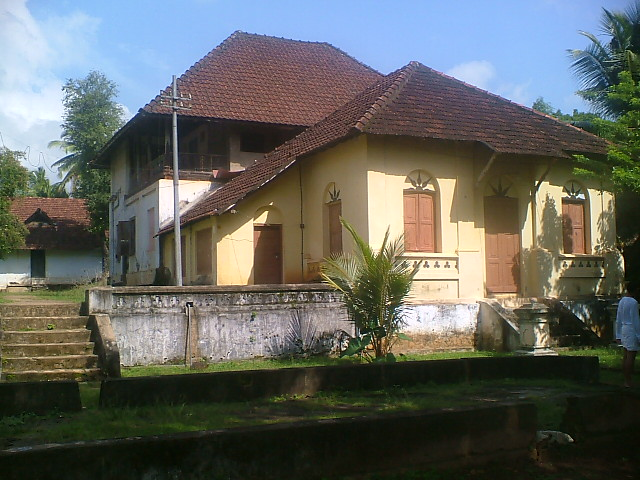
Birthplace of Raja Ravi Varma with his studio in the foreground

== Personalities ==
- Raja Ravi Varma, painter
- Kareendran Thampuran, poet, composer, childhood friend of Swathi Thirunal
- Bharani Thirunal Raja Raja Varma Koil Thampuran, painter and uncle of Raja Ravi Varma.
- C. Raja Raja Varma Koil Thampuran, painter, brother of Raja Ravi Varma
- Shri. Madhavan Vaidyan, Kilimanoor Royal Physician .
- K. R. Ravi Varma, Painter and Nephew of Raja Ravi Varma
- Mangala Bhai Thampuratty, Painter, Sister of Raja Ravi Varma
- Dr. K. R. Bhaskara Varma, Grandson of Mangala Bhai Thampuratty and Who was the first Doctor of Kilimanoor.
- Pooram Nal Kerala Varma Koil Thampuran, Who was the first graduate in the Kilimanoor Palace, Father Of Sethu Lakshmi Bayi, Regent- Maharani of Travancore
- Dr. K. R. Ravi Varma, Physician, Great grandson of Mangala Bhai Thampuratty (Present Valia Thampuran Of Kilimanoor Palace)
- Dr. K. Goda Varma z Famous Writer, Historian, Sanskrit scholar, Teacher
- Dr. K. Marthanda Varma z Historian
- Adv. K. K. Varma, Former Maneger of Kilimanoor RRVHSS And Son-in-law of Sethu Lakshmi Bayi
- Thiruvathira Nal Ravi Varma Koil Thampuran, Father Of Sreechithira Thirunal Bala Rama Varma Who was the Last ruler of Travancore

== See also ==
- Marthandavarma (novel)
