= Korambayil Ahamed Haji =

Indian politician

Korambayil Ahamed Haji (16 July 1930 – 12 May 2003), born Korambayil Ahamed, later honorific Haji, was an Indian politician from Kerala. He served as the Deputy Speaker of Kerala Legislative Assembly from October 1986 to March 1987 in the Third Karunakaran ministry.

Ahamed Haji also served Kerala State General Secretary of the Indian Union Muslim League.

== Member of Legislative Assembly ==
Constituency	Election	Tenure	Assembly	Position	Chief Minister
Mankada	1977	1977 – 80	5th	Government	K. Karunakaran (1977)
Mankada	1977	1977 – 80	5th	Government	A. K. Antony (1977–78)
Mankada	1977	1977 – 80	5th	Government	P. K. Vasudevan Nair (1978–79)
Mankada	1977	1977 – 80	5th	Government	C. H. Mohammed Koya (1979)
Kuttippuram	1980	1980 – 82	6th	Government	E. K. Nayanar (1980–81)
Kuttippuram	1980	1980 – 82	6th	Opposition	K. Karunakaran (1981–82)
Kuttippuram	1982	1982 – 87	7th	Government	K. Karunakaran (1982–87)
Kuttippuram	1987	1987 – 91	8th	Opposition	E. K. Nayanar (1987 - 1991)

== Member of Parliament ==
Rajya Sabha
State	Election	Tenure	Party
Kerala	1998	1998 – 2003	Indian Union Muslim League
