= Thalekunnil Basheer =

Indian politician (1945–2022)

Member of Parliament, Lok Sabha
- In office 1984–1991
- Constituency: Chirayinkeezhu

Member of Parliament, Rajya Sabha
- In office 1977–1984

Member of Kerala Legislative Assembly
- In office March 1977 – July 1977
- Constituency: Kazhakootam

Personal details
- Born: 7 March 1945 Thalekunnu, Travancore, British Raj
- Died: 25 March 2022 (aged 77) Vembayam, Kerala, India

Thalekunnil Basheer (7 March 1945 – 25 March 2022) was an Indian politician from Indian National Congress. Basheer first entered politics in 1977, when he was elected to the Kazhakuttam Legislative Assembly. After Congress named A.K. Antony as Chief Minister, Basheer resigned his seat to allow Antony to run for the Assembly. He was a member of Rajya Sabha from 1977 to 1979 and from 1979 to 1984, and a member of Lok Sabha from 1984 to 1989 and 1989 to 1991 when he was elected in the Chirayankeezhu Lok Sabha seat. He later served as District Congress Committee president, Thiruvananthapuram and general secretary, and vice president of KPCC. He also served as Acting President of Kerala Pradesh Congress Committee in 2011 when KPCC President Ramesh chennithala contested in assembly poll.

He was a brother in law of Malayalam actor Prem Nazir, having married Nazir's younger sister Suhra.

Basheer died from a heart attack at his home in Vembayam on March 25, 2022, at the age of 77.
