= Bhupinder Singh Thakur =

Retired Indian military general

Lieutenant General Bhupinder Singh Thakur PVSM, AVSM

Vice Chief of the Army Staff
- In office 15 January 2005 – 30 September 2005
- Preceded by: Lt Gen Shantanu Choudhry
- Succeeded by: Lt Gen S. Pattabhiraman

Lieutenant Governor of the Andaman and Nicobar Islands
- In office 29 December 2006 – 30 June 2013
- Appointed by: A. P. J. Abdul Kalam
- Preceded by: Madan Mohan Lakhera
- Succeeded by: A. K. Singh

Lieutenant Governor of Puducherry
- Additional charge
- In office 15 March 2008 – 22 July 2008
- Appointed by: Pratibha Patil
- Chief Minister: N. Rangaswamy
- Preceded by: Mukut Mithi
- Succeeded by: Govind Singh Gurjar

Personal details
- Born: 20 March 1946
- Awards: Param Vishisht Seva Medal; Ati Vishisht Seva Medal

Military service
- Allegiance: India
- Branch/service: Indian Army
- Years of service: 1965–2005
- Rank: Lieutenant General
- Unit: Central India Horse
- Commands: II Corps (India); Director General, Assam Rifles; Military Attaché to East and Southern Africa

Lieutenant General Bhupinder Singh Thakur PVSM, AVSM (born 20 March 1946), or Bhopinder Singh, is a retired officer of the Indian Army who served as the 26th Vice Chief of the Army Staff from January to September 2005. He also served as General Officer Commanding of II Corps, Director General of the Assam Rifles and Lieutenant Governor of The Andaman and Nicobar Islands. He was the former military secretary to president K. R. Narayanan and to President A. P. J. Abdul Kalam. He was the former military, naval and air attaché for East and Southern Africa headquartered at Addis Ababa. He currently resides in Chandigarh in India.

== Early life and education ==
Thakur was born on 20 March 1946. He is an alumnus of the National Defence Academy and was commissioned into the Central India Horse regiment of the Armoured Corps on 27 June 1965.

== Military career ==
Throughout his career, Thakur held various prestigious appointments: Early in his career, he served as the Brigade Major, a key operational staff officer role. He was responsible for planning and coordinating operations in a desert terrain. He served as the Chief of Staff at the Army Training Command, overseeing training doctrines and policies. As the head of the Assam Rifles, he initiated programs addressing health issues like HIV/AIDS among troops and local populations, collaborating with organizations such as UNAIDS and the Assam AIDS Prevention Society. He served as the military, naval, and air attaché for East and Southern Africa, headquartered in Addis Ababa. He was awarded the Ati Vishisht Seva Medal in 2000 and the Param Vishisht Seva Medal in 2004 for distinguished service.

== Vice Chief of the Army Staff ==
Thakur served as the Vice Chief of the Army Staff from 15 January 2005 to 30 September 2005. In this capacity, he was responsible for fine-tuning strategic and operational concepts of the Army and providing impetus to modernization plans.

== Andaman and Nicobar Islands ==
He was the former Lieutenant Governor of the Andaman and Nicobar Islands. Following the resignation of Mukut Mithi as Lieutenant Governor of Puducherry, Singh was appointed to replace him on 13 March 2008 and sworn in on 15 March.

== Post-retirement ==
After retiring in 2005, Thakur remained active in veteran affairs and participated in various events. Notably, in June 2022, he addressed veterans during the conclusion of an Indian Army motorcycle expedition in Manali, commemorating the 60th anniversary of the 21 Sub Area.

In the year 2017, he published his book Bayoneting with Opinions and in 2019 published another book Continuing Opinions in Difficult Times.

== Awards and decorations ==
- Param Vishisht Seva Medal (PVSM)
- Ati Vishisht Seva Medal (AVSM)

Government offices
Preceded by Madan Mohan Lakhera, acting	Lieutenant Governor of the Andaman and Nicobar Islands; 2006—2013	Succeeded by A. K. Singh
