= List of lieutenant governors of the Andaman and Nicobar Islands =

Lieutenant Governor of Andaman and Nicobar Islands
- Emblem of Andaman and Nicobar Islands

- Flag of India

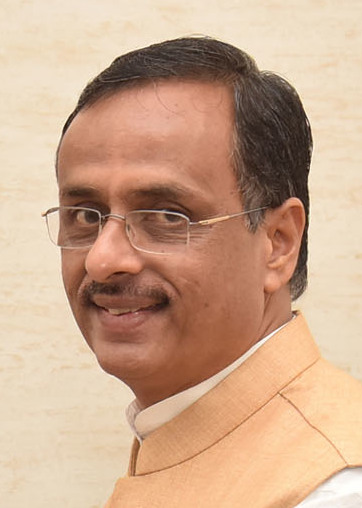
- Incumbent; Dinesh Sharma since 15 September 2026
- Style: The Honourable
- Residence: Lok Niwas, Port Blair
- Appointer: President of India
- Term length: Five Years
- Inaugural holder: Manohar Lal Kampani
- Formation: 12 November 1982; 43 years ago

The Lieutenant Governor of the Andaman and Nicobar Islands is the representative of the Government of India in the Andaman and Nicobar Islands and the head of the union territory.

After independence in 1947, the chief commissioner, and later the lieutenant governor, has been appointed by the President of India. The current lieutenant governor is Dinesh Sharma. His official residence is in Lok Niwas, Port Blair.

== Predecessor ==
=== Superintendents of Port Blair (1858–1872) ===
| # | Name | Took office | Left office | Notes |
|---|---|---|---|---|
| 1 | Henry Stuart Man | 22 January 1858 | 1858 | First time |
| 2 | James Pattison Walker | 1858 | October 1859 | |
| 3 | John Colpoys Haughton | October 1859 | 1862 | |
| 4 | Robert Christopher Tytler | April 1862 | February 1864 | |
| 5 | Barnett Ford | 1864 | 1868 | |
| 6 | Henry Stuart Man | 1868 | 1871 | Second time |
| 7 | Frederick Lyon Playfair | 1871 | 1872 | |

=== Chief Commissioners of the Andaman and Nicobar Islands (1872–1945) ===
| # | Name | Took office | Left office | Notes |
|---|---|---|---|---|
| 1 | Donald Martin Stewart | 1872 | 1875 | |
| 2 | Charles Arthur Barwell | 1875 | 1878 | |
| 3 | Thomas Cadell | 1878 | 1892 | |
| 4 | Norman Mcleod Thomas Horsford | 1892 | 1894 | |
| 5 | Richard Carnac Temple | 1894 | 1904 | |
| 6 | William Rudolph Henry Merk | 1904 | 1906 | |
| 7 | Herbert Arrott Browning | 1906 | 1913 | |
| 8 | Montague William Douglas | 1913 | 1920 | |
| 9 | Henry Cecil Beadon | 1920 | 1923 | |
| 10 | Michael Lloyd Ferrar | 1923 | 1931 | |
| 11 | John William Smith | 1931 | 1935 | |
| 12 | William Alexander Cosgrave | 1935 | 1938 | |
| 13 | Charles Francis Waterfall | 1938 | 23 March 1942 | |
| 14 | Bucho | 23 March 1942 | 1943 | Japanese occupation |
| 15 | A. D. Loganathan | December 1943 | August 1945 | Provisional Government of Azad Hind |

=== Governors of the Andaman and Nicobar Islands (1945–1947) ===
| # | Name | Took office | Left office | Notes |
|---|---|---|---|---|
| 1 | Charles Francis Waterfall | 1945 | 1946 | Restored |
| 2 | Noel Kennedy Patterson | 1946 | 15 August 1947 | |

=== Chief Commissioners of the Andaman and Nicobar Islands (1946 – 1982) ===
Following Indian independence, the Chief Commissioner of the Andaman and Nicobar Islands was the nominal head of the territory, appointed by the President of India.

| # | Name | Image | Took office | Left office |
|---|---|---|---|---|
| 1 | Inamul Majid | | 1946 | 1949 |
| 2 | Ajoy Kumar Ghosh | | 1949 | 1953 |
| 3 | Sankar Nath Maitra | | 1953 | 1956 |
| 4 | C. Ramachandran | | 1956 | 1956 |
| 5 | T. G. N. Ayyar | | 1956 | 1958 |
| 6 | M. V. Rajawade | | 1958 | 1961 |
| 7 | B. N. Maheshwari | | 1961 | 1965 |
| 8 | B. L. Chak | | 1965 | 1966 |
| 9 | Mahabir Singh | | 1966 | 1968 |
| 10 | H. S. Butalia | | 1968 | 1972 |
| 11 | Harmander Singh | | 1972 | 1975 |
| 12 | Surendra Mohan Krishnatry | | 1975 | 1979 |
| 13 | S. L. Sharma | | 1979 | 1982 |

== Lieutenant Governors of the Andaman and Nicobar Islands (1982–present) ==
| # | Portrait | Lieutenant Governor (born–died) | Took office | Left office | Duration | Appointed by |
|---|---|---|---|---|---|---|
| 1 | | Manohar Lal Kampani (1925–2021) | 12 Nov 1982 | 3 Dec 1985 | 3 years, 21 days | Giani Zail Singh |
| 2 | | Lt. Gen. Tirath Singh Oberoi (Retd.) | 4 Dec 1985 | Dec 1989 | Approx. 4 years | Giani Zail Singh |
| 3 | | Romesh Bhandari (1928–2013) | Dec 1989 | 24 Feb 1990 | Approx. 2 months | Ramaswamy Venkataraman |
| 4 | | Lt. Gen. Ranjit Singh Dyal (Retd.) (1928–2012) | 25 Feb 1990 | Dec 1990 | Approx. 9 months | Ramaswamy Venkataraman |
| 5 | | Surjit Singh Barnala (1925–2017) | Dec 1990 | 18 Mar 1993 | Approx. 2 years, 3 months | Ramaswamy Venkataraman |
| 6 | | Vakkom Purushothaman (1928–2023) | 19 Mar 1993 | 18 Mar 1996 | 2 years, 365 days | Shankar Dayal Sharma |
| 7 | | Ishwari Prasad Gupta (1931–2018) | 23 Dec 1996 | 25 May 2001 | 4 years, 153 days | Shankar Dayal Sharma |
| 8 | | Nagendra Nath Jha (1935–2020) | 26 May 2001 | 4 Jan 2004 | 2 years, 223 days | K. R. Narayanan |
| 9 | | Ram Kapse (1933–2015) | 5 Jan 2004 | 30 May 2006 | 2 years, 145 days | A. P. J. Abdul Kalam |
| 10 | | Lt. Gen. Madan Mohan Lakhera (Retd.) (1937–2026) | 12 Feb 2006 | 29 Dec 2006 | 320 days | A. P. J. Abdul Kalam |
| 11 | | Lt. Gen. Bhupinder Singh Thakur (Retd.) (born 1946) | 29 Dec 2006 | 30 Jun 2013 | 6 years, 183 days | A. P. J. Abdul Kalam |
| 12 | | Lt. Gen. A. K. Singh (Retd.) (born 1953) | 8 Jul 2013 | 17 Aug 2016 | 3 years, 40 days | Pranab Mukherjee |
| 13 | | Jagdish Mukhi (born 1942) | 22 Aug 2016 | 7 Oct 2017 | 1 year, 46 days | Pranab Mukherjee |
| 14 | | Adm. Devendra Kumar Joshi (Retd.) (born 1954) | 8 Oct 2017 | 14 Sep 2026 | 8 years, 341 days | Ram Nath Kovind |
| 15 | | Dinesh Sharma (born 1964) | 15 Sep 2026 | Incumbent | 28 days | Droupadi Murmu |

== Oath ==
"I, A. B., do swear in the name of God/solemly affirm that I will faithfully execute the office of Lieutenant Governor (or discharge the functions of the Lieutenant Governor) of .............(name of the Union Territory) and will to the best of my ability preserve, protect and defend the Constitution and the law and that I will devote myself to the service and well-being of the people of ...........(name of the Union Territory)."

== See also ==
- Andaman and Nicobar Islands
- Governors in India
