= N. Kunjuraman =

Indian politician (1906–1980)

Member of the Kerala Legislative Assembly
- In office 1960–1965
- Preceded by: R. Prakasam
- Succeeded by: K. P. K. Das
- Constituency: Attingal

Personal details
- Born: June 1906
- Died: 21 October 1980

N. Kunjuraman (June 1906 – 21 October 1980) was an Indian politician and freedom fighter, who belonged to Indian National Congress. He represented Attingal in the second Kerala Legislative Assembly.

== Political career ==
Kunjuraman was active during the Indian freedom struggle and has been imprisoned six times during participation. He became a member of the Travancore Legislative Assembly in 1948. From 1949–1952, he served as the member of the newly formed Travancore Cochin Legislative Assembly. During this period, he served as the minister for education, co-operation, industry and labour. In 1960, he was elected into the Kerala Legislative Assembly from the Attingal constituency as a member of Indian National Congress. Other than these positions, he was the chairman of Trivandrum District Land Mortgage Bank and Minimum Wages Committee for Coir. He was a member of All India Committee for Development of Coir Industry in India and served as the member and vice chairman of All India Coir Board.
