= Kilimanoor Assembly constituency =

Former constituency of the Kerala legislative assembly in India

Coordinates: 8.77°N 76.88°E

Kilimanoor
- Former constituency for the Kerala Legislative Assembly

Constituency details
- Country: India
- Region: South India
- State: Kerala
- District: Thiruvananthapuram
- Lok Sabha constituency: Chirayinkil
- Established: 1963
- Abolished: 2008
- Reservation: SC

Kilimanoor Assembly constituency was a constituency of the Kerala Legislative Assembly. It consisted of Pazhayakunnummel Pulimath, Kilimanoor Grama Panchayath, Nagaroor, Madavoor, Pallickal, Karavaram, Mudakkal and Navaikulam Panchayats. Adv. N. Rajan was the last representative of this constituency from 2001 to 2006.

== Members of the Legislative Assembly ==
Year	Member	Party
1965	C. K. Balakrishnan	CPI(M)
1967	C. K. Balakrishnan	CPI(M)
1970	P. K. Chathan Master	CPI
1977	P. K. Chathan Master	CPI
1980	Bhargavi Thankappan	CPI
1982	Bhargavi Thankappan	CPI
1987	Bhargavi Thankappan	CPI
1991	N. Rajan	CPI
1996	Bhargavi Thankappan	CPI
2001	N. Rajan	CPI
2006	N. Rajan	CPI
