= Ishwari Prasad Gupta =

Indian civil servant (1931–2012)

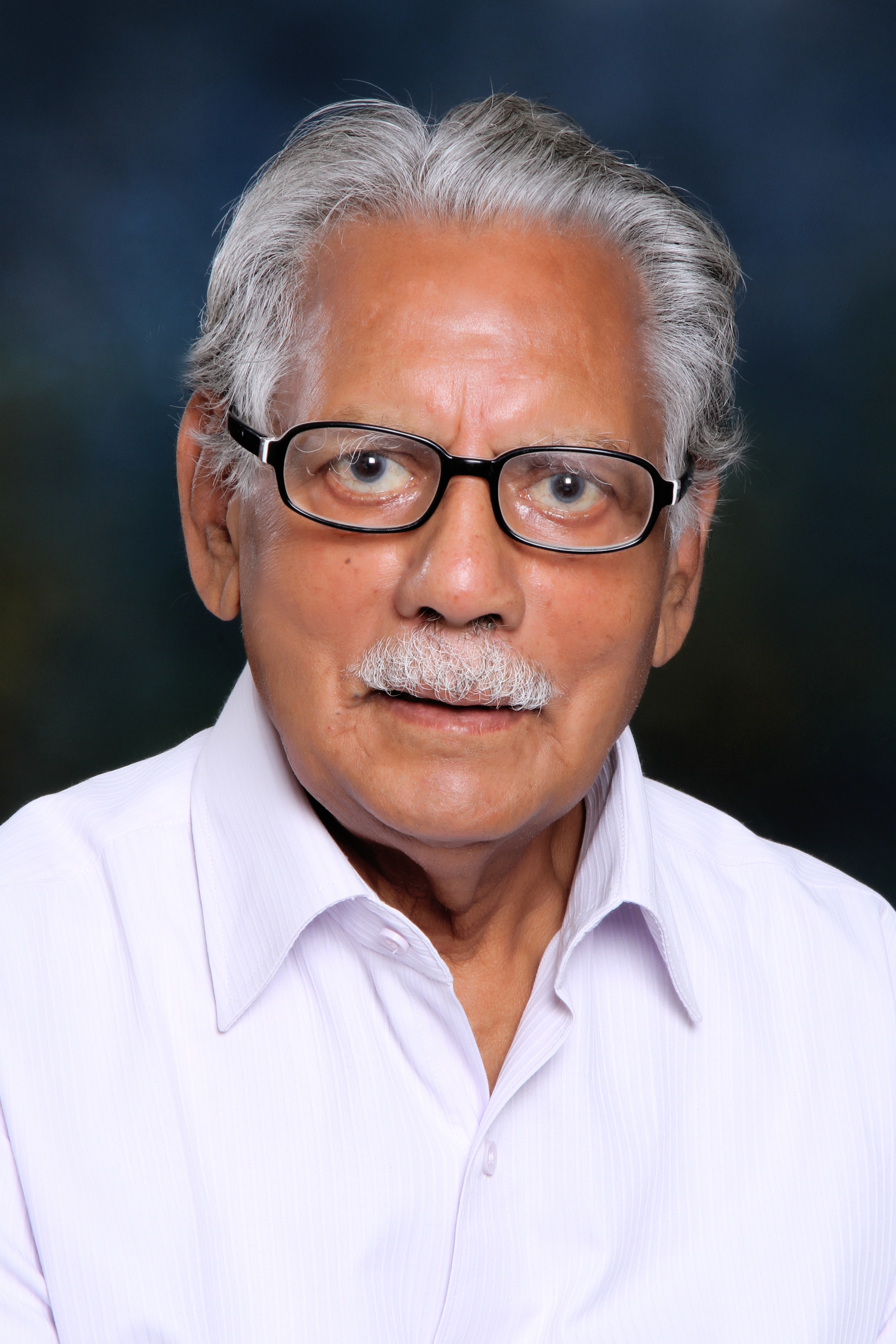
- I.P. Gupta IAS

7th Lieutenant Governor of the Andaman and Nicobar Islands
- In office 23 December 1996 – 25 May 2001
- Preceded by: Vakkom Purushothaman
- Succeeded by: Nagendra Nath Jha

Personal details
- Born: 5 February 1931 Arrah (Bihar), India
- Died: 12 December 2018 (aged 87) New Delhi, India
- Profession: Retired Indian Administrative Service

Ishwari Prasad Gupta (5 February 1931, Arrah - 12 December 2018, Delhi) was a 1958 batch IAS. He had been the Joint Secretary to the Government of India, Ministry of Home Affairs, Chief Secretary to the Government of Tripura and Lt Governor of Andaman and Nicobar Islands.

== Administrative assignments ==
From 1975 to 1976 he remained Hill Commissioner of Manipur. Then he was posted as Chief Secretary to the Government of Arunachal Pradesh in 1976 where he served up to 1981.

From 1981 to 1984 he was assigned the post of Joint Secretary to the Government of India, Ministry of Home Affairs. Looking into his previous performances he was again sent to Tripura to serve as Chief Secretary.

He was Additional Secretary to the Government of India, Ministry of Home affairs from December 1985 to March 1988. Again he was assigned the post of Chief Secretary to Tripura Government.

Later he was Advisor to the Governor of Assam from November 1990 to June 1991. He was made the Member, Central Administrative Tribunal, Principal Bench, New Delhi from June 1991 to February 1993.

== State election commissioner ==
From October 1994 to February 1996 he remained the state election commissioner for Union territories of Andaman and Nicobar Islands, Lakshdweep, Daman and Diu and Dadra and Nagar Haveli.

== Lieutenant governor ==
His last assignment as a diplomat was the Lieutenant governor of Andaman and Nicobar Islands from 23 December 1996 to 25 May 2001.

== Honored by Bangladesh ==
Prime Minister of Bangladesh Sheikh Hasina honored him recently on 27 March 2012 at Dhaka. She expressed her sincere gratitude and respect to all the foreign friends of Bangladesh who were honored this day along with Gupta, for their invaluable contributions in the Liberation War of Bangladesh as well as for their unflinching support.

== Works ==
Some of his published articles in English language are:

- Article 371A: Implications
- Humane Touch
- TNV Accord - an assessment
- Evolution of N-E States
- Repatriating the Chakmas

Government offices
Preceded by Vakkom Purushothaman	Lieutenant Governor of the Andaman and Nicobar Islands; 1996–2001	Succeeded by Nagendra Nath Jha
