= Attingal Lok Sabha constituency =

Lok Sabha Constituency in Kerala

Coordinates: 8.6800°N 76.8300°E

Attingal KL-19
- Lok Sabha constituency
- Attingal Lok Sabha constituency

Constituency details
- Country: India
- Region: South India
- State: Kerala
- Assembly constituencies: Varkala; Attingal; Chirayinkeezhu; Nedumangad; Vamanapuram; Aruvikkara; Kattakada
- Established: 2009
- Reservation: None

Member of Parliament
- 18th Lok Sabha
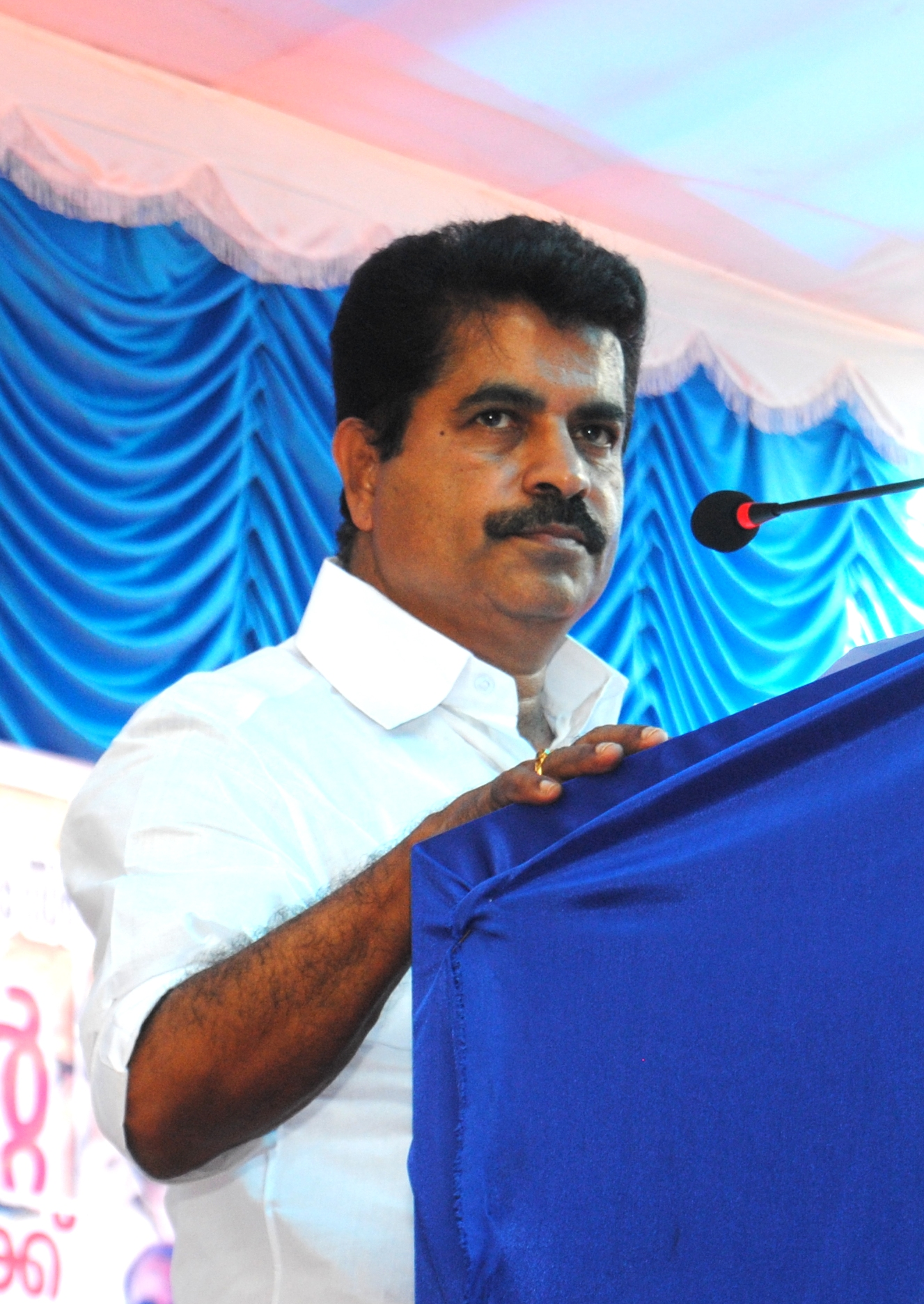
- Incumbent Adoor Prakash
- Party: INC
- Alliance: UDF
- Elected year: 2024

Attingal Lok Sabha constituency is one of the 20 Lok Sabha constituencies in Kerala state in southern India. This constituency came into existence in 2008 following the delimitation of the parliamentary constituencies based on the recommendation of the Delimitation Commission of India constituted in 2002.

== Assembly segments ==
Attingal Lok Sabha constituency is composed of the following assembly segments:

| No | Name | District | Member | Party | 2024 Lead |
|---|---|---|---|---|---|
| 127 | Varkala | Thiruvananthapuram | V. Joy | CPI(M) | CPI(M) |
| 128 | Attingal (SC) | Thiruvananthapuram | O. S. Ambika | CPI(M) | BJP |
| 129 | Chirayinkeezhu (SC) | Thiruvananthapuram | Ramya Haridas | INC | INC |
| 130 | Nedumangad | Thiruvananthapuram | G. R. Anil | CPI | INC |
| 131 | Vamanapuram | Thiruvananthapuram | Sudheersha Palode | INC | INC |
| 136 | Aruvikkara | Thiruvananthapuram | G. Steephen | CPI(M) | INC |
| 138 | Kattakkada | Thiruvananthapuram | M. R. Baiju | INC | BJP |

== Members of Parliament ==
As Chirayinkil

| Election | Lok Sabha | Member | Party | Tenure |
|---|---|---|---|---|
Travancore-Cochin
| 1952 | 1st | V. Parameswaran Nayar | United Front of Leftists | 1952-1967 |
After the Formation of Kerala
| 1957 | 2nd | M. K. Kumaran | Communist Party of India | 1957-1962 |
| 1962 | 3rd | M. K. Kumaran | Communist Party of India | 1962-1967 |
| 1967 | 4th | K. Anirudhan | Communist Party of India | 1967-1971 |
| 1971 | 5th | Vayalar Ravi | Indian National Congress | 1971-1977 |
| 1977 | 6th | Vayalar Ravi | Indian National Congress | 1977-1980 |
| 1980 | 7th | A.A. Rahim | Indian National Congress (I) | 1980-1984 |
| 1984 | 8th | Thalekunnil Basheer | Indian National Congress (I) | 1984-1989 |
| 1989 | 9th | Thalekunnil Basheer | Indian National Congress (I) | 1989-1991 |
| 1991 | 10th | Susheela Gopalan | Communist Party of India (Marxist) | 1991-1996 |
| 1996 | 11th | A. Sampath | Communist Party of India (Marxist) | 1996-1998 |
| 1998 | 12th | Varkala Radhakrishnan | Communist Party of India (Marxist) | 1998-1999 |
| 1999 | 13th | Varkala Radhakrishnan | Communist Party of India (Marxist) | 1999-2004 |
| 2004 | 14th | Varkala Radhakrishnan | Communist Party of India (Marxist) | 2004-2009 |

As Attingal

| Election | Lok Sabha | Member | Party | Tenure |
|---|---|---|---|---|
| 2009 | 15th | A. Sampath | Communist Party of India (Marxist) | 2009-2014 |
| 2014 | 16th | A. Sampath | Communist Party of India (Marxist) | 2014-2019 |
| 2019 | 17th | Adoor Prakash | Indian National Congress | 2019-2024 |
| 2024 | 18th | Adoor Prakash | Indian National Congress | Incumbent |

== Election results ==
Vote share of Winning candidates
| 2024 | 33.29% |
| 2019 | 38.34% |
| 2014 | 45.67% |
| 2009 | 45.37% |
| 2004 | 46.90% |
| 1999 | 44.80% |
| 1998 | 46.20% |
| 1996 | 48.53% |
| 1991 | 47.86% |
| 1989 | 48.16% |
| 1984 | 50.67% |
| 1980 | 48.01% |
| 1977 | 57.33% |
| 1971 | 57.54% |
| 1967 | 52.38% |
| 1962 | 55.45% |
| 1957 | 52.54% |

=== General Elections 2029 ===
2029 Indian general election: Attingal
| Party | Candidate | Votes | % | ±% |
|---|---|---|---|---|
| UDF | | | | |
| LDF | | | | |
| NDA | | | | |
| NOTA | None of the above | | | |
| Margin of victory | | | | |
| Turnout | | | | |
| | | Swing | | |

=== General Election 2024 ===
2024 Indian general election: Attingal
| Party | Candidate | Votes | % | ±% |
|---|---|---|---|---|
| INC | Adoor Prakash | 328,051 | 33.29 | −5.05 |
| CPI(M) | V. Joy | 327,367 | 33.22 | −1.28 |
| BJP | V. Muraleedharan | 311,779 | 31.64 | +6.67 |
| NOTA | None of the above | 9,791 | 1.01 | +0.44 |
| Majority | | 684 | 0.07 | −3.77 |
| Turnout | | 986,917 | 70.44 | −4.04 |
| INC hold | | Swing | -5.05 | |

By Assembly Segments
| No. | Status (Assembly Constituency) | Votes | | | Lead |
| No. | Status (Assembly Constituency) | INC (UDF) | CPI(M) (LDF) | BJP (NDA) | Lead |
|---|---|---|---|---|---|
| 127 | Varkala | 39,806 | 45,930 | 40,816 | 5,114 |
| 128 | Attingal (SC) | 42,006 | 46,161 | 52,448 | 6,287 |
| 129 | Chirayinkeezhu (SC) | 47,695 | 44,874 | 42,929 | 2,821 |
| 130 | Nedumangad | 50,437 | 50,042 | 45,180 | 395 |
| 131 | Vamanapuram | 50,667 | 45,617 | 40,170 | 5,050 |
| 136 | Aruvikkara | 49,607 | 47,375 | 38,333 | 2,232 |
| 138 | Kattakkada | 43,055 | 41,716 | 47,834 | 4,779 |

=== General Elections 2019 ===
2019 Indian general election : Attingal
| Party | Candidate | Votes | % | ±% |
|---|---|---|---|---|
| INC | Adoor Prakash | 380,995 | 38.34 | −0.75 |
| CPI(M) | A. Sampath | 3,42,748 | 34.50 | −11.18 |
| BJP | Sobha Surendran | 2,48,081 | 24.97 | +14.43 |
| NOTA | None of the Above | 5,685 | 0.57 | −0.23 |
| Independent | Sunil Soman | 5,433 | 0.55 | |
| SDPI | Ajamal Ismail | 5,429 | 0.55 | −0.76 |
| Margin of victory | | 38,247 | 3.85 | −4.22 |
| Turnout | | 9,93,614 | 74.48 | 4.89 |
| Registered electors | | 13,50,710 | | 7.94 |
| INC gain from CPI(M) | | Swing | -7.33 | |

By Assembly Segments
| No. | Status (Assembly Constituency) | Votes | | | Lead |
| No. | Status (Assembly Constituency) | INC (UDF) | CPI(M) (LDF) | BJP (NDA) | Lead |
|---|---|---|---|---|---|
| 127 | Varkala | 48,019 | 42,335 | 34,343 | 5,684 |
| 128 | Attingal (SC) | 50,045 | 48,492 | 42,389 | 1,553 |
| 129 | Chirayinkeezhu (SC) | 56,314 | 47,750 | 32,829 | 2,821 |
| 130 | Nedumangad | 54,506 | 55,265 | 36,417 | 759 |
| 131 | Vamanapuram | 59,671 | 50,231 | 29,681 | 9,440 |
| 136 | Aruvikkara | 58,952 | 50,403 | 30,151 | 8,549 |
| 138 | Kattakkada | 51,962 | 45,822 | 40,692 | 6,140 |

=== General Elections 2014 ===
2014 Indian general election : Attingal
| Party | Candidate | Votes | % | ±% |
|---|---|---|---|---|
| CPI(M) | A. Sampath | 392,478 | 45.67 | 0.30 |
| INC | Bindhu Krishna | 3,23,100 | 37.60 | −5.23 |
| BJP | S. Girija Kumari | 90,528 | 10.53 | 3.95 |
| SDPI | M. K. Manoj Kumar | 11,225 | 1.31 | |
| BSP | K. S. Anil Kumar | 8,586 | 1.00 | −1.15 |
| NOTA | None of the Above | 6,924 | 0.81 | |
| SS | Vakkom G. Ajith | 5,511 | 0.64 | |
| WPOI | Priya Sunil | 4,862 | 0.57 | |
| Independent | K. S. Hariharan | 4,064 | 0.47 | |
| Independent | Sunil Krishnan | 3,850 | 0.45 | |
| Margin of victory | | 69,378 | 8.07 | 5.54 |
| Turnout | | 8,59,350 | 68.67 | 2.42 |
| Registered electors | | 12,51,398 | | 14.66 |
| CPI(M) hold | | Swing | 0.30 | |

By Assembly Segments
| No. | Status (Assembly Constituency) | Votes | | | Lead |
| No. | Status (Assembly Constituency) | CPI(M) (LDF) | INC (UDF) | BJP (NDA) | Lead |
|---|---|---|---|---|---|
| 127 | Varkala | 50,382 | 41,369 | 10,219 | 9,013 |
| 128 | Attingal (SC) | 64,215 | 43,260 | 11,587 | 20,955 |
| 129 | Chirayinkeezhu (SC) | 59,186 | 47,704 | 8,377 | 11,482 |
| 130 | Nedumangad | 59,283 | 45,769 | 15,304 | 13,514 |
| 131 | Vamanapuram | 56,922 | 51,226 | 11,207 | 5,696 |
| 136 | Aruvikkara | 52,000 | 47,837 | 14,890 | 4,163 |
| 138 | Kattakkada | 49,358 | 44,375 | 18,811 | 4,983 |

=== General Elections 2009 ===
2009 Indian general election : Attingal
| Party | Candidate | Votes | % | ±% |
|---|---|---|---|---|
| CPI(M) | Anirudhan Sampath | 328,036 | 45.37 | |
| INC | Prof. G. Balachandran | 3,09,695 | 42.83 | |
| BJP | Thottakkadu Sasi | 47,620 | 6.59 | |
| BSP | J. Sudhakaran | 15,558 | 2.15 | |
| Independent | Sajimon | 5,217 | 0.72 | |
| SS | Sreenath | 4,968 | 0.69 | |
| Independent | M. Saifudeen | 4,228 | 0.58 | |
| Margin of victory | | 18,341 | 2.54 | |
| Turnout | | 7,23,045 | 66.26 | |
| Registered electors | | 10,91,432 | | |
| CPI(M) win (new seat) | | | | |

=== General Elections 2004 ===
2004 Indian general election : Attingal
| Party | Candidate | Votes | % | ±% |
|---|---|---|---|---|
| CPI(M) | Varkala Radhakrishnan | 313,615 | 46.9 | |
| INC | M.I. Shanavas | 262,870 | 39.3 | |
| BJP | Padmakumar | 71,982 | 10.8 | |
| Margin of victory | | 50,745 | 7.6 | |
| Turnout | | 6,68,280 | 65.5 | |
| Registered electors | | 10,20,604 | | |
| CPI(M) hold | | Swing | | |

=== General Elections 1999 ===
1999 Indian general election : Attingal
| Party | Candidate | Votes | % | ±% |
|---|---|---|---|---|
| CPI(M) | Varkala Radhakrishnan | 309,304 | 44.8 | |
| INC | M.I. Shanavas | 306,176 | 44.3 | |
| BJP | Padmakumar | 63,889 | 9.2 | |
| Margin of victory | | 3,128 | 0.5 | |
| Turnout | | 6,91,113 | 63.0 | |
| Registered electors | | 10,96,417 | | |
| CPI(M) hold | | Swing | | |

=== General Elections 1998 ===
1998 Indian general election : Attingal
| Party | Candidate | Votes | % | ±% |
|---|---|---|---|---|
| CPI(M) | Varkala Radhakrishnan | 321,479 | 46.2 | |
| INC | M.M. Hassan | 313,937 | 45.1 | |
| BJP | T.M. Viswambharan | 47,249 | 6.8 | |
| Margin of victory | | 7,542 | 1.1 | |
| Turnout | | 6,95,722 | 65.68 | |
| Registered electors | | 10,56,903 | | |
| CPI(M) hold | | Swing | | |

=== General Elections 1996 ===
1996 Indian general election : Attingal
| Party | Candidate | Votes | % | ±% |
|---|---|---|---|---|
| CPI(M) | Anirudhan Sampath | 330,079 | 48.53 | 0.67 |
| INC | Thalekunnil Basheer | 2,81,996 | 41.46 | −6.24 |
| BJP | R. Radhakrishnan Unnithan | 30,348 | 4.46 | 1.55 |
| PDP | Pulipara Biju | 11,963 | 1.76 | |
| Independent | Suseela Rajan | 7,807 | 1.15 | |
| Independent | Devadathan | 3,298 | 0.48 | |
| Independent | Sebastian | 3,290 | 0.48 | |
| Margin of victory | | 48,083 | 7.07 | 6.91 |
| Turnout | | 6,80,181 | 67.22 | −2.51 |
| Registered electors | | 10,35,445 | | 3.20 |
| CPI(M) hold | | Swing | 0.67 | |

=== General Elections 1991 ===
1991 Indian general election : Attingal
| Party | Candidate | Votes | % | ±% |
|---|---|---|---|---|
| CPI(M) | Susheela Gopalan | 331,518 | 47.86 | 0.41 |
| INC | Thalekunnil Basheer | 3,30,412 | 47.70 | −0.46 |
| BJP | K. K. R. Kumar | 20,159 | 2.91 | −0.27 |
| Margin of victory | | 1,106 | 0.16 | −0.55 |
| Turnout | | 6,92,666 | 69.73 | −4.48 |
| Registered electors | | 10,03,307 | | 1.95 |
| CPI(M) gain from INC | | Swing | -0.30 | |

=== General Elections 1989 ===
1989 Indian general election : Attingal
| Party | Candidate | Votes | % | ±% |
|---|---|---|---|---|
| INC | Thalekunnil Basheer | 349,068 | 48.16 | −2.51 |
| CPI(M) | Susheela Gopalan | 3,43,938 | 47.45 | 2.77 |
| BJP | V. N. Gopalakrishnan Nair | 23,049 | 3.18 | |
| JP | D. Sanjeev | 3,500 | 0.48 | |
| Margin of victory | | 5,130 | 0.71 | −5.28 |
| Turnout | | 7,24,825 | 74.21 | 1.24 |
| Registered electors | | 9,84,118 | | 35.16 |
| INC hold | | Swing | -2.51 | |

=== General Elections 1984 ===
1984 Indian general election : Attingal
| Party | Candidate | Votes | % | ±% |
|---|---|---|---|---|
| INC | Thalekunnil Basheer | 266,230 | 50.67 | |
| CPI(M) | K. Sudhakaran | 2,34,765 | 44.68 | |
| Independent | Vattappara Das | 10,870 | 2.07 | |
| Independent | Bharathanoor Das | 2,989 | 0.57 | |
| Independent | Basheer | 2,765 | 0.53 | |
| Independent | Pattom Jayachandran | 2,567 | 0.49 | |
| Margin of victory | | 31,465 | 5.99 | 4.42 |
| Turnout | | 5,25,386 | 72.97 | 13.85 |
| Registered electors | | 7,28,111 | | 10.20 |
| INC gain from INC(I) | | Swing | 2.66 | |

=== General Elections 1980 ===
1980 Indian general election : Attingal
| Party | Candidate | Votes | % | ±% |
|---|---|---|---|---|
| INC(I) | A. A. Rahim | 185,596 | 48.01 | |
| INC(U) | Vayalar Ravi | 1,79,533 | 46.45 | |
| Independent | K. P. Vijayan | 14,345 | 3.71 | |
| Independent | Sreenivasan | 4,156 | 1.08 | |
| Independent | Varkala Balam | 2,915 | 0.75 | |
| Margin of victory | | 6,063 | 1.57 | −13.09 |
| Turnout | | 3,86,545 | 59.12 | −16.34 |
| Registered electors | | 6,60,715 | | 17.14 |
| INC(I) gain from INC | | Swing | -9.32 | |

=== General Elections 1977 ===
1977 Indian general election : Attingal
| Party | Candidate | Votes | % | ±% |
|---|---|---|---|---|
| INC | Vayalar Ravi | 238,253 | 57.33 | −0.21 |
| CPI(M) | K. Anirudhan | 1,77,328 | 42.67 | 0.67 |
| Margin of victory | | 60,925 | 14.66 | −0.88 |
| Turnout | | 4,15,581 | 75.46 | 11.79 |
| Registered electors | | 5,64,054 | | 12.20 |
| INC hold | | Swing | -0.21 | |

=== General Elections 1971 ===
1971 Indian general election : Attingal
| Party | Candidate | Votes | % | ±% |
|---|---|---|---|---|
| INC | Vayalar Ravi | 182,431 | 57.54 | 14.95 |
| CPI(M) | V. Radhakrishnan | 1,33,159 | 42.00 | −10.38 |
| Independent | V. Sudevan | 1,463 | 0.46 | |
| Margin of victory | | 49,272 | 15.54 | 5.75 |
| Turnout | | 3,17,053 | 63.67 | −11.80 |
| Registered electors | | 5,02,730 | | 22.38 |
| INC gain from CPI(M) | | Swing | 5.16 | |

=== General Elections 1967 ===
1967 Indian general election : Attingal
| Party | Candidate | Votes | % | ±% |
|---|---|---|---|---|
| CPI(M) | K. Anirudhan | 157,040 | 52.38 | |
| INC | R. Sankar | 1,27,697 | 42.59 | −1.95 |
| PSP | M. A. Sastry | 15,072 | 5.03 | |
| Margin of victory | | 29,343 | 9.79 | −1.12 |
| Turnout | | 2,99,809 | 75.47 | 4.16 |
| Registered electors | | 4,10,807 | | −6.03 |
| CPI(M) gain from CPI | | Swing | -3.07 | |

=== General Elections 1962 ===
1962 Indian general election : Attingal
| Party | Candidate | Votes | % | ±% |
|---|---|---|---|---|
| CPI | M. K. Kumaran | 168,927 | 55.45 | 2.91 |
| INC | Shahul Hameed | 1,35,708 | 44.55 | 26.53 |
| Margin of victory | | 33,219 | 10.90 | −23.62 |
| Turnout | | 3,04,635 | 71.31 | 2.71 |
| Registered electors | | 4,37,189 | | 11.82 |
| CPI hold | | Swing | 2.91 | |

=== General Elections 1957 ===
1957 Indian general election : Attingal
| Party | Candidate | Votes | % | ±% |
|---|---|---|---|---|
| CPI | M. K. Kumaran | 140,930 | 52.54 | |
| INC | Madhavan | 48,329 | 18.02 | |
| PSP | Ahmed Hussain | 43,261 | 16.13 | |
| RSP | Balakrishnan | 35,702 | 13.31 | |
| Margin of victory | | 92,601 | 34.52 | |
| Turnout | | 2,68,222 | 68.60 | |
| Registered electors | | 3,90,978 | | |
| CPI win (new seat) | | | | |

== See also ==
- List of constituencies of the Lok Sabha
- 2014 Indian general election in Kerala
- 2014 Indian general election
