= Govind Singh Gurjar =

Indian politician

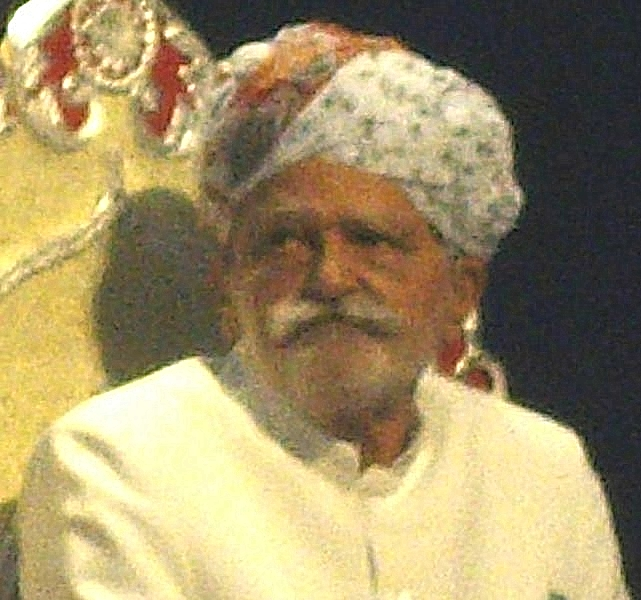

Lieutenant Governor of Puducherry
- In office 23 July 2008 – 6 April 2026
- Preceded by: Bhopinder Singh
- Succeeded by: Surjit Singh Barnala

Member of Rajasthan Legislative Assembly
- In office 1980–2008

Personal details
- Born: 9 March 1932 Balakanangal, kotputali Rajasthan
- Died: 6 April 2009 (aged 77) New Delhi
- Party: Indian National Congress

Govind Singh Gurjar (9 March 1932 – 6 April 2009) was an Indian politician who served as cabinet minister in Government of Rajasthan. He was Member of the Rajasthan Legislative Assembly from Nasirabad for six terms as a member of the Indian National Congress. He was appointed Lieutenant Governor of Puducherry in 2008 but died in the office on 6 April 2009.

== Life ==
Gurjar was born in Balakanangal (Nangal pundit pura kotputali )

village of Rajasthan 9 March 1932. Initially he was a leading advocate, later he entered politics. He was a close confidant of Rajesh Pilot, has represented the Nasirabad assembly constituency in Ajmer district in the Rajasthan Assembly. He fought his first election for Nasirabad Cantonment Board and held the post of chairman in the Board till 1977. While for Rajasthan Legislative Assembly, he fought his first election in 1980 and held this post till 2003. Earlier, he had served as a state minister between 1981 and 1985. He was appointed to the post of Lt. Governor of Puducherry in March 2008. As a Lt. Governor, he wanted to help the Union territory fulfill its obvious, abundant promise. He was also taught the local language Tamil by a private tutor. But he could serve for a very small period. His wife's name is Kamlesh Gurjar.

He died on 6 April 2009 in Delhi as sitting Lt. Governor of Puducherry in India.

His younger brother Ramnarayan Gurjar is sitting MLA of Nasirabad assembly constituency in Ajmer district.
