= Ram Kapse =

Indian politician

Lt Governor of Andaman and Nicobar Islands
- In office 5 January 2004 – 11 February 2006
- Preceded by: Nagendra Nath Jha
- Succeeded by: Madan Mohan Lakhera

Member of the Rajya Sabha
- In office 27 September 1996 – 4 July 1998

Member of the Lok Sabha
- In office 1989–1996
- Succeeded by: Prakash Paranjape
- Constituency: Thane

Member of the Maharashtra Legislative Assembly
- In office 1978–1989
- Constituency: Kalyan

Personal details
- Born: 1 December 1933 Nashik, British India (present-day Maharashtra, India)
- Died: 25 September 2015 (aged 81) Mumbai, India
- Spouse: Smita Kapse
- Children: 3
- Education: University of Bombay (MA; LLB)

Kapse Ramchandra Ganesh (1 December 1933 – 29 September 2015) was an Indian politician who served as the lieutenant governor of the Andaman and Nicobar Islands from 2004 to 2006. He also served in the Maharashtra Legislative Assembly from 1978 to 1989, Lok Sabha from 1989 to 1996, and Rajya Sabha from 1996 to 1998. He was a member of the Bharatiya Janata Party and led it in the legislative assembly.

== Early life and education ==
Ram Kapse was born in Nashik, on 1 December 1933, to Shri Ganesh Trymbak Kapse. He graduated from the University of Bombay with a Masters of Arts and Bachelor of Laws degrees.

== Career ==
Kapse served in the Maharashtra Legislative Assembly from 1978 to 1989, representing the Kalyan district. During his tenure he was a member of the Estimates, Public Accounts, Public Undertakings, Business Advisory, and Library committees. He was the leader of the Bharatiya Janata Party (BJP) in the assembly.

Kapse was elected to the Lok Sabha in the 1989 election representing the Thane Lok Sabha constituency and reelected in 1991. During his tenure he served on the Business Advisory, Welfare of Scheduled Castes and Schedules Tribes, and Consultative committees. He was chair of the Food, Civil Supplies and Public Distribution committee from 1993 to 1994. He served in the Rajya Sabha from 1996 to 1998.

Kapse served as the lieutenant governor of the Andaman and Nicobar Islands from 2004 to 2006. He oversaw the relief work following the 2004 Indian Ocean earthquake and tsunami.

== Personal life ==
Kapse married Smita, with whom he had three children, on 18 May 1962. He died in Mumbai on 29 September 2015.

== Electoral history ==
Electoral history of Kurt Wright
Year	Office	Party	Election			Result	Ref.
Year	Office	Party	Total	%	P.	Result	Ref.
1985	Maharashtra Legislative Assembly (Kalyan)	Bharatiya Janata Party	44,133	43.23%	1st	Won	
1989	Lok Sabha (Thane)	Bharatiya Janata Party	467,892	55.21%	1st	Won	
1989	Lok Sabha (Thane)	Bharatiya Janata Party	302,928	52.45%	1st	Won	

== Works cited ==
=== News ===
- "Senior BJP leader Ram Kapse passes away". The Times of India. 29 September 2015. Archived from the original on 8 November 2020.

=== Web ===
- "Prof. Ram Kapse passes away, LG condoles death". The Daily Telegrams. 29 September 2015. Archived from the original on 8 November 2026.
- "Rajya Sabha Members Biographical Sketches 1952-2003". Lok Sabha. Archived from the original on 28 December 2021.
- "Statistical Report on General Election, 1985 to the Legislative Assembly of Maharashtra" (PDF). Election Commission of India. Archived (PDF) from the original on 27 January 2013.
- "Statistical Report on General Elections, 1989 to the Ninth Lok Sabha". Election Commission of India. Archived from the original on 6 August 2025.
- "Statistical Report on General Elections, 1991 to the Tenth Lok Sabha" (PDF). Election Commission of India. Archived (PDF) from the original on 8 November 2026.
- "Tenth Lok Sabha Members Bioprofile" (PDF). Rajya Sabha. Archived from the original (PDF) on 22 January 2022.

Government offices
Preceded by Nagendra Nath Jha	Lieutenant Governor of the Andaman and Nicobar Islands; 2004–2006	Succeeded by Madan Mohan Lakhera, acting
