= Lok Niwas, Port Blair =

Residence of the Governor of Andamans & Nicobar Islands

- Interactive map of the Lok Niwas, Port Blair area

General information
- Coordinates: 11.665155°N 92.745005°E
- Current tenants: Dinesh Sharma
- Owner: Andaman and Nicobar Islands Administration

Lok Niwas formerly Raj Niwas (translation: Government Abode) is the official residence of the Lieutenant Governor of the Andaman and Nicobar Islands. It is located in the capital city of Port Blair, Andaman and Nicobar Islands. In February 2018, the Raj Niwas in Port Blair was opened for tourists for the first time.

In October 2024, an Andaman BJP MP, Bishnu Pada Ray, sat in front of Raj Niwas in protest demanding removal of the Lieutenant Governor for failing to take up development activities in the island.

== See also ==
- List of official residences of India
