= Charles Francis Waterfall =

Sir Charles Francis Waterfall, CSI, CIE (24 February 1888 – 23 October 1954) was a British administrator in India. A member of the Indian Civil Service, he served as Chief Commissioner of the Andaman and Nicobar Islands from 1938 to 1942, when the islands were captured by the Japanese. He was held in Japanese captivity until 1945. He was knighted in 1946 and retired two years later.

After the Japanese capture of the Andaman Islands on 23 March 1942, the authorities in British India lost contact with and information about Waterfall; a public statement by British Indian authorities openly worried about the governor's welfare and noted that the authors did not know whether Waterfall was 'dead or alive'.
