= Raja Ravi Varma Art gallery =

Art gallery in Kerala

Raja Ravi Varma Art gallery is set up by the Kerala Lalithakala Akademi at Kilimanoor, the birthplace of the renowned painter Raja Ravi Varma.It displays nearly 50 paintings of Raja Ravi Varma.It is now permanently closed.
