= Anirudhan Sampath =

Indian politician

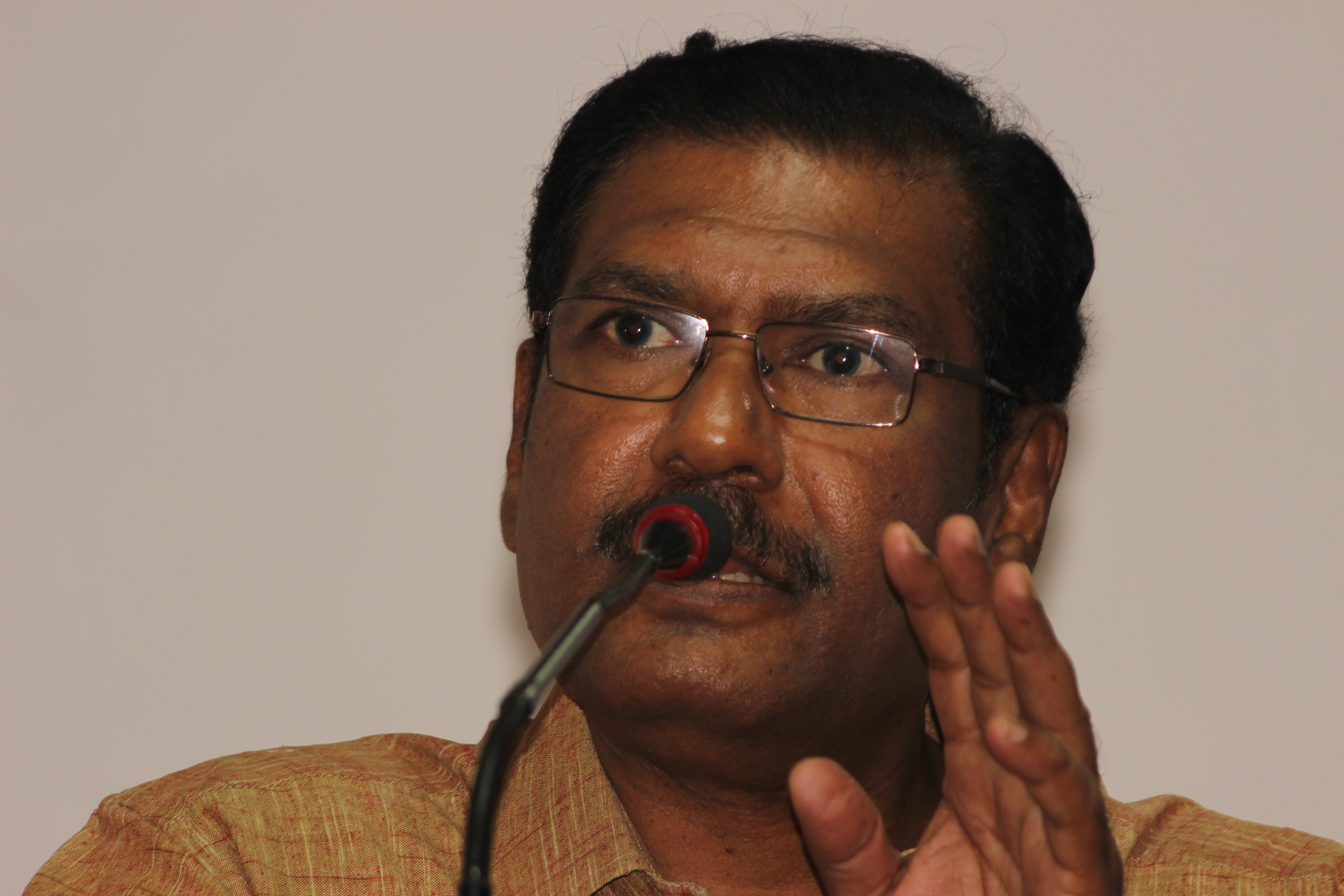
- Dr A. Sampath

Member of Parliament, Lok Sabha
- In office 16 May 2009 – 23 May 2019
- Preceded by: constituency established
- Succeeded by: Adoor Prakash
- Constituency: Attingal
- In office 9 May 1996 – 5 March 1998
- Preceded by: Susheela Gopalan
- Succeeded by: Varkala Radhakrishnan
- Constituency: Chirayinkil

Personal details
- Born: 22 July 1962 (age 63) Trivandrum, Kerala
- Party: Communist Party of India (Marxist)
- Children: 2
- As of 16 September, 2006

Anirudhan Sampath (born 22 July 1962) is an Indian politician and was a member of the 16th Lok Sabha of India. He represented the Attingal constituency of Kerala and is a member of the Communist Party of India (Marxist) (CPI(M)) political party. In 2014 he was elected as M.P. from Attingal for the third time. He is the son of the late Communist party leader and former MP K. Aniruddhan. Sampath is married and has a daughter, Aswathy Sampath. He is related to the Communist Party Leader A.K. Gopalan. In 2019 Indian general election, he lost to Adoor Prakash.

His brother, Anirudhan Kasturi, is competing for the Bharatiya Janata Party for the 2025 Thiruvananthapuram Corporation election.
