= A. K. Singh =

Indian Army officer

Ajay Kumar Singh
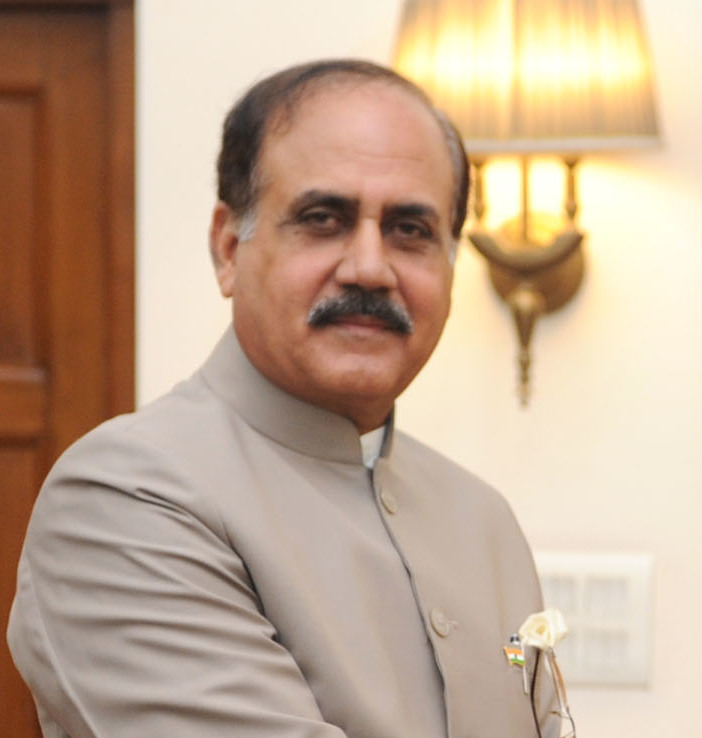

Lieutenant Governor of the Andaman and Nicobar Islands
- In office 8 July 2013 – 17 August 2016
- Preceded by: Bhopinder Singh
- Succeeded by: Jagdish Mukhi

Lieutenant Governor of Puducherry
- In office 18 July 2014 – 29 May 2016
- Preceded by: Virendra Kataria
- Succeeded by: Kiran Bedi

Personal details
- Born: 11 January 1953 (age 72)

Lieutenant General Ajay Kumar Singh, PVSM, AVSM, SM, VSM is the former Lieutenant Governor of Andaman and Nicobar Islands. He is an alumnus of Sainik School Rewa and National Defence Academy. He is former General Officer Commanding-in-Chief of Southern Command of Indian Army.

Singh was named 11th Lieutenant Governor of Andaman and Nicobar Islands in July 2013 and took office on 8 July 2013. He was given additional responsibility of the administration of Puducherry from July 2014 to May 2016.

Singh is known for his contributions towards Andaman Society by starting Andaman's first medical College, ANIIMS and second degree college of South Andaman, ANCOL.

Singh left the Andaman and Nicobar Islands after handing over charges on 19 August 2016.

A.K. Singh was appointed as independent director to Air Works.

== Awards and decorations ==

Param Vishisht Seva Medal	Ati Vishisht Seva Medal	Sena Medal	Vishisht Seva Medal
Operation Vijay Medal	Operation Parakram Medal	Sainya Seva Medal	High Altitude Service Medal
50th Independence Anniversary Medal	30 Years Long Service Medal	20 Years Long Service Medal	9 Years Long Service Medal

Government offices
Preceded by Bhopinder Singh	Lieutenant Governor of Andaman and Nicobar; 2013–2016	Succeeded by Jagdish Mukhi
