= Virendra Kataria =

Indian politician (1931–2019)

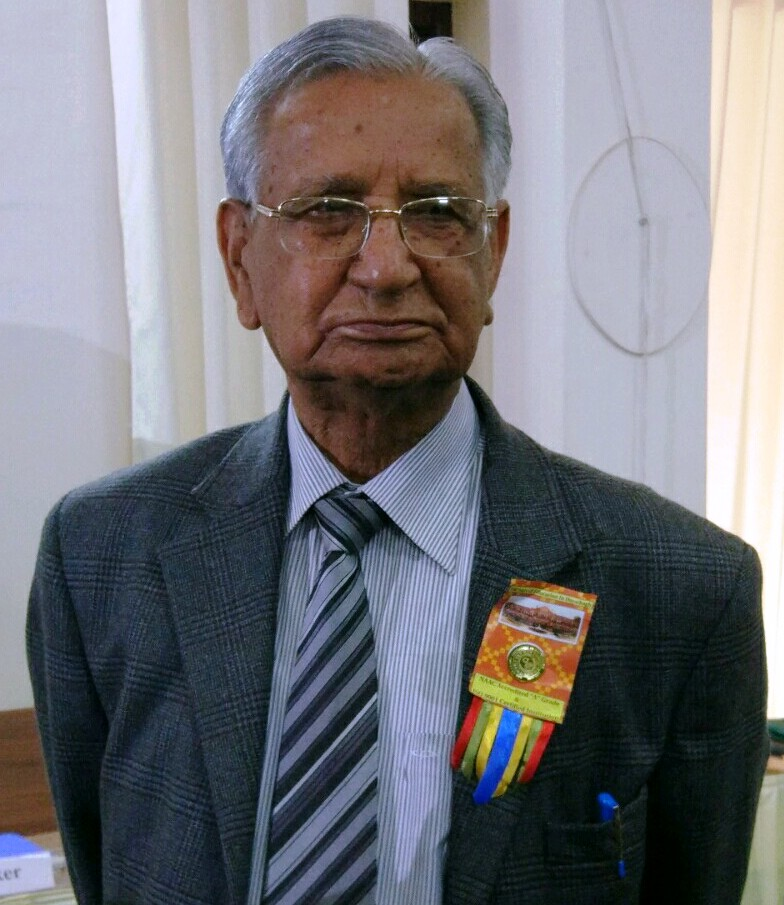

Lieutenant Governor of Puducherry
- In office July 2013 – July 2014
- Preceded by: Iqbal Singh
- Succeeded by: A. K. Singh

Member, Rajya Sabha
- In office 5 July 1992 – 4 July 1998

Personal details
- Born: 20 April 1931
- Died: 5 March 2019 (aged 87)
- Party: Indian National Congress

Virendra Kataria (20 April 1931 – 5 March 2019) was the Lieutenant Governor of Puducherry, India. He was a member of Rajya Sabha from Punjab during his tenure from 5 July 1992 till 4 July 1998. He remained general secretary and was subsequently President of the Indian National Congress in Punjab. He belonged to Abohar, Punjab. He played a vital role in Indian politics and was associated with Indian National Congress throughout his life. He was also local chairman of DAV College of Education, Abohar, Punjab (Under DAV CMC, New Delhi). He died in AIIMS New Delhi on 4 March 2019 at the age of 88.
