= S. Pattabhiraman (general) =

Indian military general (1946–2025)

Lieutenant General S. Pattabhiraman PVSM, AVSM, SM, VSM

Vice Chief of the Army Staff
- In office 1 October 2005 – 31 December 2006
- Preceded by: Lt Gen Bhupinder Singh Thakur
- Succeeded by: Lt Gen Milan Lalitkumar Naidu

Personal details
- Born: January 1, 1946
- Died: April 26, 2025 (aged 79) Wellington, Tamil Nadu, India
- Awards: Param Vishisht Seva Medal; Ati Vishisht Seva Medal; Sena Medal; Vishisht Seva Medal

Military service
- Allegiance: India
- Branch/service: Indian Army
- Years of service: 1966–2006
- Rank: Lieutenant General
- Unit: Bombay Sappers
- Commands: Western Command; Director General of Information Systems; Defence Attaché to Ankara, Turkey; Colonel Commandant, Bombay Sappers

Lieutenant General S. Pattabhiraman PVSM, AVSM, SM, VSM (1946 – 26 April 2025) was a senior officer in the Indian Army who served as the 27th Vice Chief of the Army Staff from October 2005 to December 2006.

Over a distinguished 40-year career, he served as General Officer Commanding-in-Chief of the Western Command, the first Director General of Information Systems, and Defence Attaché to Turkey. He was also the Colonel Commandant of the Bombay Sappers.

== Early life and education ==
Pattabhiraman was born in 1946. He joined the National Defence Academy and was commissioned into the Corps of Engineers in 1966. He was associated with the Bombay Sappers, one of the premier engineering groups of the Indian Army.

== Military career ==
Throughout his career, Pattabhiraman held several appointments including: Defence Attaché to Ankara, Turkey, Director General of Information Systems, General Officer Commanding-in-Chief, Western Command, Honorary Colonel Commandant, Bombay Sappers. Pattabhiraman served as the Vice Chief of the Army Staff from 1 October 2005 to 31 December 2006. In this capacity, he was responsible for ensuring the Army's readiness and contributed to strategic planning and modernization efforts.

== Post-retirement ==
After retiring in December 2006, Pattabhiraman continued to serve as an administrative member of the Armed Forces Tribunal in Chennai, adjudicating matters related to service personnel.

== Death ==
Pattabhiraman died on 26 April 2025 at the Military Hospital in Wellington, Tamil Nadu at the age of 78. The Indian Army paid tribute, describing him as "a soldier at heart and a leader in spirit".

== Awards and decorations ==
- Param Vishisht Seva Medal (PVSM)
- Ati Vishisht Seva Medal (AVSM)
- Sena Medal (SM)
- Vishisht Seva Medal (VSM)
