= O. S. Ambika =

Indian politician

Member of the Kerala Legislative Assembly for Attingal
- Incumbent
- Assumed office May 2021
- Preceded by: B. Satyan

Personal details
- Born: 30 May 1966 (age 60) Kerala
- Party: Communist Party of India (Marxist)

Omana Sukumaran Ambika (born 30 May 1966), is an Indian politician from Kerala. She is currently serving as the MLA of Attingal constituency since May 2021.
