= Tirath Singh Oberoi =

Tirath Singh Oberoi was Lieutenant general in Indian Army who later on served as the lieutenant governor of Andaman and Nicobar. He was commissioned in the army in 1946 after graduating from the Defence Services Staff College, Tamil Nadu. He served in during the Indo-Pakistani War of 1947–1948 as captain in Punjab Regiment and was presented with Vir Chakra for his services during the Republic Day ceremony of 1950. He was promoted as Lieutenant Colonel in 1964.

Post retirement from army, Oberoi was appointed as lieutenant governor of the Andaman and Nicobar Islands on 4 December 1985 and served till 24 February 1990.
