= Vakkom Purushothaman =

Indian politician (1928–2023)

His Excellency Vakkom Purushothaman
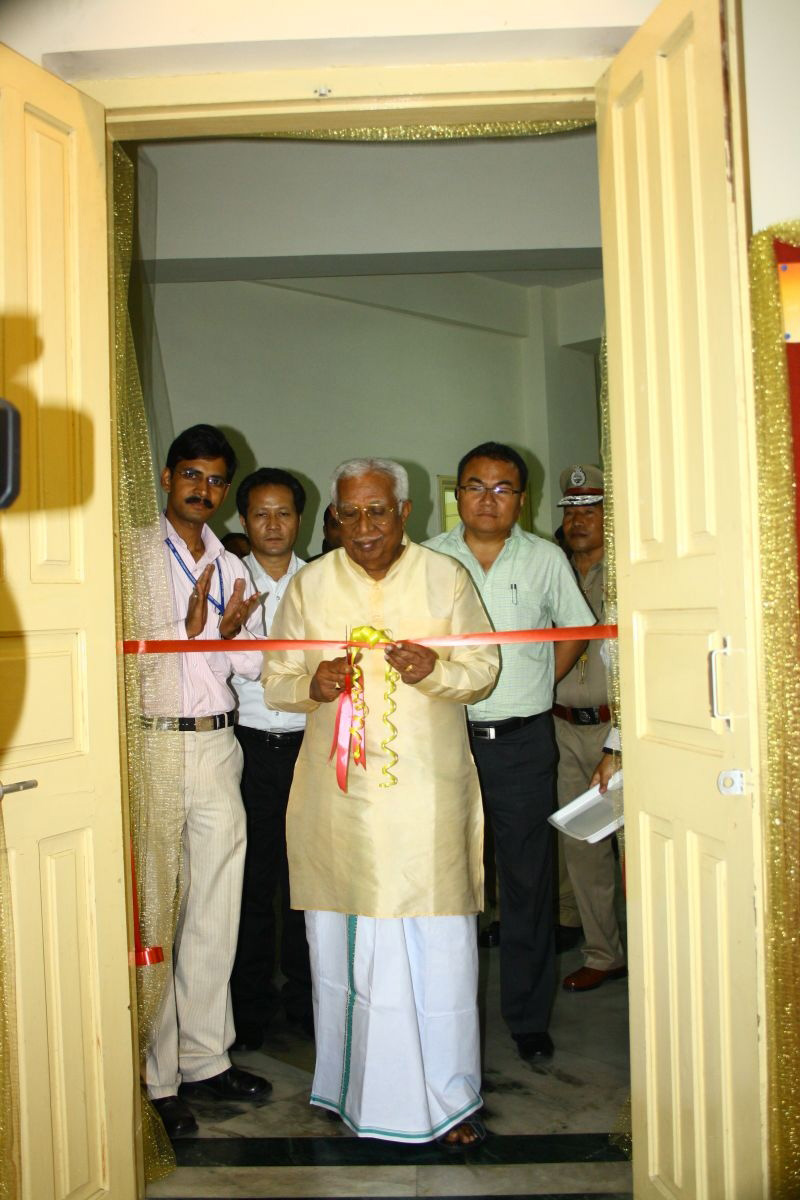
- Purushothaman (center) in 2012

9th Governor of Mizoram
- In office 2 September 2011 – 6 July 2014
- Chief Minister: Lal Thanhawla
- Preceded by: Madan Mohan Lakhera
- Succeeded by: Kamla Beniwal

14th Governor of Tripura
- In office 30 June 2014 – 14 July 2014
- Chief Minister: Manik Sarkar
- Preceded by: Devanand Konwar
- Succeeded by: Padmanabha Acharya

6th Lieutenant Governor of the Andaman and Nicobar Islands
- In office 19 March 1993 – 18 March 1996
- Preceded by: Surjit Singh Barnala
- Succeeded by: Ishwari Prasad Gupta

Speaker of the Kerala Legislative Assembly
- In office 2001–2004
- Chief Minister: A. K. Antony
- Preceded by: M. Vijayakumar
- Succeeded by: Therambil Ramakrishnan
- In office 1982–1984
- Chief Minister: K. Karunakaran
- Preceded by: A. C. Jose
- Succeeded by: V. M. Sudheeran

Minister of Finance and Excise, Government of Kerala
- In office 2004–2006
- Chief Minister: Oommen Chandy
- Preceded by: K. Sankaranarayanan
- Succeeded by: T. M. Thomas Isaac

Minister of Health and Tourism, Government of Kerala
- In office 1980–1981
- Chief Minister: E. K. Nayanar
- Preceded by: K.P. Prabhakaran (Health)
- Succeeded by: R. Sundaresan Nair

Minister of Agriculture and Labour, Government of Kerala
- In office 1971–1977
- Chief Minister: C. Achutha Menon
- Preceded by: Baby John (Labour); N.K. Balakrishnan (Agriculture)
- Succeeded by: Oommen Chandy (Labour); K. Sankaranarayanan (Agriculture)

Member of Parliament, Lok Sabha
- In office 1984–1991
- Preceded by: Susheela Gopalan
- Succeeded by: T. J. Anjalose
- Constituency: Alappuzha

Member of the Kerala Legislative Assembly
- In office 2001–2006
- Preceded by: Anathalavattom Anandan
- Succeeded by: Anathalavattom Anandan
- Constituency: Attingal
- In office 1970–1984
- Preceded by: K. P. K. Das
- Succeeded by: P. Vijayadas
- Constituency: Attingal

Personal details
- Born: 12 April 1928 Vakkom, Kingdom of Travancore, British India (present-day Thiruvananthapuram, Kerala, India)
- Died: 31 July 2023 (aged 95) Thiruvananthapuram, Kerala, India
- Party: Indian National Congress
- Spouse: Dr. Lily Purushothaman
- Children: 3

Vakkom Bhanu Purushothaman (12 April 1928 – 31 July 2023) was an Indian lawyer, administrator and statesman who served as the Governor of Mizoram from 2011 to 2014, Speaker of the Kerala Legislative Assembly, state minister and Lieutenant Governor of the Andaman and Nicobar Islands.

Purushothaman was born at Vakkom near Trivandrum, the capital of the erstwhile Kingdom of Travancore, on 12 April 1928, as the eldest son of Bhanu Panicker and Bhavani Amma. He was also the grandson of Pappu Tharakan, a notable businessman in Travancore.

He started his political life as an active worker of the Students' Congress (now called Kerala Students Union) in 1946, he became a member of Vakkom Panchayat in 1953. Later, he served as President of the District Congress Committee, Thiruvananthapuram and the General Secretary and Vice–President of the Kerala Pradesh Congress Committee. He has been a member of All India Congress Committee for over 35 years.

== Political life ==
Vakkom Purushothaman was elected to the Kerala Legislative Assembly in 1970, 1977, 1980 and 1982 from Attingal constituency. From 1971 to 1977, he held the portfolio of Agriculture and Labour in the Ministry headed by C. Achutha Menon. From 1980 to 1981, he was the Minister for Health and Tourism in the Nayanar Ministry. He served as Speaker of the Kerala Legislative Assembly from 1982 to 1984 and then served for two terms as a Member of Parliament, Lok Sabha, 1984–1991 representing Alappuzha constituency, during which time he was also Chairman of the Committee on Public Undertakings and the Committee on Subordinate Legislation of Parliament. He was the Chairman of the Consultative Committee of Experts to the Inter Parliamentary Union for five years.

From 1993 to 1996, he served as the Lieutenant Governor of the Andaman and Nicobar Islands. In 1996, he lost in the Kerala Legislative Assembly election from Attingal constituency. He was elected from Attingal in 2001 and became the Speaker for a second time, holding office from 2001 to 2004. In 2004, he was made the Minister for Finance and Excise in the Oommen Chandy led UDF government and he briefly officiated as Chief Minister in 2006.

| House | Election | Constituency | Result | Vote margin |
|---|---|---|---|---|
| Kerala Legislative Assembly | 1967 | Attingal | Lost | 5045 |
| Kerala Legislative Assembly | 1970 | Attingal | Won | 11531 |
| Kerala Legislative Assembly | 1977 | Attingal | Won | 8560 |
| Kerala Legislative Assembly | 1980 | Attingal | Won | 13073 |
| Kerala Legislative Assembly | 1982 | Attingal | Won | 7359 |
| Parliament | 1984 | Alappuzha | Won | 37764 |
| Parliament | 1989 | Alappuzha | Won | 25123 |
| Parliament | 1991 | Alappuzha | Lost | 14075 |
| Kerala Legislative Assembly | 1996 | Attingal | Lost | 1016 |
| Kerala Legislative Assembly | 2001 | Attingal | Won | 10816 |

=== Governor of Mizoram ===
On 26 August 2011, President Pratibha Patil appointed Vakkom B. Purushothaman as the new Governor of Mizoram in place of Madan Mohan Lakhera. Vakkom B. Purushothaman was sworn in as the 18th Governor of Mizoram on 2 September 2011. He resigned on 11 July 2014 from his post due to his transfer to Nagaland.

== Personal life and death ==
Purushothaman married his childhood sweetheart Dr. Lily Purushothaman, and they had two sons and one daughter; Biju, Binu and Bindu. His elder son Biju died on 18 January 2012.

Vakkom Purushothaman died on 31 July 2023, at the age of 95.
