= R. Prakasam =

Indian politician (1927–2012)

Member of the Kerala Legislative Assembly
- In office 1957–1960
- Succeeded by: N. Kunjuraman
- Constituency: Attingal

Personal details
- Born: 22 March 1927
- Died: 2012

R. Prakasam (22 March 1927 – 2012) was an Indian politician, who belonged to the Communist Party of India. He represented Attingal in the first Kerala Legislative Assembly.

== Career ==
He was born in 1927 and at a young age, he entered politics. During his college days, Prakasam was active in politics. In 1946, while studying at the Madras Christian College, he joined the Communist Party. Prakasam became the chairman of the Attingal Municipality in 1953. He was the youngest member of the Communist party in the country to be appointed into such position. In 1954, Prakasam became a member of the Thiru-Kochi Assembly. In 1957, he was elected as a member to the first Kerala Legislative Assembly. Prakasam had a key role in establishing party units throughout the capital district's coastal communities, particularly in Attingal and Varkala. Also, he played a key role in planning the 1954 mass transport workers' strike and served as the union's president in Kerala. He has held several positions during his political career. He was a member of the Municipal Law Unification Committee, Kerala University Senate, Industrial Relations Board, Arbitration Board, and the High Power Watchdog Committee of the Government.
