= Bhargavi Thankappan =

Indian politician

Member of the Kerala Legislative Assembly
- In office 1977–1991
- Constituency: Neduvathoor (1977–1980); Kilimanoor (1980–1991)

Member of the Lok Sabha
- In office 1971–1977
- Constituency: Adoor

Personal details
- Born: 24 July 1942 (age 84) Adoor, India
- Party: Communist Party of India
- Education: Sree Narayana College, Kollam (MA)

Bhargavi Thankappan (born 1942) is an Indian politician of the Communist Party of India. She was the deputy speaker of the 8th Kerala Legislative Assembly.

== Early life ==
Bhargavi was born on 24 July 1942 in Adoor to K. Easwaran and his wife K. Kutty. She received her Master of Arts degree in commerce from Sree Narayana College, Kollam.

== Career ==
Bhargavi took up a job at the Rubber Board for a brief period in 1968, before working for the Kerala State Electricity Board until 1971. She entered the Kerala Legislative Assembly for the first time from Neduvathoor constituency as a candidate of the Communist Party of India (CPI). Later, she won the 1971 Indian general election from Adoor seat, reserved for scheduled castes. She represented Kilimanoor in the 6th, 7th, 8th and 10th Kerala Legislative Assembly. She was the deputy speaker for the 8th assembly from 1987 to 1991. She is also a member of the state and national council of CPI.

The CPI expelled Bhargavi in 2002, after the Justice Mohan Kumar Commission found that she had taken bribe from a liquor contractor for smooth running of his business without government intervention. Five years later, a Vigilance Special Court acquitted her for lack of evidence.

== Personal life ==
Bhargavi married A. K. Thankappan on 29 June 1967. Together they have one son and two daughters.
