= Nagendra Nath Jha =

Indian diplomat (1935–2020)

Nagendra Nath Jha (5 January 1935 – 15 June 2020) was an Indian diplomat.

Jha was born on 5 January 1935. After his graduation from Delhi University and the University of Cambridge, he joined the Foreign Service in 1957 and served as Indian ambassador to Ireland (1977–1979), to Turkey (1979–1981), to Kuwait (1984–1989), to Yugoslavia (1989–1990) and to Sri Lanka (1990–1993). Following his retirement he held the office of Lt Governor of Andaman and Nicobar Islands (2001–2004) and Lieutenant Governor of Pondicherry (2004).

Government offices
Preceded by Ishwari Prasad Gupta	Lieutenant Governor of the Andaman and Nicobar Islands; 2001–2004	Succeeded by Ramchandra "Ram" Kapse
