= M. K. Kumaran =

Indian writer, journalist and politician

Member of Parliament, Lok Sabha
- In office 1957–1967
- Preceded by: Constituency established
- Succeeded by: V. P. Nair
- Constituency: Chirayinkeezhu

Personal details
- Born: 29 May 1914 Kottarakara, Kerala, British India
- Died: 1994 Kerala, India
- Party: Communist Party of India
- Other political affiliations: State Congress (formerly)
- Spouse: C. N. Subhadra (m. 1946)
- Children: M. K. Bhadrakumar
- Education: Maharaja's College of Arts, Law College, Trivandrum
- Profession: Politician, Journalist, Lawyer

M. K. Kumaran (1914–1994) was a writer, journalist and politician of Kerala, India. He was twice elected MP for Chirayinkeezhu, first in 1957, and again in 1962.

He was born on May 29, 1914, in Kottarakara, Kerala. He increasingly became involved in political activities during his student days and began working (as a political activist?) with the State Congress, a political party which was formed in 1938 to demand responsible governance in the princely state of Travancore. He was educated at Maharaja's College of Arts and the Law College, Trivandrum, then worked as a lawyer for a short time before going into journalism. Later he joined the Communist Party of India. Having involved in trade union activities in the former Travancore area of Kerala State, he stood in the Lok Sabha elections 1957 and won. He stood again in 1962 and was re-elected.

He died in 1994. He had married in 1946 Shrimati C. N. Subhadra. His son M. K. Bhadrakumar, a former diplomat and author, has fulfilled assignments in the Soviet Union, South Korea, Sri Lanka, Germany, Afghanistan, Pakistan, Uzbekistan, Kuwait and Turkey.

== Electoral history ==
- Member of Parliament, Lok Sabha, Second Lok Sabha (1957—62)
- Member of Parliament, Lok Sabha, Third Lok Sabha (1962—67)

== Works ==
- Rakthasakshi
- Pasternakkum Niroopakanmarum
- Tolstoyiyum Bharyayum
- Yamuna-Yude Theerathu
- Chirakukal
