= Kilimanoor Raja Raja Varma Koithampuran =

Kilimanoor Raja Raja Varma Koithampuran alias Kareendran or Cherunni (1812–1845) was a Sanskrit poet, composer in the Court of Swathi Thirunal Rama varma, King of Travancore. He was born in the Kilimanoor palace. He was an expert in Drutha Kavitha and hence was known as Drutha Kavimani. He is known as Kareendran since he was tall and well built. His ability in writing and presenting poems within seconds earned for him the title Vidwan from His Highness Swathi Thirunal.

== Compositions ==
- Kathakali plays or attakatha

Raavana Vijayam

- Seethankan thullal

Santhana Gopalam
