= B. Satyan =

Indian politician

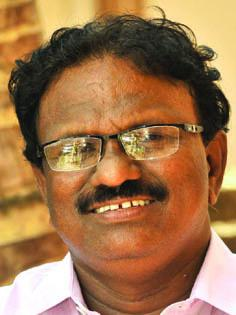
Photo of B. Satyan

B. Satyan (born 30 May 1965) is an Indian politician. He was a member of the 14th Kerala Assembly representing Attingal constituency. He was a member of the Communist Party of India (Marxist).
