= Varkala Radhakrishnan =

Indian politician (1927–2010)

Member of Parliament, Lok Sabha
- In office 1998–2009
- Preceded by: A. Sampath
- Succeeded by: A. Sampath
- Constituency: Chirayinkil

Speaker of Kerala Legislative Assembly
- In office 30 March 1987 – 28 June 1991
- Preceded by: V. M. Sudheeran
- Succeeded by: P.P. Thankachan

Member of Kerala Legislative Assembly
- In office 1977–1996
- Preceded by: T. A. Abdul Majeed
- Succeeded by: A. Ali Hassan
- Constituency: Varkala

Personal details
- Born: 21 August 1927 Varkala, Thiruvananthapuram, Kerala
- Died: 26 April 2010 (aged 82) Thiruvananthapuram, Kerala
- Party: CPI(M)
- Spouse: M. Soudamini
- Children: 1 son and 2 daughters
- As of 23 September, 2006

Varkala V. Radhakrishnan (21 August 1927 – 26 April 2010) was an Indian politician and member of the 14th Lok Sabha. He also served as the speaker of Kerala Legislative Assembly. He represented the Chirayinkil constituency of Kerala and was a member of the Communist Party of India (Marxist) (CPI(M)) political party. He represented the Varkala assembly constituency for five consecutive terms in Niyamasabha.

== Personal life ==
Radhakrishnan was born in Varkala, a town around 40 km from Trivandrum, the capital of Kerala State in India, as the eldest of four sons of Vasudevan and Dakshayani. His maternal grandfather, Manampur Govindan Asan, was a well known Sanskrit Scholar and contemporary of Sri Narayana Guru, the great social reformer who lived in Kerala during the 19th Century. The great Malayalam poet, Kumaran Asan was a student of Govindan Asan.

Radhakrishnan did his schooling at Varkala. After finishing matriculation, he had to discontinue further studies due to some financial difficulties in his family. He took up teaching to support his family. Afterwards, he completed his undergraduate course at Union Christian College, Aluva. Subsequently, he did his graduation in Economics from University College, Trivandrum and majored in Law later on. Radhakrishnan was an alumnus of Government Law College, Ernakulam.

He was married to Saudamini in 1957, a college lecturer in history at the time who later on became the Professor and Head of the Department of History at the Maharaja's College for Women in Trivandrum. Radhakrishnan and Saudamini had two daughters and one son. Saudamini died in 1994 from complications arising out of cardiac surgery.

== Political life ==
He joined the Communist Movement by becoming a member of the Communist Party of India during the 1940s. He became the president of the Varkala Panchayat in 1957, when the first democratically elected Communist Government took office in Kerala State.

After marriage, Radhakrishnan shifted his political base to Trivandrum from Varkala. He set up a brilliant practice for himself at the Trivandrum Bar in Criminal Law and was one of the most sought after lawyers of the time. He also continued his political activities along with his legal career and contested various elections as a candidate of the Communist Party of India (Marxist) with whom he was associated ever since the party was formed in 1964. He contested the State Assembly elections in 1960, 1965, 1970 and 1977 and lost. He also lost the Parliamentary Elections in 1971 from Chirayinkil Constituency in Kerala. During 1967–68, he served as Private Secretary to the then Chief Minister of Kerala, E.M. Sankaran Namboodiripad.

Radhakrishnan tasted electoral success in 1980, when he was elected to Kerala State Assembly from Varkala Constituency. He was subsequently re-elected from the same constituency in 1982, 1987 and 1991. During 1987–91, he served as Speaker of the Kerala Assembly. He was known for his impartiality as a Speaker and had on several occasions chided the Government and its ministers in the Assembly during its sessions for their shortcomings in respect of legislative conduct in the Assembly. He was also an expert in constitutional matters and his comments were always sought by the media with regard to interpretation of provisions of Indian Constitution.

Radhakrishnan shifted his area of activity to the National Stage when he won the Lok Sabha (Lower House of Indian Parliament) from Chirayinkil Constituency in 1998. He was re-elected from the same constituency in 1998 and 2004 as well, thereby serving as an MP for 12 years. During his time as an MP he was very active in parliamentary debates and was involved in various parliamentary standing committees such as Finance, Member's Privileges. He toured the country extensively in pursuance of his parliamentary committee work. He was also a member of Panel of chairmen in the Lok Sabha who are called upon to regulate the proceedings in the absence of the Speaker and Deputy Speaker.

Radhakrishnan did not contest the elections in 2009 to the Lok Sabha, but continued to be actively involved in politics until his death. He was a District Committee Member of the CPI(M) and was also President of All India Lawyers' Union (AILU) and a farmers' organisation affiliated to the party.

== Death ==
Radhakrishnan died on 26 April 2010 aged 82, battling injuries he suffered in a road accident when he was on his regular morning walk four days earlier. He was cremated at his ancestral home at Varkala.
