= Kilimanoor Gram Panchayat =

Kilimanoor Grama Panchayath
- village
- Location in Kerala, India Kilimanoor Grama Panchayath (India)
- Coordinates: 8.803654°N 76.876625°E
- Country: India
- State: Kerala
- District: Thiruvananthapuram
- Talukas: Chirayinkeezhu

Government
  - Body: kilimanoor grama panchayath

Area
  - Total: 19.04 km^{2} (7.35 sq mi)

Population (2001)
  - Total: 20,055
  - Density: 937/km^{2} (2,430/sq mi)

Languages
  - Official: Malayalam, English
- Time zone: UTC+5:30 (IST)
- PIN: 695601
- Vehicle registration: KL-
- Vidhan Sabha constituency: Kilimanoor Assembly Constituency
- Civic agency: kilimanoor grama panchayath

Kilimanoor Grama Panchayat is a panchayath in the Thiruvananthapuram district in the state of Kerala, India.
