= Nagaroor =

- village
- Location in Kerala, India Nagaroor (India)
- Coordinates: 8°44′0″N 76°51′0″E
- Country: India
- State: Kerala
- District: Thiruvananthapuram
- Talukas: Chirayinkeezhu

Government
  - Body: Gram panchayat

Population (2011)
  - Total: 15,072

Languages
  - Official: Malayalam, English
- Time zone: UTC+5:30 (IST)
- PIN: 695102
- Vehicle registration: KL-16

Nagaroor is a village in Thiruvananthapuram district in the state of Kerala, India.

== Demographics ==
As of 2011 India census, Nagaroor had a population of 15072 with 6915 males and 8157 females.

Nagaroor Grama Panchayath is located in Trivandrum District, Chirayinkil Taluk. The people of the village represent several different religions and different political parties; but are friendly and co operative.

Amenities include Nagaroor village office, sub registrar office, and post office. It also has a milk society, a fish market, telephone exchange, a centralised bank as well an engineering college RAJADHANI, a petrol pump and government health center.
