= Pazhayakunnummel =

- village
- Location in Kerala, India Pazhayakunnummel (India)
- Coordinates: 8.773340°N 76.8801200°E
- Country: India
- State: Kerala
- District: Thiruvananthapuram
- Talukas: Chirayinkizh

Government
  - Body: Pazhayakunnummel Grama Panchayath

Population (2011)
  - Total: 24,608

Languages
  - Official: Malayalam, English
- Time zone: UTC+5:30 (IST)
- PIN: 695601
- Vehicle registration: KL-
- Lok Sabha constituency: Attingal Loksabha Constituency
- Vidhan Sabha constituency: Kilimanoor Assembly Constituency
- Civic agency: Pazhayakunnummel Grama Panchayath

Pazhayakunnummel is a village in Thiruvananthapuram district in the state of Kerala, India.

== Demographics ==
As of 2011 India census, Pazhayakunnummel had a population of 24,608 with 11,289 males and 13,319 females.
