= Lakshmi Kant Jha =

Indian diplomat and economic administrator

Lakshmi Kant Jha MBE

Governor of Jammu and Kashmir
- In office 3 July 1973 – 22 February 1981
- President: V. V. Giri; Fakhruddin Ali Ahmed; B. D. Jatti; Neelam Sanjiva Reddy
- Prime Minister: Indira Gandhi; Morarji Desai; Charan Singh; Indira Gandhi
- Chief Ministers: Syed Mir Qasim; Sheikh Abdullah
- Preceded by: Bhagwan Sahay
- Succeeded by: Braj Kumar Nehru

Member of Parliament, Rajya Sabha
- In office 7 July 1986 – 16 January 1988
- Constituency: Bihar

Ambassador of India to the United States
- In office 1970–1973
- Preceded by: Ali Yavar Jung
- Succeeded by: T. N. Kaul

Governor of the Reserve Bank of India
- In office 1 July 1967 – 3 May 1970
- Preceded by: P. C. Bhattacharya
- Succeeded by: B. N. Adarkar

Secretary to the Prime Minister of India
- In office 1964–1966
- Prime Minister: Lal Bahadur Shastri; Indira Gandhi
- Succeeded by: P. N. Haksar

Personal details
- Born: 22 November 1913 Darbhanga district, Bihar, India
- Died: 16 January 1988 (aged 74)
- Party: Indian National Congress
- Education: Benaras Hindu University, Trinity College, Cambridge
- Occupation: Civil servant

Lakshmi Kant Jha, MBE (22 November 1913 – 16 January 1988), born in Darbhanga district, Bihar was the eighth Governor of the Reserve Bank of India from 1 July 1967 to 3 May 1970.

== Education and career ==
Lakshmi Kant Jha was born into a Maithil Brahmin family in Darbhanga, Bihar. He was a member of the 1936 batch of the Indian Civil Service. He was educated at Benares Hindu University (BHU), Trinity College, Cambridge, and the London School of Economics. He studied economics at Cambridge when Keynes was teaching there. Jha was taught by another eminent teacher Harold Laski at the LSE. Jha rose to be a Deputy Secretary in the Department of Supply, during British rule and was appointed an MBE for his service in the 1946 New Year Honours. After Independence, he served as secretary in the Ministries of Industries, Commerce and Finance and Secretary to the Prime Minister of India, Lal Bahadur Shastri (1964–1966) and Indira Gandhi (1966–1967) prior to his appointment as Governor of RBI.

== Major works and achievements ==
During his tenure, the Indian Rupee notes of denominations of ₹ 2, 5, 10, and 100, commemorating the birth centenary of Mahatma Gandhi were released on 2 October 1969. These notes bear his signature, both in English and Hindi. The signature in Hindi, the official language of the Government of India, appeared on the currency notes for the first time during his stewardship of the RBI. A subsequent re-issue on this series notes bears the signature of B. N. Adarkar. His tenure also saw nationalization of 14 major commercial banks, introduction of social controls over commercial banks, establishment of National Credit Council, and the introduction of Lead Bank Scheme to facilitate credit delivery. Amongst other developments, gold controls were brought on a statutory basis; Deposit Insurance was in principle extended to Cooperative banks; and the setting up of the Agricultural Credit Board was undertaken.

He served as India's ambassador to the United States during the crucial period 1970–1973 when India fought a war with Pakistan and liberated Bangladesh. Kissinger acknowledged his persuasive diplomatic skills in the book White House Years. Jha authored a few books including Mr. Red Tape and Economic Strategy for the 80s: Priorities for the Seventh Plan. He was governor of Jammu and Kashmir state from 3 July 1973 to 22 February 1981. His role as an impartial Head of State is still remembered with affection and respect in J&K. He was a member of the Brandt Commission during the 1980s on the North-South economic issues . He was chairman of the Economic Administration Reforms Commission of the Government of India from 1981–1988. He also served as the adviser on economic matters to the P.M. Indira Gandhi and later to the P.M. Rajiv Gandhi. At the time of his death, Jha was a member of the Rajya Sabha. In 1990, the RBI instituted the L.K. Jha Memorial Lectures in commemoration of his memory.

Political offices
Preceded by Ali Yavar Jung	Indian Ambassador to the United States; 1970–1973	Succeeded by T. N. Kaul
Preceded by Bhagwan Sahay	Governor of Jammu and Kashmir; 1973–1981	Succeeded by Braj Kumar Nehru
