= Rajendra Kumari Bajpai =

Indian politician

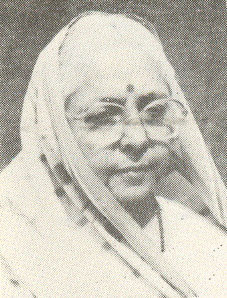

Lieutenant Governor of Pondicherry
- In office 2 May 1995 – 22 April 1998
- President: Shankar Dayal Sharma; K. R. Narayanan
- Chief Minister: R. V. Janakiraman
- Preceded by: Marri Chenna Reddy
- Succeeded by: Rajani Rai

Union Minister of State (Independent Charge) for Welfare
- In office 25 September 1985 – 2 December 1989
- Prime Minister: Rajiv Gandhi
- Succeeded by: Ram Vilas Paswan

Member of Parliament, Lok Sabha
- In office 1980–1991
- Preceded by: Har Govind Verma
- Succeeded by: Janardan Prasad Mishra
- Constituency: Sitapur

Personal details
- Born: 8 February 1925 Laluchak, Bihar, British India
- Died: 17 June 1999 (aged 74) Allahabad, Uttar Pradesh, India
- Party: Indian National Congress

Rajendra Kumari Bajpai (8 February 1925 – 17 July 1999) was an Indian National Congress politician, a former Union Minister of India and former Lieutenant Governor of Pondicherry. She was elected three times to the Lok Sabha from Sitapur constituency in 1980, 1984 and 1989 and was a close confidant of former Prime Minister Indira Gandhi.

== Early life and family ==
She was born on 8 February 1925 in Laluchak, Bhagalpur district, Bihar to Pt. S.K. Mishra, she was the granddaughter of Ravi Shankar Shukla and niece of Shyama Charan Shukla. After her schooling she received M.A. and Ph.D. degrees from Allahabad University.

She married D.N. Bajpai, a teacher by profession in 1947, who also took part in the Quit India Movement of 1942. The couple had a son Ashok Bajpai and a daughter Mrs. Manisha Dwivedi.

== Career ==
She was member of the Legislative Assembly of Uttar Pradesh from 1962 to 77; remained the head of Uttar Pradesh Congress Committee (UPCC) and a close confidant of former Prime Minister Indira Gandhi. Eventually she held various ministries in the Cabinet of Uttar Pradesh (1970–77). Thereafter, she was elected to the Lok Sabha three consecutive times from Sitapur in 1980, 1984 and 1989. She became Union Minister of State with independent charge of Ministry of Social Welfare (1984–86), Minister of State with independent charge of Labour (1986–87) and Minister of State with independent charge of Welfare (1987–89) with Rajiv Gandhi as Prime Minister. She was appointed lieutenant governor of Pondicherry from 2 May 1995 to 22 April 1998.

She died on 17 July 1999 at Allahabad after a prolonged kidney-related illness. She was survived by her husband and children. At the time of her death, her son Ashok Bajpai was president of the District Congress committee, while Dr Ranjana Bajpai, her daughter-in-law was president of Uttar Pradesh Mahila Congress.
