= Kamla Bhasin =

Indian social scientist (1946–2021)

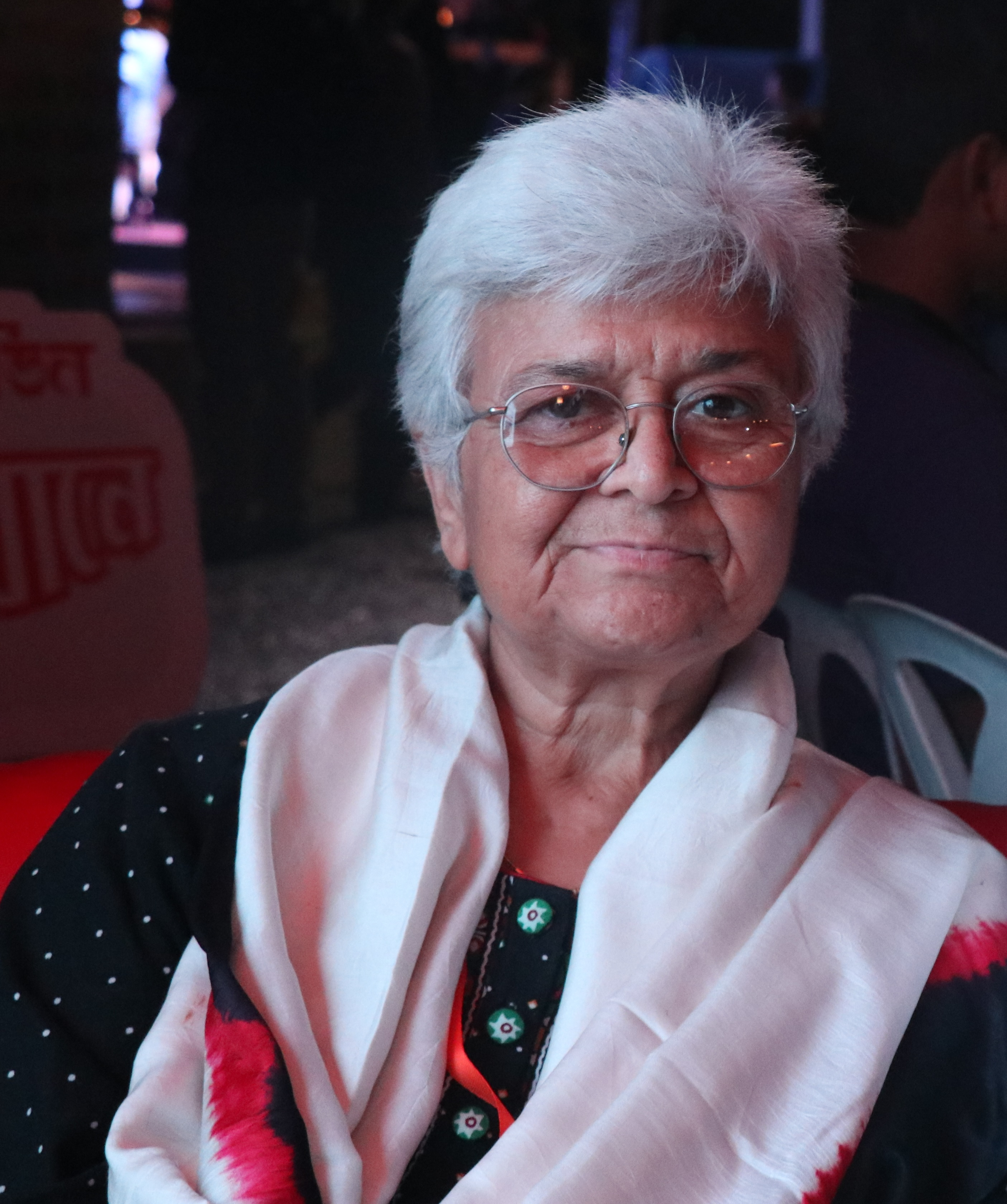
- Bhasin in Dhaka Lit Fest 2017
- Born: 24 April 1946; Shaheedanwali, Mandi Bahauddin, Punjab, British India (now in Punjab, Pakistan)
- Died: 25 September 2021 (aged 75); Delhi, India
- Education: Rajasthan University, University of Münster
- Occupations: feminist activist, poet, author
- Writing career
- Language: Hindi, English
- Notable works: Borders & Boundaries: Women in India's Partition (book)

Kamla Bhasin (24 April 1946 – 25 September 2021) was an Indian developmental feminist activist, poet, author and social scientist. Bhasin's work, that began in 1970, focused on gender education, human development and the media. She lived in New Delhi, India. She was best known for her work with Sangat - A Feminist Network and for her poem Kyunki main ladki hoon, mujhe padhna hai. In 1995, she recited a refurbished, feminist version of the popular poem Azadi (Freedom) in a conference. She was also the South Asia coordinator of One Billion Rising.

She resigned from her job at the U.N. in 2002, to work with Sangat, of which she was a founder member and adviser. She believed in a form of advocacy that combines feminist theory and community action. She worked with underprivileged women from tribal and working communities, often using posters, plays and other non literary methods to get through to communities with low literacy rates. She had always maintained that in order to usher effective change, sloganeering must be accompanied by community mobilization.

== Early and personal life ==
Kamla Bhasin called herself 'The Midnight Generation', a reference to the generation of Indians born around the time of independence, 'at the stroke of the midnight hour..'. She was the fourth of six siblings. Her father was a doctor in Rajasthan. She grew up around villages in India and it helped her form an understanding about women's issues in villages in India. This experience would be instrumental in her life and future career. She went to a government university for her bachelor's and master's. She later said that she found the experience uninspiring and graduated with second division.

Bhasin met her (ex) husband in Rajasthan while working for Seva Mandir. She had later recounted that her husband was an incredibly feminist man and espoused progressive ideas. Her husband suggested that their children take both their surnames and was supportive when Bhasin's 70-year-old mother moved in with them. However, things turned sour after incidents of domestic abuse and infidelity by him.

She considered her greatest loss to be the suicide of her adult daughter, who was really important to her. She also had a son who became disabled after a severe reaction to a vaccine.

== Education and career ==
=== Beginning of politicization ===
Bhasin earned a M.A. from Rajasthan University and then went on to study Sociology of Development at University of Münster in West Germany with a fellowship. Afterward, she taught at the Orientation Centre of the German Foundation for Developing Countries in Bad Honnef for around a year. She then wanted to return to India, and implement what she learned there. Hence, she started working for Seva Mandir, which works primarily in natural resource sustainability. There she learnt about how caste is endemic in Indian society, and how discrimination manifests itself even in governance. That was manifest in the fact that Brahmin's wells would never go dry as they received state funds to drill every year. This was when she realized that caste and feminism were intersectional.

=== Work at UN and subsequent founding of Sangat ===
After that, she started working with the Food and Agriculture Organization, and was assigned to identify innovative development work in Asian countries and create networks between people –across countries. She lamented later that at that time, in the 70s when the subcontinent was gripped in mutual animosity and war, it was difficult to create networks and come together as South Asians. She thus, moved to Bangladesh in 1976 and worked with Gonoshasthaya Kendra, a rural public health organization. It was where she met Zafrullah Chowdhury, a Bangladeshi public health worker and activist, who changed her perspective about a lot of things. She later described him as one of the few men who thought 'out of the box' in South Asia.

She quit her job at the UN in 2002, to work full-time on her feminist network, Sangat which she had been working on for a while. She then, in association with Sangat, organized workshops on understanding feminist theory and develop a feminist awakening. The organization has organized the "Sangat Month Long Course" since 1984, helping more than 650 women in South Asia develop a better understanding of gender, poverty, social justice, sustainable development, peace, democracy and human rights. "The method of our capacity building course is multi-dimensional and participatory. For one month, the participants try and understand what patriarchy is." she said.

=== Writings and other works ===
She wrote books and booklets about understanding patriarchy and gender, that have been translated into near about 30 languages. These are now used by many NGOs to help people understand gender issues. Her book, Laughing Matters, that she co-authored with Bindia Thapar, first published in 2005 was republished in 2013 and now has a Hindi version (Hasna Toh Sangharsho Mein Bhi Zaroori Hai), Feminism & Its Relevance in South Asia. Other important writings by her include: Borders & Boundaries: Women in India's Partition, Understanding Gender, What Is Patriarchy? In her writings and politics, she envisioned a feminist movement that transcends class, borders and other binary social divisions. She was an integral part of the One Billion Rising movement in South Asia. She went to Nepal to flag off the 2017 edition of the movement in Kathmandu, Nepal. At a 2013 One Billion Rising event in New Delhi, she recited her famous Azadi poem to much acclaim and public participation.

==== Children's books and rhymes ====
Kamla Bhasin is also known for writing humorous and insightful Children's Books and Rhymes which made the concept of patriarchy, gender roles and masculinity easily understandable to young kids. Her famous feminist books for children include Laal Pari, Ulti Sulti Meeto and Dhammak Dham. These books were translated in difference languages and illustrated for kids to understand the concept of gender equality by challenging gender stereotypes and traditional gender roles in the society.

== Points of view and advocacy ==
Capitalist patriarchy

She spoke out against capitalism as an agent of the patriarchy, for objectifying women's bodies. However her revulsion of capitalism emerged from a much deeper political stand. She argued that the nature of the modern family is based in the concept of ownership. "This all started when private property came into existence. People wanted to pass on their legacy, but men did not know who their children were, only women were known as mothers because there were no families. That is when patriarchy came.", she said.

Moreover, she argued that modern neoliberal capitalism, and its obscene digits like the pornography industry and the cosmetics industry, both billion dollar industries, reduces women to their bodies. Moreover, these industries promote a form of dehumanization of women, that contributes to a culture of violence and abuse. "So once you are a body – what's the harm in raping you or groping you?" Kamla asks. She derides capitalism as a system when everything is saleable and profits matter more than people.

Cultural change

"India needs a cultural revolution", said Bhasin. She resented that South Asia's women are shackled by a myriad of social customs and beliefs that embrace and straddle the patriarchy. "Often religion is used as a shield to justify patriarchy. When you question something, you are told, yeh toh hamara sanskar hai, riwaaj hai (This is our culture, our traditions). And when this is done, it means logic has ended, belief has come in.", she told The Hindu in a 2013 interview.

She challenged patriarchal ideas in language, and questioned the validity and history of everyday words. The Hindi word swami, that is often used for a partner, for instance, implies 'lord' or 'owner', as does the word 'husband', which originates from animal husbandry. She adjudged all these customs against the constitution of India that offers every woman the right to equality and the promise of a dignified life.

=== Views on feminist theory ===
Bhasin rejected the notion that feminism is a western concept. She stressed that Indian feminism has its roots in its own struggles and tribulations. She said that she didn't become a feminist by reading other feminists, she became one as a part of a larger natural evolution from merely a development worker, to a feminist development worker. She said that it is the story of many others.

When asked what she had to say on the premise that the term feminism antagonizes a lot of people, she said, "People are not happy with feminism, and even if I call it XYZ, they will still be against. It is because they mind the fact that we want freedom, we want equality, and there are lots of people, customs, and traditions who don't want to give women freedom."

While she agreed that theory and action have to go hand in hand for change to come, she believed that feminist theory is important. Her workshops routinely consulted with and worked with social scientists, feminists and academics. They can be described as a marriage between action and theory.

She maintained that feminism is not a war between men and women. She said it is a fight between two ideologies. One that elevates men and gives them power, and the other, that advocates for equality.

Bhasin has been criticized for her Trans-exclusionary remarks and views, for which she eventually apologised.

== Death ==
Bhasin died on 25 September 2021 at the age of 75 due to cancer.
