= Jagat Singh Mehta =

Indian politician and diplomat

Foreign Secretary of India
- In office 1976–1979
- Preceded by: Kewal Singh
- Succeeded by: Ram Sathe

Personal details
- Born: 17 July 1922
- Died: 6 March 2014 (aged 91)
- Relations: Ali Khan Mahmudabad (Grandson)
- Parent: Mohan Sinha Mehta
- Education: Leighton Park School, Allahabad University, Cambridge University
- Occupation: Diplomat, Social Worker
- Military career
- Allegiance: British India
- Branch: Royal Indian Navy
- Service years: 1945–1947
- Rank: Sub-Lieutenant
- Conflicts: Second World War

Jagat Singh Mehta (17 July 1922 – 6 March 2014) was a civil servant, diplomat, academician, and author who served as India's Foreign Secretary from 1976 to 1979. His career in the Indian Foreign Services (IFS) spanned from 1947 to 1980 during which he played a pivotal role in shaping India's foreign policy.

Prior to his appointment as the Foreign Secretary, he served in various capacities, both in India and abroad, and worked closely with Prime Minister Jawahar Lal Nehru, Prime Minister Indira Gandhi, and Morarji Desai. His diplomatic assignments included postings in Berne, London, Bonn, Peking, and Dar-es-Salaam. He occupied positions such as Charge d'affaires in China between 1963 and 1966, High Commissioner to Tanzania between 1970 and 1974, and Additional Secretary of the IFS between 1972 and 1976,

Mehta's diplomatic contributions earned him widespread recognition, including prestigious honors such as the Padma Bhushan in 2002.

Beyond his diplomatic career, he played a pivotal role in resurrecting and leading Vidya Bhawan, driven by his commitment and his father's vision of bridging the gap between the rich and the poor by providing civic-minded education to all. He sought to extend the lessons of diplomacy into education, fostering democratic values and egalitarian principles among young students while ensuring access to high-quality education for all.

Mehta died at the age of 91 in Udaipur due to age-related health issues.

== Early life and education ==
Jagat Singh Mehta was born in Udaipur to a family of public servants who had served in the princely State of Mewar since Rana Hamir's time. His mother died due to tuberculosis when he was 2 years old, leaving him as the only child to the care of his father, Dr. Mohan Singh Mehta, and his extended family. After pursuing some of his early years of schooling in Indore, Mehta was admitted to the Modern School in Delhi which was then the best-known non-missionary educational institution in northern India. In 1932, he was admitted to Vidya Bhawan, a school started by his father Dr. Mohan Singh Mehta with his associates with the goal of inculcating Gandhian ideals in youngsters and providing "uncommon education to common children".

In 1937, Jagat's father got him admitted to Leighton Park, a Quaker school in Reading, England. He completed his A-levels there and returned back to India at the onset of World War II where he enrolled at Allahabad University. He led a rich life, involving himself in sports such as squash and the University Training Corps (UTC), where he became platoon of his service after 2 years. He got a first-class MA (final) at Allahabad University. He then taught as a lecturer at Allahabad University for six months in the English Department.

In 1945, he got a wartime commission in the Royal Indian Navy and was even offered a permanent commission, but he turned it down because he had a deep desire to join the Indian Civil Services. After sitting for the exam, he proceeded to study Economics at St John's College, Cambridge, where he learned that he had been selected in the Indian Civil Services. His selection came at a time when there was a transition being made from the ICS and IPS to the Indian Administrative Services and the Indian Foreign Services respectively. Based on his examination and an interview with Prime Minister Jawahar Lal, he was appointed to the Indian Foreign Services in 1947.

== Career ==
=== Early diplomatic assignments ===
Jagat Mehta began his diplomatic career in 1947 as Private Secretary to the Secretary General of the Indian Foreign Service, working closely with Prime Minister Nehru on key foreign policy issues and assignments, including India-Pakistan relations post-partition, Kashmir Resolution at the UN, and the 1948 Commonwealth Prime Ministers' Conference. He was subsequently appointed Under Secretary for Southeast Asia.

In the next few years to follow, Mehta served abroad, first in Bern as First Secretary, and later in London as the Principal Private Secretary to the High Commissioner.

Upon returning to India, he was appointed Deputy Secretary (Personnel), where he led the first structured review of the Indian Foreign Service. During this period, he played a pivotal role in shaping India's diplomatic stance during the 1956 Suez Crisis, serving as Secretary of the Indian Delegation at the Users' Conference in London and advocating for Egypt's right to nationalize the Suez Canal.

=== India–China relations ===
In 1956, Mehta was appointed Deputy Secretary (East) with responsibilities of overseeing India's policy towards tensions arising in Northeast India along with other Asian nations including Japan, Mongolia, China, Tibet, Sikkim, and Bhutan. He assumed key responsibility in negotiating boundary disputes with China in Aksai Chin and the North-East Frontier Agency (now Arunachal Pradesh). Prime Minister Jawahar Lal Nehru constructed a positive attitude towards the tribal belt to be implemented by the newly constituted. Indian Frontier Administrative Services (IFAS). Nehru wanted to introduce a controlled development of NEFA and protect tribals from commercialisation and exploitation which could likely be done by duplication of civil administration in the plains districts. Mehta's task as Deputy Secretary was confined to marshaling facts and ensuring the implementation rather than focusing on policy planning

After a 2-year long posting in Bonn, Germany superintending a large and active Indian embassy with the main goal being to harness Federal Germany's economic assistance in India's Second and Third Five Year Plans, Mehta was transferred to Peking as the Head of the Embassy in 1963 until 1966 where he also became Charge d'Affaires. His experience in holding long negotiations related to the Sino-India boundary dispute made him command particular interest from many heads of the mission. He was involved in back-channel diplomacy and building confidence-building measures with China.

Mehta's work and speeches have often reflected the belief that India and China can work together in unity and with peace due to their shared interests in regional stability and development.

=== Policy Planning Division ===
In 1966, Mehta was recalled to India from Peking to establish the Policy Planning Division at the Ministry of External Affairs. He was made responsible for devising the key structure and organization of the policy planning division along with hashing out its roles and responsibilities which he formalised as evaluating how global developments might affect India in the future. In the original structure, Mehta had recommended that the Foreign Secretary preside over the PPD so that those with operational responsibilities could interact with planners with recommendations. However, PPD occupied a more ad-hoc utilization over the years, being treated as either supplementary or as a replacement, but never the same as an in-house think tank.

Between 1966 and 1969, Mehta authored 20 major policy papers during his time at the PPD.

=== Ambassador to Tanzania and African diplomacy (1970–1974) ===
After completing his sabbatical at Harvard University as the first Indian Foreign Service (IFS) officer in the International Fellowship program, Mehta received a posting to Tanzania. Initially, Mehta was wary of the posting, suspecting it was a punitive repercussion for his assertive and independent conduct, especially during his time in China. However, his doubts soon gave way to what became one of the most rewarding experiences of his career.

In Tanzania, Mehta worked to enhance economic cooperation and create employment opportunities for the Indian expatriate community. Despite underlying tensions between India and African nations at the time, he focused on fostering a stable and mutually beneficial relationship. He deeply admired President Julius Nyerere's integrity and social values and, in return, earned the President's respect—who praised him as one of the finest envoys he had encountered.

Mehta's time in Tanzania deeply influenced his approach to foreign service appointments. Committed to raising the importance of postings in Africa and other developing regions, he prioritized assigning capable and promising IFS officers to these roles. He introduced a policy requiring officers to gain relevant experience in developing countries before occupying senior positions at headquarters. Through initiatives like this, Mehta solidified his reputation for fostering strong international relations and securing India's position as a nation committed to global development.

=== Additional Secretary ===
In 1974, he was recalled to India by Foreign Secretary Kewal Singh, who intended to appoint him as Additional Secretary at the Ministry of External Affairs. In this role, Mehta oversaw the administration division and directed the Policy Planning Division. He was involved in administrative duties related to key events at the time, such as India's Peaceful Nuclear Explosion in Pokhran and the annexation of Sikkim with the Indian Union. His main effort was to bring greater transparency in the day-to-day functioning of the Ministry's administration. He upheld the rotational system for appointments and transfers, earning a reputation for fairness and integrity. He became a central figure within the ministry, assisting Foreign Secretary Kewal Singh in handling many parliamentary inquiries. By the end of his term, he was effectively regarded as an Assistant Foreign Secretary.

=== Foreign Secretary of India (1976–1979) ===
In February 1976, it was announced that Jagat Singh Mehta would be the next Foreign Secretary of India. His tenure was marked by advancing regional diplomacy and resolving long-standing disputes.

A major focus of Mehta's efforts was on improving relations with Pakistan which had stagnated since the Simla Agreement of 1972. He made efforts to lead initiatives for the comprehensive normalization of relations, including restoring diplomatic ties, resuming civil aviation, facilitating state trading in key goods, and reopening rail links and roadways. He played a significant role in resolving the Salal hydropower project dispute which stemmed from concerns over the project's design and its potential impact on water flow from the Chenab River, which was allocated to Pakistan under the Indus Waters Treaty of 1960. Leading bilateral talks in 1976, Mehta facilitated negotiations that resulted in India agreeing to modify the project's design which would reduce the height of the dam by a few meters, ensuring uninterrupted water flow to Pakistan—a significant achievement in peaceful conflict resolution. Mehta feels that this minor concession saved the bilateral relations between India Pakistan. The 1976 normalisation eventually led to a visit by the then-foreign minister Atal Behari Vajpayee to Pakistan in 1978 where he reaffirmed faith in friendship with Pakistan.

Moreover, after the Saur Revolution in Afghanistan in 1978, Jagat Mehta played a key role in preventing the militarization of Pakistan. He consistently worked on strengthening India-Pakistan ties, emphasizing dialogue over military escalation to prevent a destructive weapons race by reassuring Pakistan that India's interest was in a peaceful and stable region, rather than exploiting the political upheaval in Afghanistan. Mehta's consistent emphasis on non-alignment sought to distance India from being drawn into the ideological conflict between the U.S. and the Soviet Union. His approach helped maintain relations with both superpowers while fostering regional peace and cooperation.

Mehta played a crucial role in negotiations with Bangladesh over the water-sharing issues at the Farakka Barrage. Amid concerns over reduced water flow from the Ganges, he served as deputy leader of the Indian delegation. As deputy leader of the Indian delegation, he guided the talks, leading to a 1977 agreement that allocated 34,500 cusecs of the 55,000 cusecs upstream flow of the Ganges to Bangladesh. The two countries discussed the issue bilaterally and managed to sign an agreement for a limited duration, which paved the way for a formal water-sharing treaty in 1996.

Mehta played a key role in negotiating and managing trade and transit agreements that ensured the smooth flow of goods, services, and people between India and Nepal. Given Nepal's landlocked status, the country had long sought separate trade and transit arrangements with India, although India had initially hesitated. In 1978, through skillful negotiations, Mehta helped facilitate an agreement that addressed Nepal's concerns by separating the two agreements. Mehta viewed these concessions as essential in preventing growing anti-Indian sentiment in Nepal and believed they would contribute to a more stable and cooperative bilateral relationship.

Mehta served as Foreign Secretary during a period of political transition, staying in office when Morarji Desai of the Janata Party succeeded Indira Gandhi as prime minister in 1977, with Atal Bihari Vajpayee as foreign minister. Despite the change in leadership, Mehta ensured continuity in India's foreign policy, focusing on the core principles of nonalignment. He maintained stable relations with both Cold War superpowers, the United States and the Soviet Union, as well as with other major global powers. Under his leadership, India also worked to strengthen its relationships with neighboring countries, including Pakistan, Bangladesh, Nepal, Bhutan, and Sri Lanka. Mehta emphasized the importance of diplomatic consistency and fostering cooperative ties with India's neighbors. His approach ensured that India's foreign policy remained steady during a time of political change at home, focusing on long-term stability and peace. Throughout his term, he brought out diplomatic breakthroughs, and global and regional cooperation and also maintained a steadfast commitment to non-alignment.

After serving 38 months in office, in 1979 Mehta was asked to step down following Charan Singh's appointment as prime minister.

=== Life after Foreign Services ===
Following his retirement from foreign service, Mehta immersed himself in academia. Even before officially relinquishing his duties in July 1980, he was invited by Ben Brown, the director of the Fellows Programme at Harvard's Center for International Affairs (CFIA). Mehta spent an academic year at Harvard, marking the beginning of his post-diplomatic career in the field of education. After completing his tenure at Harvard, he became a Fellow at the Woodrow Wilson International Center for Scholars in Washington, D.C., where he served for nine months, becoming the first Indian official to hold this prestigious position.

In 1983-1984, Mehta was appointed the Distinguished Tom Slick Professor of World Peace at the LBJ School of Public Affairs, where he taught a postgraduate course titled Misperceptions in Post-War Diplomacy and organized a World Peace conference focusing on the theme Third World Militarization: A Challenge to Third World Diplomacy. This experience marked the beginning of a long-term academic engagement, as he continued to teach at the university every autumn term from 1984 to 1996.

== Personal life ==
=== Marriage and family ===
Jagat Singh Mehta first met his wife, Rama Mehta in the Delhi Gymkhana Club in 1948. Soon after that, she was assigned to his office in the Ministry of External Affairs for official training as one of the two women Foreign Services officers. At this time he was the Private Secretary to the Secretary-General but also volunteered to work as US (undersecretary) of the Arab World and Turkey. Two months after their meeting, Jagat sought the approval of his family to take a bride of his choosing and proposed to Rama, who came from a wealthy Gujarati family and was the daughter of N.C Mehta, an Indian Civil Servant in the Uttar Pradesh cadre. Rama and Jagat got married in Udaipur. Rama Mehta completed her undergraduate degree at Isabella Thoburn College, Lucknow. She led a short career in the IFS but she was given independent charge as Under Secretary, Iran and Afghanistan as well as Americas's Under Secretary. She completed her MA in Philosophy at Delhi University. In 1946, she pursued a degree in Psychology from Columbia University, New York. Rama left the foreign service in 1951, after her daughter was born and when Jagat Mehta got posted abroad. She went on to publish a few books, one of which received the Sahitya Akademi Award.

They had four children together – Vijay, Vikram, Ajay and Uday. Rama Mehta died on 4 June 1978 after an unforeseen heart attack.

=== Philanthropy ===
After retiring in 1980 and transitioning to academia and teaching at the University of Texas for nearly five years, Jagat Mehta returned to India at the request of the trustees of Seva Mandir, who sought his leadership as Chief Executive to address the institution's ongoing crisis and uphold the legacy of his father. Jagat Mehta took charge of Seva Mandir during a period of fear, uncertainty, and growing cronyism. Endemic poverty and persistent drought had made it increasingly difficult to sustain the institution, a challenge compounded by insufficient government support and imbalanced internal power dynamics. Mehta subsequently implemented a series of administrative and operational reforms to revitalize the organization.

Following his father's death in 1985, Mehta took over as the President of Seva Mandir and subsequently as the president of Vidya Bhawan in 1993. His tenure at Vidya Bhawan was marked by the implementation of significant structural reforms, including the ratification of a new constitution and efforts to unify its various institutional branches. Serving as president for six years, he prioritized bridging socioeconomic disparities by ensuring high-quality education was accessible to underprivileged communities. His efforts were guided by focusing on empowerment through education.

Mehta's leadership at Vidya Bhawan was driven by his commitment to eliminating caste and religious inequalities through inclusive education. He sought to instill values of social justice, democracy, and egalitarianism in the youth, ensuring that education became a tool for societal transformation.

== Sources ==
- Mehta, Jagat S. (2015). The Tryst Betrayed: Reflections on Diplomacy and Development. Penguin. ISBN 9788184757842.

Diplomatic posts
Preceded by Kewal Singh	Foreign Secretary of India; 1976 - 1979	Succeeded by Ram Sathe
