= Bidesh Tukaram Kulkarni =

Indian politician

4th Lieutenant Governor of Puducherry
- In office 30 Aug 1976 – 31 Oct 1980
- Preceded by: Chhedi Lal
- Succeeded by: Ram Kishore Vyas

Member of Parliament, Rajya Sabha
- In office 1962–1974
- Constituency: Maharashtra

Personal details
- Born: 15 September 1909
- Died: 28 November 1988 (aged 79)
- Party: Indian National Congress
- Spouse: Shantabai

Bidesh Tukaram Kulkarni (1909–1988) was an Indian politician. He was the fourth Lieutenant Governor of Puducherry. He was elected to the Rajya Sabha, upper house of the Parliament of India from Maharashtra as a member of the Indian National Congress.
