= Adarkar =

Adarkar is a surname. Notable people with the surname include:

- B. N. Adarkar, ninth Governor of the Reserve Bank of India
- Suruchi Adarkar, Indian actress
