= Lok Niwas, Pondicherry =

Residence of the Lieutenant Governor of Puducherry

Lok Nivas, Puducherry
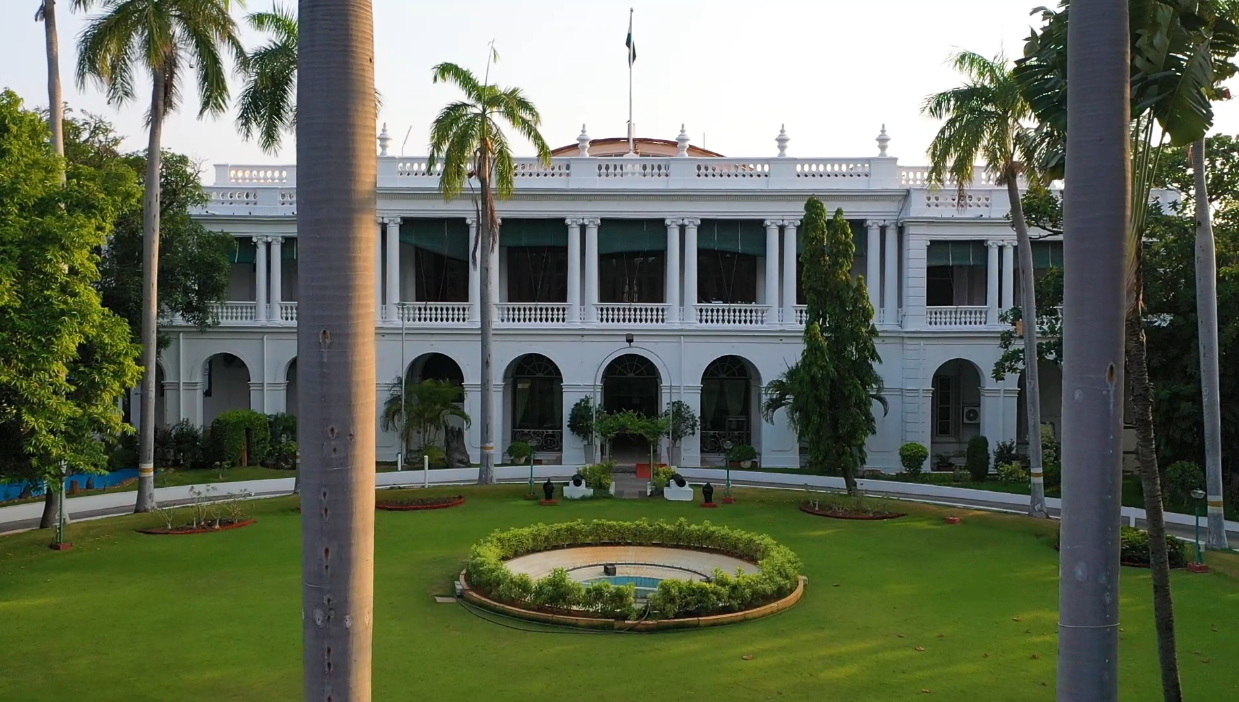
- Lok Niwas in Puducherry

General information
- Coordinates: 11.9348°N 79.8346°E
- Current tenants: lieutenant governor of Puducherry is K. Kailashnathan.
- Owner: Government of Puducherry

Website
- https://rajnivas.py.gov.in/index.php

Lok Niwas, formerly Raj Niwas (translation: Government House) is the official residence of the Lieutenant Governor of Puducherry. It is located in Puducherry's capital city of Pondicherry. Once, it was the official residence of the French Governors.

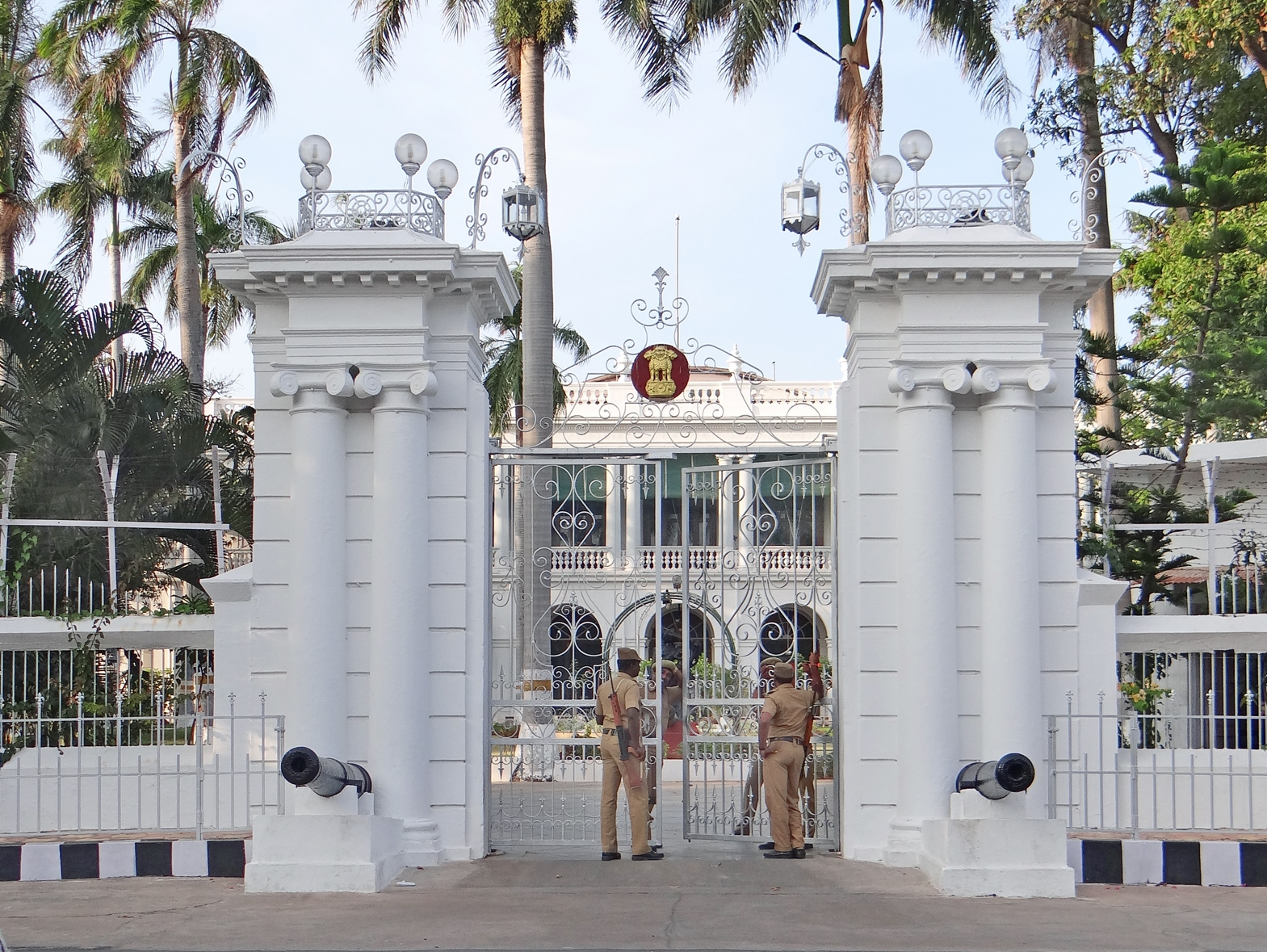
Le palais du Gouvernement (Pondichéry, Inde) (13995096515)

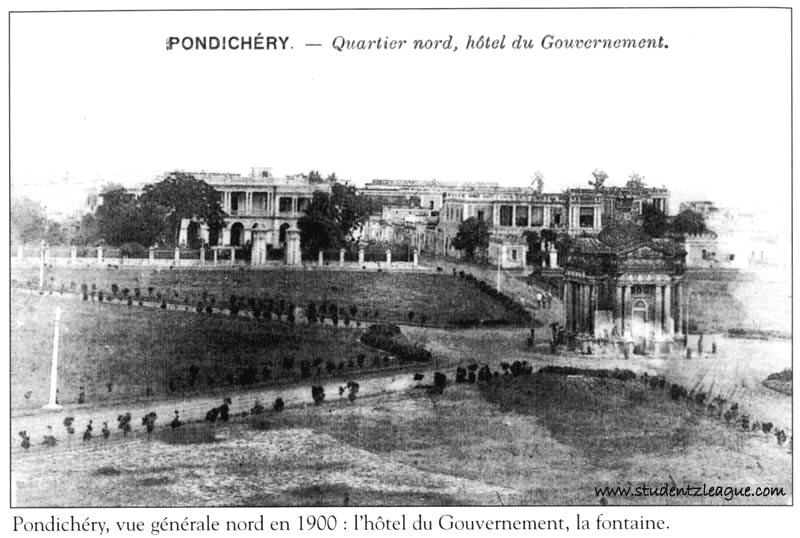
The Governor's Palace in 1900

== History ==
Lok Niwas, formerly Le Palais Du Governor, then Raj Niwas, is surrounded by the Rue Jawaharlal Nehru on the north, Rue De Rangapoule on the south, Rue Saint Louis on the east and Rue Francois Martin on the west with access from the north and south.

Pierre Benoît Dumas, the French Governor for Pondicherry, laid the foundation for a Governor’s palace in 1738 but the palace had to wait for the arrival of Joseph François Dupleix to see its completion.

When Jean Law de Lauriston took over Pondicherry in 1765 the town was completely in ruins. Within a short span of three years a whole new town sprang up on the ruins of the old - the Governor’s Palace and the administration offices on the north, the warehouses on the south, the military barracks on the east and west.

== Architecture ==
The House of the Governor, now the Lok Niwas, was built on the former site of the Hotel de la Compaigne.

Initially built in the French Baroque style, it was destroyed in the year 1761 by the British and was subsequently rebuilt in the Rococo style from 1766 onwards.

It was a rectangular, single storied structure running east to west with porticoes on either side of the flanked by two other rectangular wings on the east and west, but was later converted into a double storied House.

Much later the Southern Verandas were subsequently widened and its frontage was beautified and given a face-lift. Since then the southern gate has been the official entrance of the Raj Niwas.

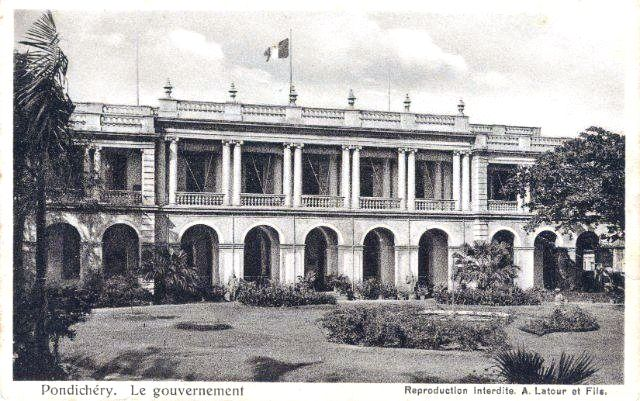
Raj Niwas before independence.

== Features ==
The Governor’s Palace provides accommodation for state and personal guests of the Governor.

The suites are named after the various regions of the Union Territory, namely Pondicherry, Karaikal, Mahe and Yanam.

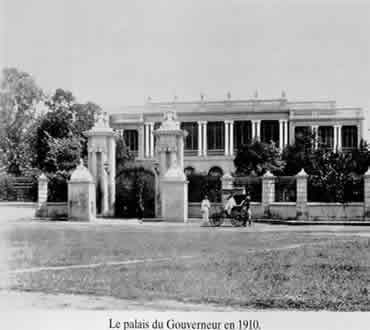
Alfred Albert Martineau 's period

== Description ==
The Lok Niwas has a vast collection of ancient artifacts as well as collections of crockery, brass and silver wares, crockery, delicate porcelain, coins, statues, crockery, vases, antique furniture, crockery and a grand piano.

== Eco-initiatives at the Raj Niwas ==
Eco-initiatives at the Lok Niwas include eco-initiatives to reuse, reduce and recycle and conserve energy.

The Lok Niwas kitchen follows the mantra of serving local, organic food.

Eco-friendly products are sourced from local producers and are used at the Lok Niwas and provided for the guests.

Under its green initiative, local artisans and craftsman are supported by ensuring that all gifts, mementos and decorative are sourced specifically from Puducherry.

== See also ==
- List of official residences of India
