= List of municipal commissioners of Ahmedabad =

The Municipal Commissioner of Ahmedabad is appointed by Gujarat Government to manage affairs of city of Ahmedabad. The terms of office is 3 years, which may be extended to further period of 3 years by government.

The Incumbent Municipal commissioner is Mukesh Kumar, IAS Officer.

== List of Municipal Commissioners of Ahmedabad ==
Sr No	Name	From	to
1	B P Patel	1 July 1950	4 May 1954
2	M D Rajpal	5 May 1954	4 May 1957
3	K M Kantawala	5 May 1957	4 May 1960
4	F J Heredia	5 May 1960	28 September 1961
5	M D Rajpal	29 September 1961	23 May 1964
6	R M Desai	24 May 1964	1 May 1965
7	S K Gangopadhyay	2 May 1965	31 March 1966
8	H K L Capoor	1 April 1966	31 August 1968
9	P B Mehta	1 September 1968	15 April 1971
10	G N Dike	16 April 1971	15 August 1973
11	S K Gangopadhyay	16 August 1973	11 March 1974
12	C C Doctor	12 March 1974	1 September 1974
13	R R Basu	2 September 1974	9 January 1976
14	R K Anklesaria	10 January 1976	31 May 1979
15	V Krishnamurthy	1 June 1979	14 September 1980
16	K Ramamoothy	15 September 1980	28 February 1992
17	P V Bhatt	1 March 1992	1 May 1993
18	R Basu	2 May 1983	21 April 1986
19	N M Bijlani	22 April 1986	6 March 1989
20	K Ramamoothy	7 March 1989	10 September 1989
21	P Basu	11 September 1989	8 April 1992
22	P K Ghosh	9 April 1992	31 October 1994
23	K S Verma	1 November 1994	27 September 1997
24	B K Sinha	27 September 1997	24 June 1999
25	K Kailashnathan	24 June 1999	18 October 2001
26	P Panneervel	18 October 2001	7 May 2003
27	R K Tripathy	7 May 2003	27 January 2005
28	Anil Mukim	27 January 2005	19 June 2006
29	I P Gautam	19 June 2006	12 July 2011
30	Guruprasad Mohapatra	12 July 2011	9 October 2014
31	D Thara	9 October 2014	24 June 2016
32	Mukesh Kumar	24 June 2016	15 July 2018
33	Vijay Nehra	16 July 2018	17 May 2020
34	Mukesh Kumar	17 May 2020	28 December 2021
35	Lochan Sehra	29 December 2021	11 October 2022
36	M Thennarasan	12 October 2022	31 January 2025
37	Banchhanidhi Pani	1 February 2025	
