= Lal Ram Saran Singh =

Indian diplomat

Lal Ram Saran Singh (IAST: Lāl Rām Śaran Singh) was an Indian diplomat. He was the India's Ambassador to Italy and at the same time India's High Commissioner to Malta during the 1960s. He also served as Chief commissioner of the State of Pondicherry before its de jure transfer. (Note: The State of Pondicherry comprised ex-French settlements of India after their de facto transfer in October 1954: Pondicherry, Karikal, Mahe and Yanam.)

== Offices held ==
Preceded by Moti Kripalani	Chief commissioner of State of Pondicherry; 30 August 1958 – 8 February 1961	Succeeded by Sisir Kumar Dutta

== See also ==
- List of lieutenant governors of Puducherry
