= K.M. Chandy =

K. Mani Chandy may refer to:

- K. Mani Chandy (born 1944), American computer scientist
- K.M. Chandy (politician) (1921–1998), Indian politician
