= Chhedi Lal =

Indian politician

3rd Lieutenant Governor of Puducherry
- In office 8 November 1972 – 29 August 1976
- Preceded by: B.D. Jatti
- Succeeded by: B.T. Kulkarni

Chhedilal (also written Chhedi Lal) was the third Lieutenant Governor of Puducherry Union Territory in India. He succeeded Basappa Danappa Jatti in the Third Assembly and was Lieutenant Governor in Fourth Assembly.

== Titles held ==
Preceded by Basappa Danappa Jatti	Lt. Governor of Puducherry; 8 November 1972 – 29 August 1976	Succeeded by B.T. Kulkarni

== See also ==
- Governor (India)
- List of current Indian governors
