= Kewal Singh Choudhary =

Indian diplomat (1915–1991)

Kewal Singh

Foreign Secretary of India
- In office 4 December 1972 - 31 March 1976
- Preceded by: Triloki Nath Kaul
- Succeeded by: Jagat Singh Mehta

Kewal Singh Choudhary (1915–1991) was an Indian diplomat, Foreign Secretary and India's ambassador to the USSR, Indian High Commissioner to Pakistan and USA. He was a 1955 recipient of the Indian civilian honour of Padma Shri.

== Early life and education ==
Kewal Singh was born into a Sikh family in the Lyallpur District of West Punjab on June 1, 1915. He was educated at the Forman Christian College, Lahore, the Law College, Lahore and at the Balliol College of Oxford University. He joined the Indian Civil Service in 1939 and served in Punjab in administrative positions until Independence after which he opted for the Indian Foreign Service. Between 1944 and 1946 he served as Colonization Officer, Nilibar. Then he served as district magistrate at Shahpur and Simla for the years 1946-47 and 1947-48 respectively.

== Diplomatic career ==
Kewal Singh served as First secretary of Indian Embassy in Turkey between 1948 and 1949. Then served in Indian military mission, Berlin during 1949–51. Later, he was appointed Indian Consul-General to French Indian enclaves (Note: In French India, the Indian consulate was located in the 7 rue de Capucins (now renamed as Rue Romain Rolland), Pondicherry.) in October 1953 succeeding R. K. Tandon (Note: R.K. Tandon himself succeeded S. K. Banerjee as the Consul General of India in French India on June 10, 1950. The inaugural Consul-General for India in the French Establishments in India at Pondicherry was Mirza Rashid Ali Baig who held the post between 1947 and 1949.) and stayed in that position until the French ceded them to India in 1954. He also played prominent role in their integration into the Indian union. In the same year he became the Chief Commissioner of the State of Pondicherry and served until November 1956. He later served at Indian missions in Stockholm, London and in Germany.

Kewal Singh was India's Ambassador to Portugal in 1962 when India's annexation of Goa led to diplomatic relations between Lisbon and New Delhi being severed, while as High Commissioner to Pakistan in 1965, he similarly had to leave that country after the breaking off of diplomatic relations following the Indo-Pak War of 1965.

He served as India's ambassador to the USSR from 1966 to 1968, and as Ambassador to the United States from 1976 to 1977. He succeeded T. N. Kaul as foreign secretary, serving from November 1972 to October 1976. India took over Sikkim, its protectorate, following prolonged internal disturbances there while Singh was foreign secretary. During his tenure, India signed an agreement for demarcating the maritime boundary with Sri Lanka and led a series of talks with the then Pakistani Foreign Secretary Agha Shahi on normalising communications and travel between the two countries.

== Death and legacy ==
Following his retirement as the ambassador to USA, Kewal Singh taught at the UCLA and at Kentucky University's Patterson School of Diplomacy and International Commerce where he was distinguished world statesman in residence until his death in 1991.He is survived by two children Mohinder and Gita. He authored a book, Partition and Aftermath: Memoirs of an Ambassador.

== Offices held ==
Preceded by R.K. Tandon	Consul-General of India to the French Establishments in India; October 1953 – 31 October 1954	Succeeded by Consulate Abolished (Chief commissioner of French Establishments in India)
Preceded by Georges Escargueil (Gouverneur Général de l'Inde française)	Chief commissioner of French Establishments in India (Note: In January 1955, The Indian union government by an order renamed the four French settlements in India as State of Pondicherry.); 1 November 1954 (Note: Appointed immediately by the Government of India after the Kizhoor referendum that was held on 21 October.) – 16 November 1956	Succeeded by Moti Kripalani
Preceded by N.A.	Ambassador of India to Denmark (Note: Resident in Stockholm) c.1959 – 1962	Succeeded by N.A.
Preceded by N.A.	Ambassador of India to Finland (Note: Resident in Stockholm) c.1959 – 1962	Succeeded by N.A.
Preceded by N.A.	Ambassador of India to Sweden c.1959 – 1962	Succeeded by N.A.
Preceded by T. N. Kaul	Deputy High Commissioner of India to the United Kingdom; 1962 – 1965	Succeeded by P. N. Haksar
Preceded by G. Parthasarathi	High Commissioner of India to the Pakistan; 1965 – 1966	Succeeded by S. Sen
Preceded by T. N. Kaul	Ambassador of India to Russia; 1966 – 1968	Succeeded by Durga Prasad Dhar
Preceded by N.A.	Ambassador of India to Mongolia; 1968 – 1969	Succeeded by N.A.
Preceded by Khub Chand	Ambassador of India to Germany; 1970 – 1972	Succeeded by Y. K. Puri
Preceded by T. N. Kaul	Foreign Secretary of India; 4 December 1972 – 31 March 1976	Succeeded by J. S. Mehta
Preceded by T. N. Kaul	Ambassador of India to the United States; 1976 – 1977	Succeeded by Nanabhoy Palkhivala

== See also ==
- List of lieutenant governors of Puducherry
- List of consuls general of India in the French India
- List of ambassadors of India to Russia
- List of ambassadors of India to the United States
- List of Padma Shri award recipients (1954–1959)

== Notes ==
Diplomatic posts
Preceded by Triloki Nath Kaul	Foreign Secretary of India; 1972 - 1976	Succeeded by Jagat Singh Mehta
