= Moti Kripalani =

Indian civil servant

Moti K. Kripalani (IAST: Motī K Kripalāni), ICS, was an Sindhi Indian civil servant who went to serve as Chief Commissioner of Ajmer and Pondicherry.

== Chief Commissioner of Pondicherry ==
The state of Pondicherry comprised ex-French settlements in India after their de facto transfer in October 1954. Kripalani succeeded Kewal Singh as the chief commissioner of Pondicherry on 16 November 1956. The political musings of 1st Pondicherry Representative Assembly during its tenure became quite a sensation, and they caught the attention of then Prime Minister Jawaharlal Nehru and others. Some of his decisions were criticized by political leaders of Pondicherry, who rued that delay in de jure transfer (Note: The de facto transfer of French settlements in India occurred in November 1954. In January 1955, The Indian union government by an order renamed the four French settlements in India as State of Pondicherry. A treaty of cession was signed between India and France in 1956. However, the Algerian war delayed the ratification of 1956 treaty by French parliament which finally happened during August 1962. This had some implications on the political and administrative aspects of the State of Pondicherry.) is one of the main reasons as the Pondicherry assembly had only an advisory role and the Chief Commissioner could take decisions overriding the assembly.

== Joint Secretary of the Commerce and Labor Department ==
He also served as Joint Secretary of the Commerce and Labour Department. During this period, only he was appointed by Bengal Governor Herbert to assist L.G. Pinnell to pursue the policy of denial in Bengal.

== Autobiography ==
He has recounted some important events in his life and civil service in his book Some Memories of Old Bengal. In that book, he mentions that as a higher civil servant in those days, he pursued particular hobbies and other recreational activities during his posting in Rajshahi (now in Bangladesh).

== Offices held ==
Preceded by Chandrakant Balwantrao Nagarkar	Chief commissioner of Ajmer; March 1946 – 31 October 1956	Succeeded by Gurumukh Nihal Singh (Governor of Rajasthan)
Preceded by Kewal Singh	Chief commissioner of State of Pondicherry; 16 November 1956 – 27 August 1958	Succeeded by Lal Ram Saran Singh

== See also ==
- Ajmer State
- List of lieutenant governors of Puducherry
