= List of consuls general of India in the French India =

The Indian consul-general to the French Establishments in India (French India) was the chief diplomatic representative of India to the French Republic for the French Establishments in India housed in the 7 rue de Capuchins, Pondicherry. It was created after Indian independence in 1947 and existed until the de facto transfer of the French possessions to India on 1 November 1954.

The inaugural consul-general for India in the French Establishments in India at Pondicherry was Mirza Rashid Ali Baig who held the post between 1947 and 1949. This consulate had jurisdiction over the Portuguese possessions in India as well The last diplomat who hold this office was Kewal Singh who took charge as Chief Commissioner shortly before the de facto transfer in 1954.

== List of consuls-general ==
No.	Name	Took office	Left office
2	Mirza Rashid Ali Baig	circa 1947	November 1949
2	S.K. Banerjee	31 November 1949	June 1950
3	R.K. Tandon	10 June 1950	circa October 1953
4	Kewal Singh	circa October 1953	21 October 1954

== Cessation of consulate ==
De facto transfer of the French Establishments in India occurred on 1 November 1954. A chief commissioner, appointed by Government of India, replaced the last French Commissioner of French India, Georges Escargueil. Then consul-general Kewal Singh was appointed as the first chief commissioner of French Establishments in India, immediately after the Kizhoor referendum, on 21 October 1954, as per Foreign Jurisdiction Act, 1947. The chief commissioner had the powers of the former French commissioner, but was under the direct control of the Union Government.

== See also ==
- Puducherry
- List of lieutenant governors of Puducherry
