= Triloki Nath Kaul =

Indian diplomat (1913-2000)

Foreign Secretary of India
- In office 7 November 1968 - 3 December 1972
- Preceded by: Rajeshwar Dayal
- Succeeded by: Kewal Singh

Triloki Nath Kaul (1913 – January 16, 2000) was one of India's foremost diplomats in the 20th century. A member of the Indian Civil Service (ICS), he served in the foreign service branch, culminating in his being appointed Foreign Secretary twice. He served as Ambassador of India to the Soviet Union and as the Indian Ambassador to the United States.

== Life ==
Kaul was born in 1913 in Baramulla, Kashmir, and was educated initially in Kashmir and later at University of the Punjab, University of Allahabad. He later studied at King's College London and was awarded Master of Laws from University of London. In January 2000, he died at age 86 due to cardiac arrest at his orchard in Rajgarh.

== Career ==
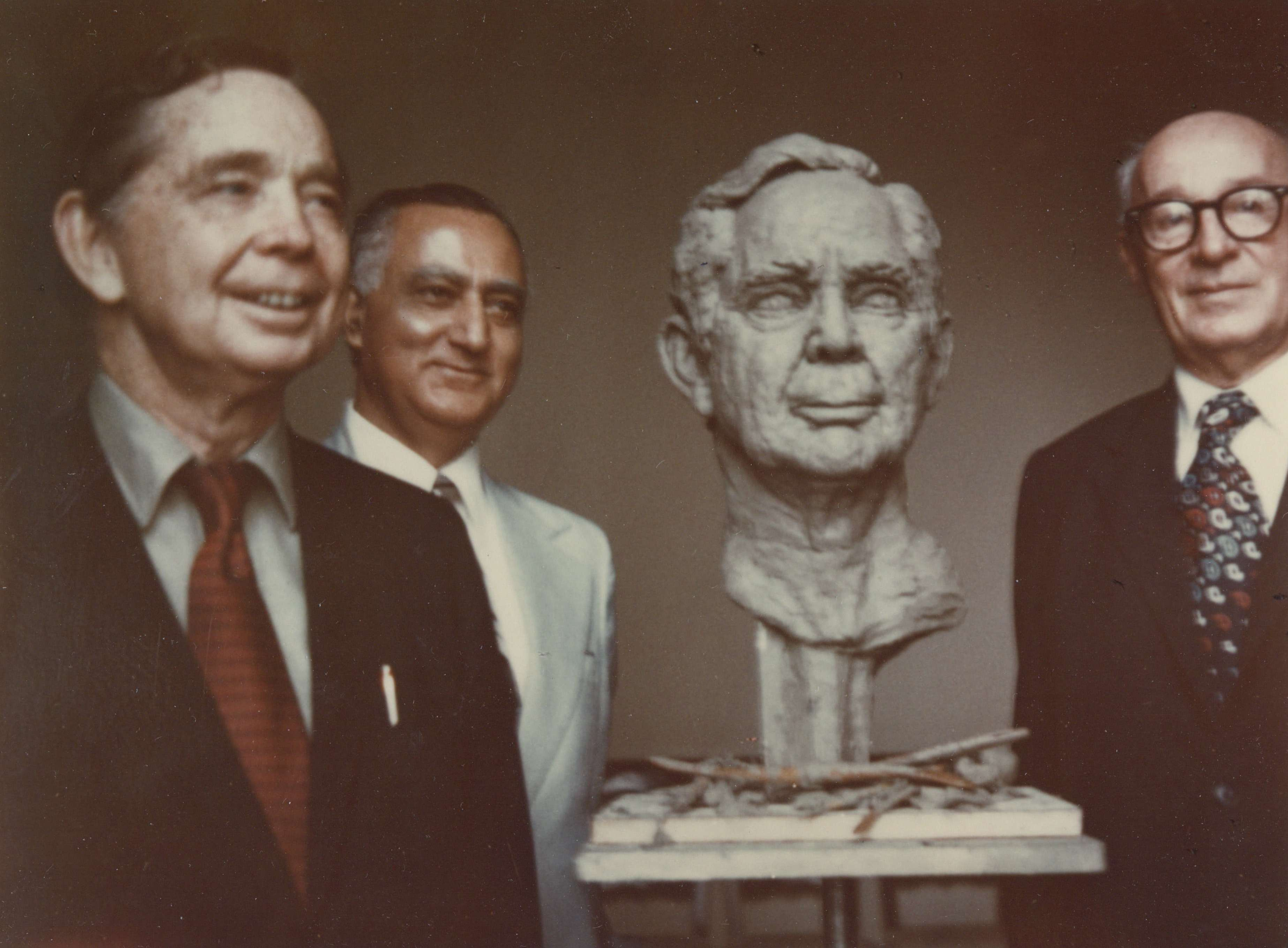
Ambassador Triloki Nath Kaul from the Embassy of India with Carl Albert and Melvin Price.

He joined the Indian Civil Service in 1939 and later at independence in 1947 he became a member of the Indian Foreign Service (see his *Reminiscences*). He served as Ambassador of India to the Soviet Union, U.S., and China, as well as being Deputy High Commissioner and acting High Commissioner to the UK, and Foreign Secretary to the Indian Ministry of External Affairs. He was also the Vice-Chairman of the Indian unit of the UNESCO and Chairman of the Indian Council for Cultural Relations. He was Indian ambassador to Moscow first during his active diplomatic service in the Indian Foreign Ministry in 1962–1966, at the height of the Cold War, and once again after his retirement in 1986–1989, this time ambassador with a Cabinet rank.

As a young diplomat, he suggested greater collaboration with Moscow, a policy that was rejected by Nehru who was more inclined to China. "I recall our informal conversation in 1951 with Kapitzan, (Soviet Counsellor in Peking at that time), when we discussed, without the authorization of our respective governments and ambassadors, the possibility of an agreement for mutual cooperation and non-aggression between India and the USSR ... When Pannikar (Indian Ambassador in Peking) informed Delhi, Delhi's reaction was cool."

In the absence of such a pact, Chinese broke the 1954 Panch Sheel Agreement and attacked India in 1962.

Besides his diplomatic career, he lectured widely on international peace and security issues at various universities all over the world.. After his retirement, he served for a few years as editor of World Affairs, a journal published from New Delhi.

== Assessment by Moynihan ==
Kaul was not much liked in the United States, due to his reputation as being pro-Soviet. When he was named the new ambassador to the US by PM Indira Gandhi in 1973, then US ambassador to India, Daniel Patrick Moynihan, wrote a strongly negative assessment of the “sly” nature of Kaul, according to US cables available from WikiLeaks.

In a cable, sent on March 17, 1973, Moynihan wrote, “Kaul, like Nehru family, is a Kashmiri Brahmin, self-assured to point of arrogance by birth. His career, as ambassador to Moscow and recently as foreign secretary, has been marked by pro- Soviet bias and concomitant anti-American words and deeds.” However, Kaul was also called a sensitive weathervane of Indian foreign policy, enjoying Gandhi’s confidence while foreign secretary. “Thus, he will seek to improve relations with United States, if that is GOI policy, and will criticize our actions, if so instructed,” he said in an otherwise negative assessment of the ambassador, who was to help improve the Indo-US ties that had deteriorated during the 1971 war. “Hopefully, his sense of mission will overcome or mitigate his brahmanical disdain for “materialistic” American and his previous Moscow orientation,” Moynihan said. “I have not yet met him, but all here agree he inclined toward slyness, especially in his dealings with westerners. This latter quality is not only Kashmiri brahaminacal arrogance, it also reflects Kaul’s propensity for misconstruing cleverness for sophistication in diplomatic dealings. As the British say, he is “too clever by half”, a characteristic which many Western chiefs of mission here have found distasteful and trying. The US ambassador said one NATO ambassador “upon hearing of Kaul’s appointment, seized an embassy officer by the lapels and suggested the United States could not possibly extend agreement to Kaul. He alluded to Kaul’s pro-Soviet orientation and his frequent anti-American comments. He quoted former US ambassador to Russia, Foy Kohler, as saying about Kaul: “Not ideologically pro-Soviet as such, but rather a slick ambitious opportunist who, having attained status as a specialist on Communist affairs, has hitched his wagon to the star of improved Indo-Soviet relations.”

This assessment should be taken in context that during the 1970s the relations between United States and the former Soviet Union were hostile at best. And the assessment is a reflection of American sentiments and not truly reflect the works of Kaul.

== Major works ==
Kaul was the author of several books on foreign policy.

Some of his works include:

- Diplomacy in Peace & War: Recollections and Reflections (1978)
- India, China, and Indochina, Reflections of a Liberated Diplomat (1980)
- Life in a Himalayan Hamlet (1982)
- My Years through Raj and Swaraj (1993)
- A Diplomat’s Diary (1947–1999) (2000)

== See also ==
- Navtej Sarna
- Syed Akbaruddin
- Taranjit Singh Sandhu
- Harsh Vardhan Shringla

Political offices
| Preceded by Rajeshwar Dayal | Foreign Secretary; 1968-1972 | Succeeded by Kewal Singh |
| Preceded by L.K. Jha | Indian Ambassador to the United States; 1973-1976 | Succeeded by Kewal Singh |
