= S. L. Silam =

Indian politician

Sayaji Laxman Silam (born 18 May 1896) was the first Lieutenant Governor of Puducherry Union Territory in India. He was Lt. Governor for First and Second assemblies of Puducherry Union Territory (U.T.).

He was member of Legislative Assembly of Bombay State elected during 1951 and 1957 elections. He was also Speaker of Bilingual Bombay State Assembly from 21 November 1956 to 16 June 1957. After the 1957 elections he continued as Speaker until 30 April 1960. He also became Speaker of First Assembly of Maharashtra Vidhan Sabha from 1 May 1960 until 14 March 1962.

He was born on 18 May 1896 in Mumbai, although his family lived in Karkheli, Nanded District, Maharashtra (then part of Nizam empire). Education (BA and LLB degrees). He was actively involved in the Indian freedom struggle and was jailed for 3 years from 1942 to 1945 during the non-cooperation movement. He held various posts in Mumbai municipal cooperation. He was elected as an MLA from Mumbai for the first time in 1942. He was also an editor of the Telugu mitra publication.

== Notes ==
Preceded by None	Lt. Governor of Puducherry; 14 October 1963–13 October 1968	Succeeded by B.D. Jatti
