= Mohan Sinha Mehta =

Indian educationist and diplomat (1895–1986)

Mohan Singh Mehta
- Born: 20 April 1895; Bhilwara, Rajasthan, India
- Died: 25 June 1986 (aged 91)
- Education: Agra College, Agra; Allahabad University; London School of Economics
- Occupations: Educator, Diplomat, Social Worker
- Known for: Founder of Vidya Bhawan and Seva Mandir
- Notable work: Lord Hastings and the Indian States (1929)
- Spouse: Hulas Kumari Mehta
- Children: Jagat Singh Mehta
- Awards: Distinguished Service Awards from Mewar State Government (1940 and 1945); Padma Vibhushan (1969); William Trolley Award from Syracuse University, U.S. (1969); Indian National Federation of UNESCO Associations Award (1979); Special Award from the Asian and South Pacific Bureau of Adult Education (1972); G.D. Parikh Memorial Award (1980); Honored by the Indian University Association for Continuing Education, New Delhi (1985)

Mohan Singh Mehta (1895–1986) was founder of Vidya Bhavan group of institutions and Seva Mandir.

== Life ==
Mohan Singh Mehta was born in Bhilwara, Rajasthan, on 20 April 1895 to Jeewan Singh Mehta. His wife’s name was Hulas Kumari Mehta and he had one son, Jagat Singh Mehta, who became Foreign Secretary in the Government of India.

Mehta held a B.A. degree from Agra College, Agra (1916), an M.A. (Economics) from Allahabad University (1918), and both L.L.B. (1919) and Ph.D. degrees awarded by the London School of Economics (1927). He was admitted as a Barrister-at-Law by the Middle Temple in 1927.

== Publications ==
Mehta wrote Lord Hastings and the Indian States, published in 1929.
