= B. N. Adarkar =

Governor of the Reserve Bank of India (1910–1998)

Bhaskar Namdeo Adarkar, MBE (Order of the British Empire)

Governor of the Reserve Bank of India

Order of the British Empire
- In office 4 May 1970 – 15 June 1970
- Preceded by: L. K. Jha
- Succeeded by: Sarukkai Jagannathan

Personal details
- Born: 18 May 1910 Vengurla, Bombay Presidency, India
- Died: 20 March 1988
- Education: M.A.
- Occupation: Economist, Banker
- Known for: Governor, RBI; Executive Director, IMF

Bhaskar Namdeo Adarkar MBE (18 May 1910 – 20 March 1998) was the ninth governor of the Reserve Bank of India from 4 May 1970 to 15 June 1970. His term was the second-shortest (42 days) after Amitav Ghosh who had served for only 20 days. His term was short since he was filling in as interim before S. Jaganathan took over.

== Professional career ==
Unlike his predecessors who were from the Indian Civil Service, Adarkar was an economist and had served in the office of the Economic Adviser of the Government of India. Prior to that he had held various important positions in the Ministry of Commerce & Industry. He was appointed a Member of the Order of the British Empire (MBE) in the 1946 New Year Honours. He was the Deputy Governor of the Reserve Bank before filling in as interim Governor. In March 1947 before Indian independence he was appointed by the Government of India to create a health insurance scheme for industrial workers. A year later the report he submitted became the basis for the Employment State Insurance (ESI) Act of 1948.

== Major contributions ==
During his tenure the Indian Rupee notes of denominations ₹ 2, 5, 10, and 100, commemorating the birth centenary of Mahatma Gandhi was reissued on 24 August 1970, these notes bear his signature, the earlier issue bears the signature of L. K. Jha. Due to his short interim term his signature does not appear on any other Indian rupee notes. Due to their relative rarity, banknotes bearing his signature are sold at a huge premium in grey market. A five rupee banknote signed by him sells at rupees 300 to 500.

In March 1947, before India's independence, Adarkar had submitted a report to Government on health insurance scheme for industrial workers. Later this report became the basis of the Employees' State Insurance Act, 1948. Adarkar also served as India's Executive Director at the International Monetary Fund. As Deputy Governor, RBI he was involved in the establishment of the National Institute of Bank Management.
