= Ram Kishore Vyas =

Lt Governor of Pondicherry
- In office 1980 - 1981

4th Speaker of the Rajasthan Legislative Assembly
- In office 1972 - 1977
- Preceded by: Niranjan Nath Acharya
- Succeeded by: Laxman Singh

Personal details
- Party: Indian National Congress

Pandit Ram Kishore Vyas was a freedom fighter and senior Indian National Congress leader from Rajasthan. Born to Pandit Laduram on 23 May 1908 in Jaipur. He held various offices including Lt Governor of Pondicherry in 1980 and 4th Speaker of Rajasthan Legislative Assembly from 1972 to 1977, Home Minister of Rajasthan, President of Rajasthan Pradesh Congress Committee thrice.

He represented the Hawamahal and Chomu Rajasthan assembly constituencies twice each. He died of a heart attack on 16 April 1981 in Jaipur and was cremated with full state honours. Buta Singh, the Home Minister of India paid a floral tribute on behalf of Prime Minister Indira Gandhi. His sons Ramakant Vyas and Radhey Kant Sharma held various posts in RPCC including Vice President in 2008 and General secretary in 1998 and Radhey Kant Sharma was an IAS officer who was accused of corruption charges but case was later abated in 2017 because he died in 2011 at the age of 86 years. His grandson Rupesh Kant Vyas is working as General Secretary of Rajasthan State Congress since February 2016.
