= Rajani Rai =

Indian politician

Rajani Rai (born 14 February 1931) was a former Lieutenant Governor of Puducherry and an academic. She was governor from 23 April 1998 to 29 July 2002. She was from Nagpur, Maharashtra. She was a member and leader of the Bharatiya Jana Sangh and Bharatiya Janata Party. She died on 29 August 2013.
