= B. D. Jatti =

Vice President of India from 1974 to 1979

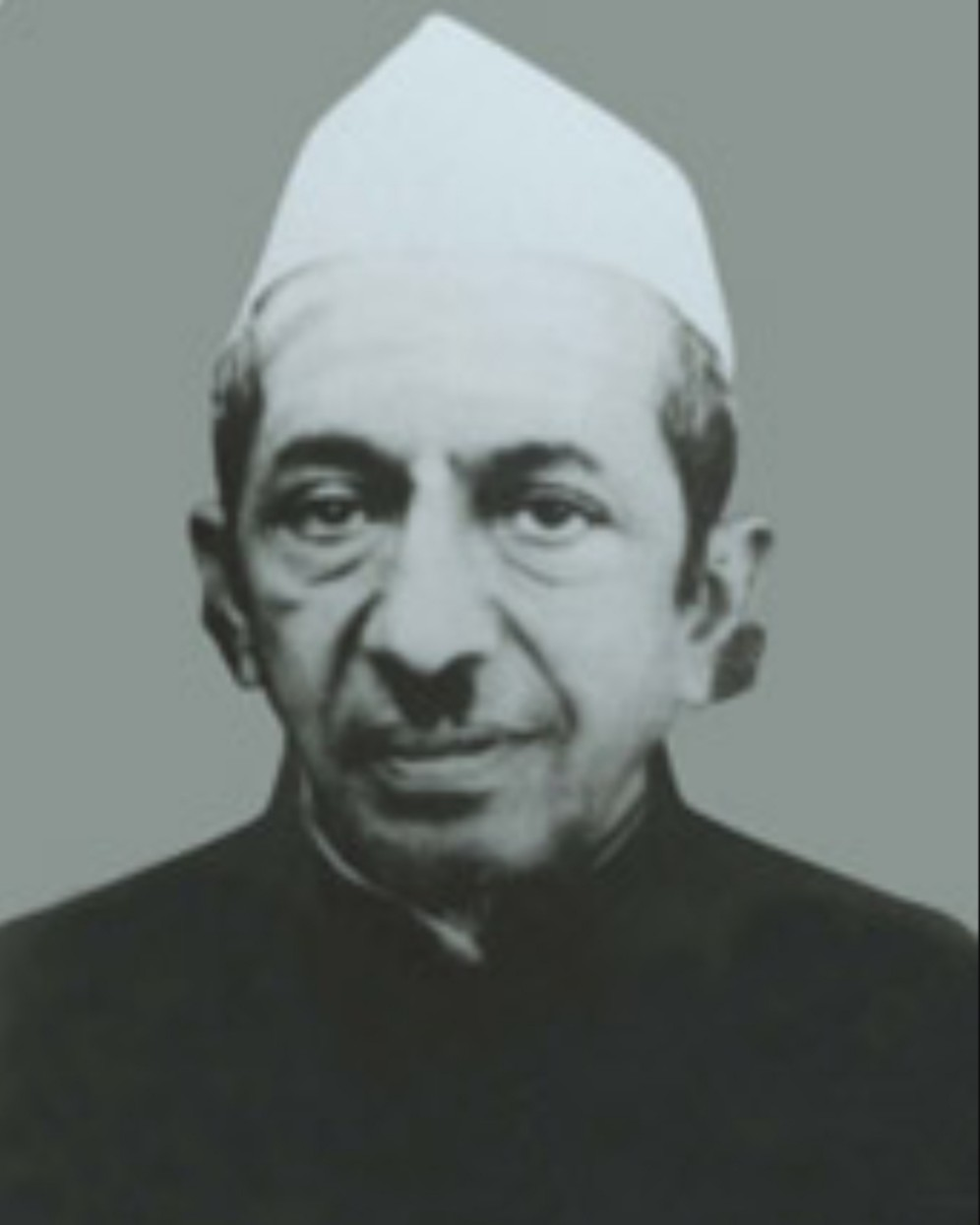
- Office portrait, 1975

Acting (Interim) President of India
- Acting; 11 February 1977 – 25 July 1977
- Prime Minister: Indira Gandhi; Morarji Desai
- Vice President: Himself
- Preceded by: Fakhruddin Ali Ahmed
- Succeeded by: Neelam Sanjiva Reddy

Vice President of India
- In office 31 August 1974 – 30 August 1979
- President: Fakhruddin Ali Ahmed; Himself (acting); Neelam Sanjiva Reddy
- Prime Minister: Indira Gandhi; Morarji Desai
- Preceded by: Gopal Swarup Pathak
- Succeeded by: Mohammad Hidayatullah

Governor of Odisha
- In office 8 November 1972 – 20 August 1974
- Chief Minister: Nandini Satpathy
- Preceded by: Sardar Jogendra Singh; Gati Krushna Misra (acting)
- Succeeded by: Gati Krushna Misra (acting); Akbar Ali Khan

Lieutenant Governor of Pondicherry
- In office 14 October 1968 – 7 November 1972
- Chief Minister: Hasan Farook
- Preceded by: S. L. Silam
- Succeeded by: Chhedi Lal

2nd Chief Minister of Mysore State
- In office 16 May 1958 – 9 March 1962
- Governor: Jayachamarajendra Wadiyar
- Preceded by: Siddavanahalli Nijalingappa
- Succeeded by: S. R. Kanthi

Member of the Karnataka Legislative Assembly
- In office 26 March 1952 – 12 October 1968
- Preceded by: Constituency established
- Succeeded by: S. M. Athani
- Constituency: Jamkhandi

Personal details
- Born: Basappa Danappa Jatti; 10 September 1912 Savalagi, Jamakhandi, Bombay Presidency, British India (present-day Karnataka, India)
- Died: 7 June 2002 (aged 89) Bangalore, Karnataka, India (present-day Bengaluru)
- Party: Indian National Congress
- Education: Rajaram College
- Occupation: Politician

Basappa Danappa Jatti (10 September 1912 – 7 June 2002) was the vice president of India, serving from 1974 to 1979. He was the acting president of India from 11 February to 25 July 1977. He also served as the chief minister of Karnataka. Jatti rose from a being a Municipality member to India's second-highest office during a five-decade-long chequered political career.

== Early life ==
Jatti was born into a Banajiga family, a sub-sect of the Lingayat community, in Savalgi, Jamkhandi Taluk of Bagalkot district (formerly Bijapur district), Karnataka. on 10 September 1912. His parents were Danappa Jatti and Sangamma. Jatti studied at the PB High School Jamkhandi and obtained a Bachelor of Arts degree from Rajaram College and a degree in law from the Sykes Law College, Kolhapur. Jatti practiced as a lawyer for a while in Jamkhandi before being elected to the Jamkhandi municipality in 1940 and going on to become its president. He was elected to the Jamakhandi State Legislature, becoming a minister and subsequently its chief minister.

== Early political career ==
In 1940, he entered politics as a Municipality member at Jamkhandi and subsequently became the president of the Jamkhandi Town Municipality in 1945. Later, he was elected as a member of the Jamkhandi State Legislature and was appointed a minister in the government of the princely state of Jamkhandi. Finally, he became the 'dewan' (chief minister) of Jamkhandi state in 1948. As dewan, he maintained cordial relations with the Maharaja, Shankar Rao Patwardhan, and brought about the accession of the small principality to the Indian Union. On 8 March 1948 after Jamkhandi was merged with Bombay state, he returned to legal practice and continued with it for 20 months.

Later, Jatti was nominated as a member of the Bombay State Legislative Assembly to represent the merged area, and within a week of his nomination, he was appointed Parliamentary Secretary to the then Bombay chief minister, B. G. Kher. He worked in that capacity for a couple of years. After the 1952 general elections, he was appointed Minister of Health and Labour of the then Bombay government and held that post till the reorganization of states. His autobiography, 'I'm my own model', is very popular.

== Chief minister of Mysore state ==
Jatti became a member of the Mysore Legislative Assembly after the reorganization and was Chairman of the Land Reforms Committee, which paved the way for the 1961 Mysore Land Reforms Act (which abolished the tenancy system and absentee landlordism). He was the chief minister and Kadidal Manjappa was the revenue minister when the bill was adopted. In 1958, when S. Nijalingappa stepped down as chief minister of the state, Jatti was elected leader of the party in the face of a stiff challenge from Congress veteran T. Subramanya. He became the chief minister of Mysore in 1958 and continued in that office until 1962.

In the assembly election of 1962 to the Mysore Legislative Assembly, Jatti was reelected from Jamkhandi. He however was forced to resign as chief minister since he did not command the support of a majority of elected legislators of the Congress Party and was succeeded by S. R. Kanthi.

== Later political career ==
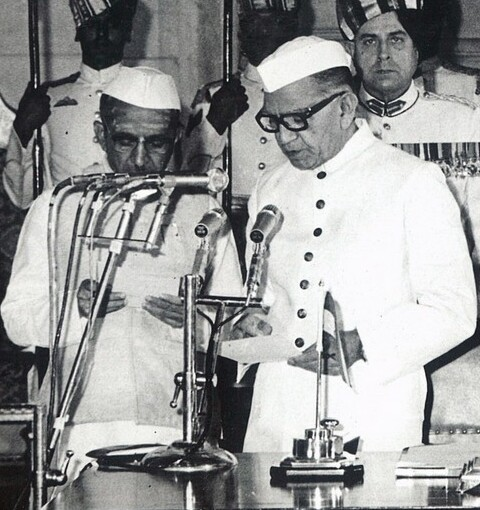
Jatti being sworn in as Vice President of India (1974)

Jatti subsequently was Lieutenant Governor of Pondicherry from October 1968 to November 1972. Jatti was appointed Governor of Orissa in November 1972. On 1 March 1973 the ruling Congress government led by Nandini Satpathy resigned after it lost its majority in the legislative assembly. Although the leader of the opposition, Biju Patnaik, staked his claim to form the government and demonstrated the support of a majority of legislators, Jatti chose to prorogue the assembly session on the advice of Sathpathy and on 3 March 1973 recommended President’s rule in the state. Jatti, with the aid of advisors administered the state during the period of President’s Rule which continued until March 1974. He resigned as governor in August 1974 to contest in the vice presidential election of 1974.

== Vice presidential election ==
In the election, Jatti defeated the opposition candidate N.E. Horo winning 521 votes in the electoral college against 141 polled by Horo. Jatti was declared elected on 27 August 1974 and sworn in as the vice president of India on 31 August 1974. Following the death in office of Fakhruddin Ali Ahmed on 11 February 1977, Jatti was sworn in as the acting president of India the same day. Following the defeat of the Indian National Congress in the general elections of 1977, Jatti asked Indira Gandhi to continue as caretaker prime minister and, on the recommendation of the Cabinet, revoked the Emergency on 21 March 1977. Jatti swore in Morarji Desai as prime minister on 24 March 1977. In April 1977, the new government recommended the dismissal of governments and the dissolution of legislative assemblies in states ruled by the Congress Party. Although Jatti initially hesitated to accept the Cabinet’s recommendation, he agreed to it a day later and dismissed governments in nine states. (Note: The order dismissing the state governments was challenged in the Supreme Court by six states. A seven-judge bench of the Court dismissed the appeals on 29 April 1977 without giving reasons and stating that these would be elaborated in separate judgments to follow. On 6 May 1977, in its judgement in the case of State of Rajasthan v. Union of India, Justice P. K. Goswami revealed that Jatti had met the Chief Justice of India, M. H. Beg, during the period between the Court's judgement and its detailed order and had raised the matter with the Chief Justice. In his judgement, Goswami condemned the conduct of President Jatti stating that he was parting with "the records with a cold shudder" and that he had "no option but to place this on record hoping that the majesty of the high office of the President, who should be beyond the high watermark of any controversy, suffers not in future". The observations of Justice Goswami were subsequently denied by Jatti and Justice Beg.) Jatti was succeeded by Neelam Sanjiva Reddy as President of India on 25 July 1977 following his unopposed election to the presidency in the presidential election of 1977.

== Public offices held ==
- 1945–48: Minister for Education in the erstwhile princely state of Jamkhandi
- 1948: Chief Minister (dewan) of Jamkhandi
- 1948–52: Parliamentary Secretary in the B. G. Kher Government in erstwhile Bombay State
- 1953–56: Deputy Minister for Health and Labour in the Morarji Desai Government in Bombay
- 1958–62: Chief Minister of Mysore state
- 1962–68: Cabinet minister, Government of Mysore
- 1968–72: Lieutenant Governor of Pondicherry
- 1972–74: Governor of Odisha
- 1974–79: Vice-President of India
- Acting President for six months in 1977

== Awards and honours ==
=== Foreign honours ===
- Nepal
  - King Birendra Investiture Medal (1975)

== Personal life and family ==
His great grandson Dhruv Jatti is a spokesperson of the Indian National Congress party and the founder of Indian Student Community, a non profit organization focused on empowering youth.

== Religious activities ==
A deeply religious man, Jatti was the founder president of the "Basava Samithi", a religious organisation which propagated the preachings of 12th-century saint, philosopher and reformer of Lingayat community Basaveshwara. The Basava samithi established in 1964 has published many books on Lingayatism and Sharanas and has got the 'vachanas' of sharanas translated into various languages. He was also involved in various organisations concerned with social activities.

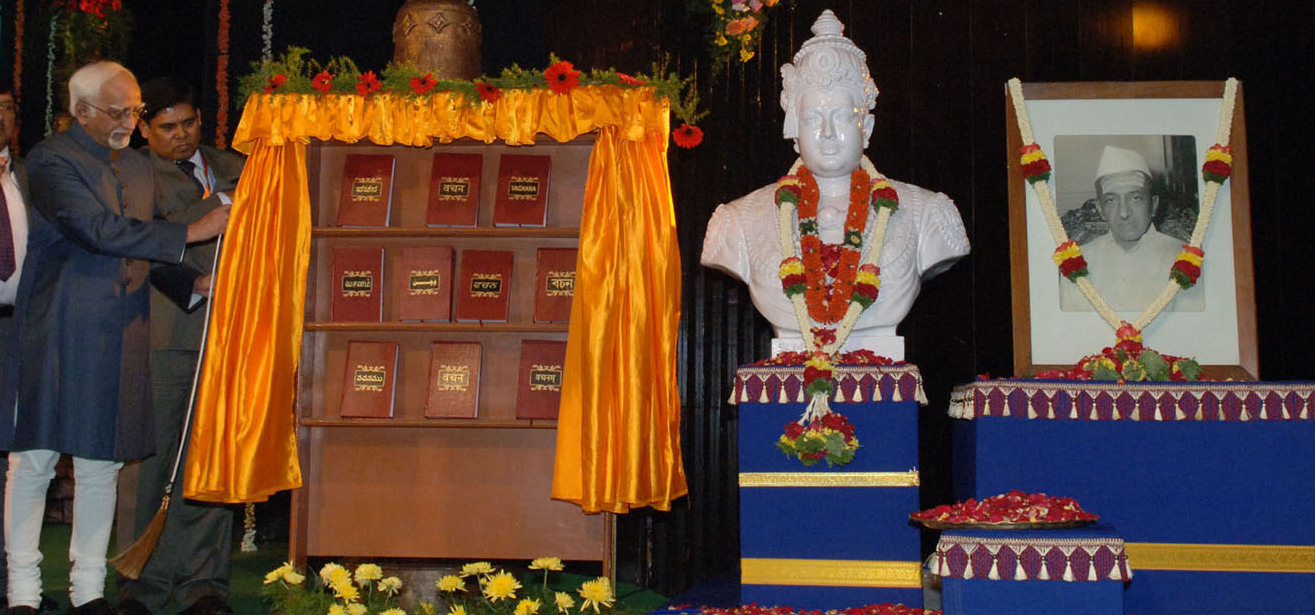
Vice President Ansari at the birth centenary celebrations of Vice President Jatti

== Death and legacy ==
He died on 7 June 2002. He was hailed as a man who set an example of selfless service and stood for value-based politics. He was once called an ordinary man with extraordinary thought, and he named his autobiography, I'm My Own Model. His centenary celebrations were held in 2012.

== See also ==
- List of chief ministers of Karnataka
- List of current Indian governors

== Notes ==
Political offices
Preceded by Siddavanahalli Nijalingappa	Chief Minister of Mysore; 1958–1962	Succeeded by S. R. Kanthi
Preceded by Sayaji Laxman Silam	Lieutenant Governor of Pondicherry; 1968–1972	Succeeded by Chhedilal
Preceded by Gatikrishna Mishra	Governor of Odisha; 1972–1974	Succeeded by Gatikrishna Mishra
Preceded by Gopal Swarup Pathak	Vice-President of India; 1974–1979	Succeeded by Mohammad Hidayatullah
Preceded by Fakhruddin Ali Ahmed	President of India; Acting; 1977	Succeeded by Neelam Sanjiva Reddy
