= Kuniyil Kailashnathan =

Lieutenant Governor of Puducherry (born 1953)

- കുനിയിൽ കൈലാസനാഥൻ
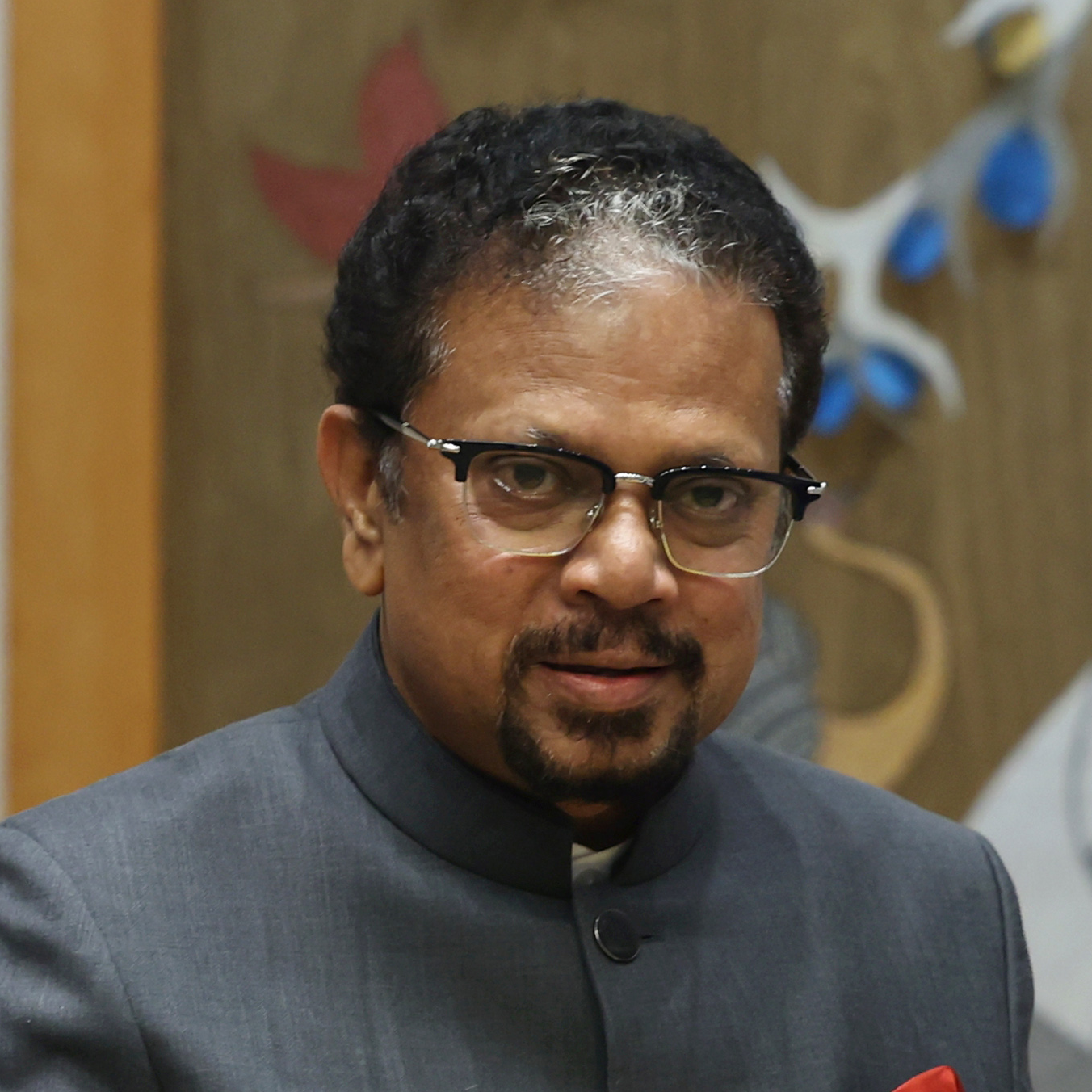

25th Lieutenant Governor of Puducherry
- Incumbent
- Assumed office 7 August 2024
- Chief Minister: N. Rangaswamy
- Preceded by: C. P. Radhakrishnan (additional charge)

Personal details
- Born: 25 May 1953 (age 73) Vadakara, Kerala, India
- Party: Independent
- Education: University of Wales; University of Madras
- Occupation: Retired IAS Officer

Kuniyil Kailashnathan (born 25 May 1953) is a retired IAS officer of the 1979-batch from Gujarat cadre. He is currently serving as the 25th Lieutenant Governor of Puducherry since 2024. Kailashnathan previously served as Additional Chief Secretary to then Gujarat Chief Minister Narendra Modi until 2013. He also served as Chief Principal Secretary of the Gujarat Chief Minister's Office until 30 June 2024.

== Early life and family ==
Kailashnathan's family hails from Vatakara, Kerala. He grew up in Ooty, where his father worked for the Postal Department.

== Education ==
Kailashnathan holds a Postgraduate Degree in Chemistry from Madras University and an MA in Economics from the University of Wales.

== Career ==
Kailashnathan started his career as an Assistant Collector Junior Timescale on 1 September 1981. He had served as Collector of Surendranagar (1985) and Surat (1987).

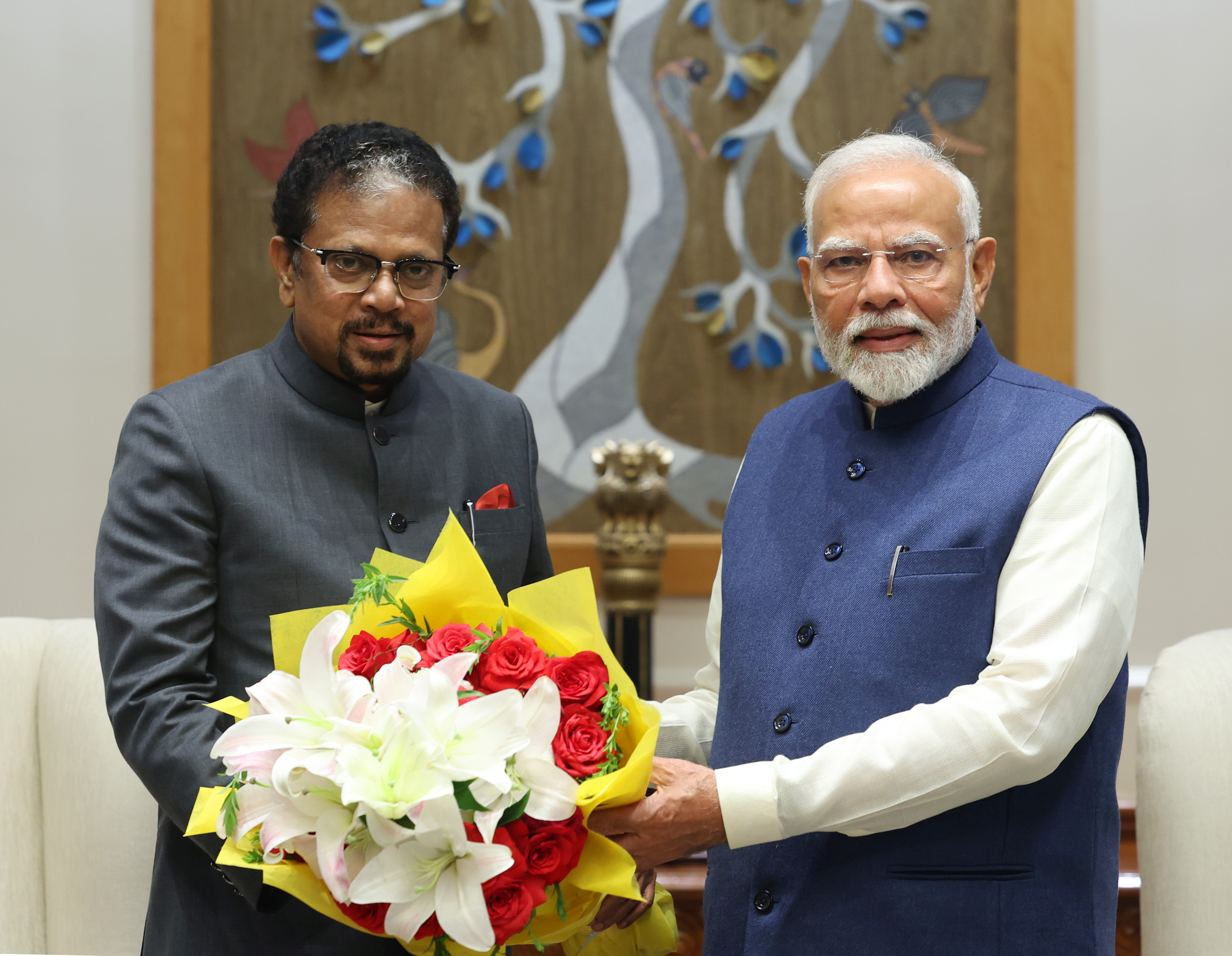
K. Kailashnathan with Narendra Modi

He had also been the Chief Executive Officer of Gujarat Maritime Board. In addition, Kailashnathan served as the Municipal Commissioner of Ahmedabad from 1999 to 2001. Kailashnathan was Chairman of the Ahmedabad Urban Development Authority (AUDA) and Principal Secretary of the Urban Development and Urban Housing Department of Gujarat (UDD). While at UDD, he chaired the Steering Committee that developed the Bus Rapid Transit Project for Ahmedabad.

After the January 26, 2001 earthquake, the Gujarat government set up the Water and Sanitation Management Organization (WASMO) to empower communities to manage local water systems. Kailashnathan, then serving as Secretary of Water Supply, was among WASMO's first Governing Body members, playing a crucial role in its foundational stages.

He retired as Additional Chief Secretary in the Gujarat Chief Minister's Office (CMO) on May 31, 2013, ending 33 years of service. However, he was retained in the CMO as Chief Principal Secretary, where he served until June 30, 2024. Kailashnathan has served under four Chief Ministers: Narendra Modi, Anandiben Patel, Vijay Rupani and Bhupendrabhai Patel.

Besides these, Kailashnathan served as Chairman of Sardar Sarovar Narmada Nigam Ltd. He was also the Chairman of the Executive Council of the Mahatma Gandhi Sabarmati Ashram Memorial Trust, overseeing the Gandhi Ashram Redevelopment Project.

Kailashnathan has also served as a Member of the Board of Directors for Gujarat State Petroleum Corporation Ltd. (GSPCL) and was also a member of the Governing Body of the UN Mehta Institute of Cardiology & Research Centre.

In his earlier roles, he played an important part in industrial development and privatizing ports in Gujarat. His contributions to the infrastructure sector include spearheading the establishment of a statewide drinking water pipeline grid in Gujarat and serving as managing director of Gujarat State Financial Services.

== Lieutenant Governor of Puducherry ==
Kailashnathan was sworn in as the Lieutenant Governor of Puducherry on 7 August 2024.
