= Seva Mandir =

Indian grassroot NGO

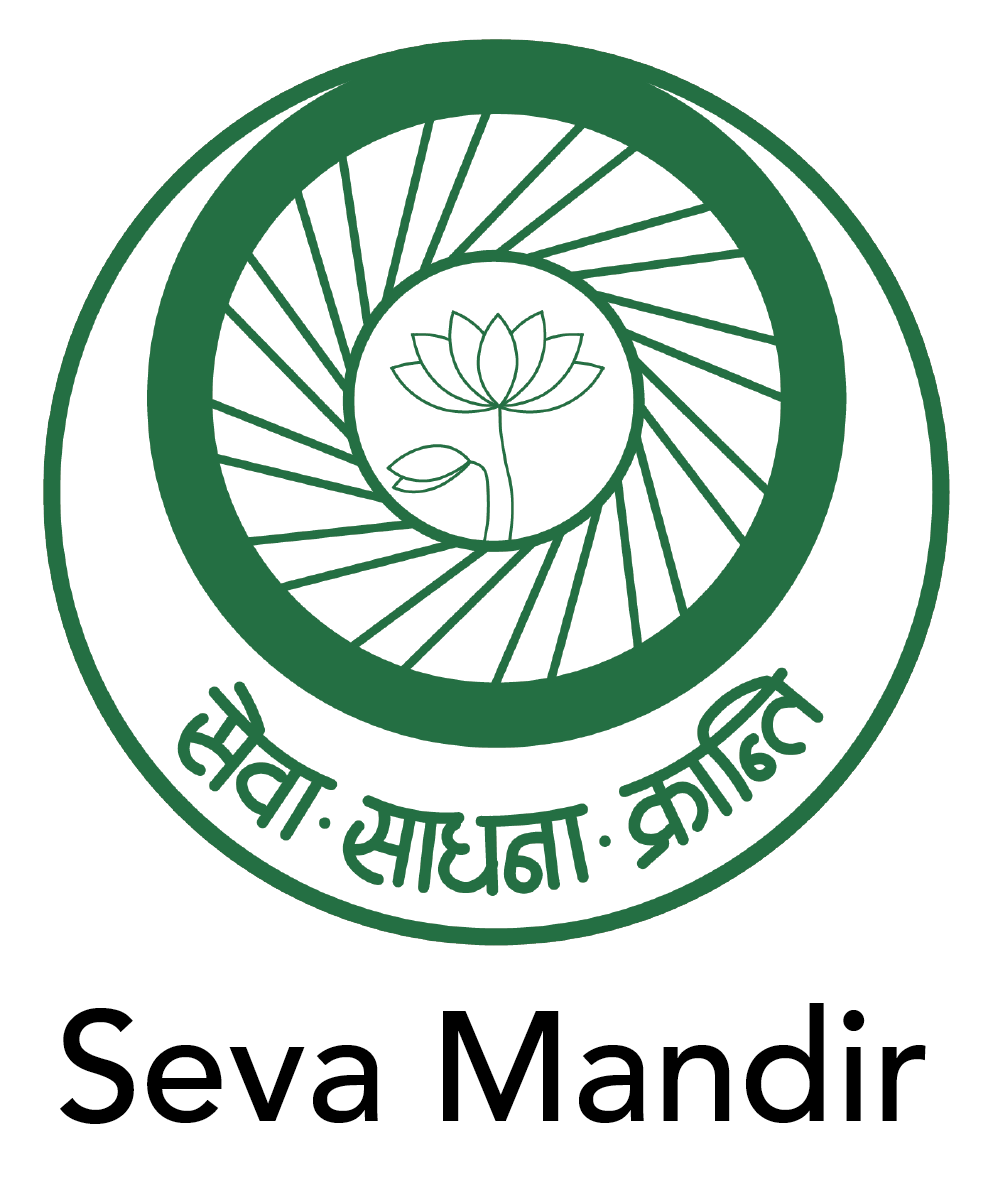
- Formation: 1968
- Type: Not for profit
- Purpose: Sustainable Development - Natural Resource Development, Livelihood Enhancement, Women Empowerment, Primary Education, Early Childcare and Nutrition, Youth Development, Village Institutions, Peri-Urban Governance
- Headquarters: India
- Location: Udaipur, Rajasthan, India
- Region served: Udaipur, Rajsamand, and Sirohi Districts, Rajasthan
- Staff: 400+
- Website: Seva Mandir

Seva Mandir is an Indian grassroot NGO based in Udaipur, in Rajasthan state, founded by Dr. Mohan Sinha Mehta in 1968. Seva Mandir works mainly in natural resource development and sustainability, village development, women empowerment, education and health care, continuing education, and children's welfare.

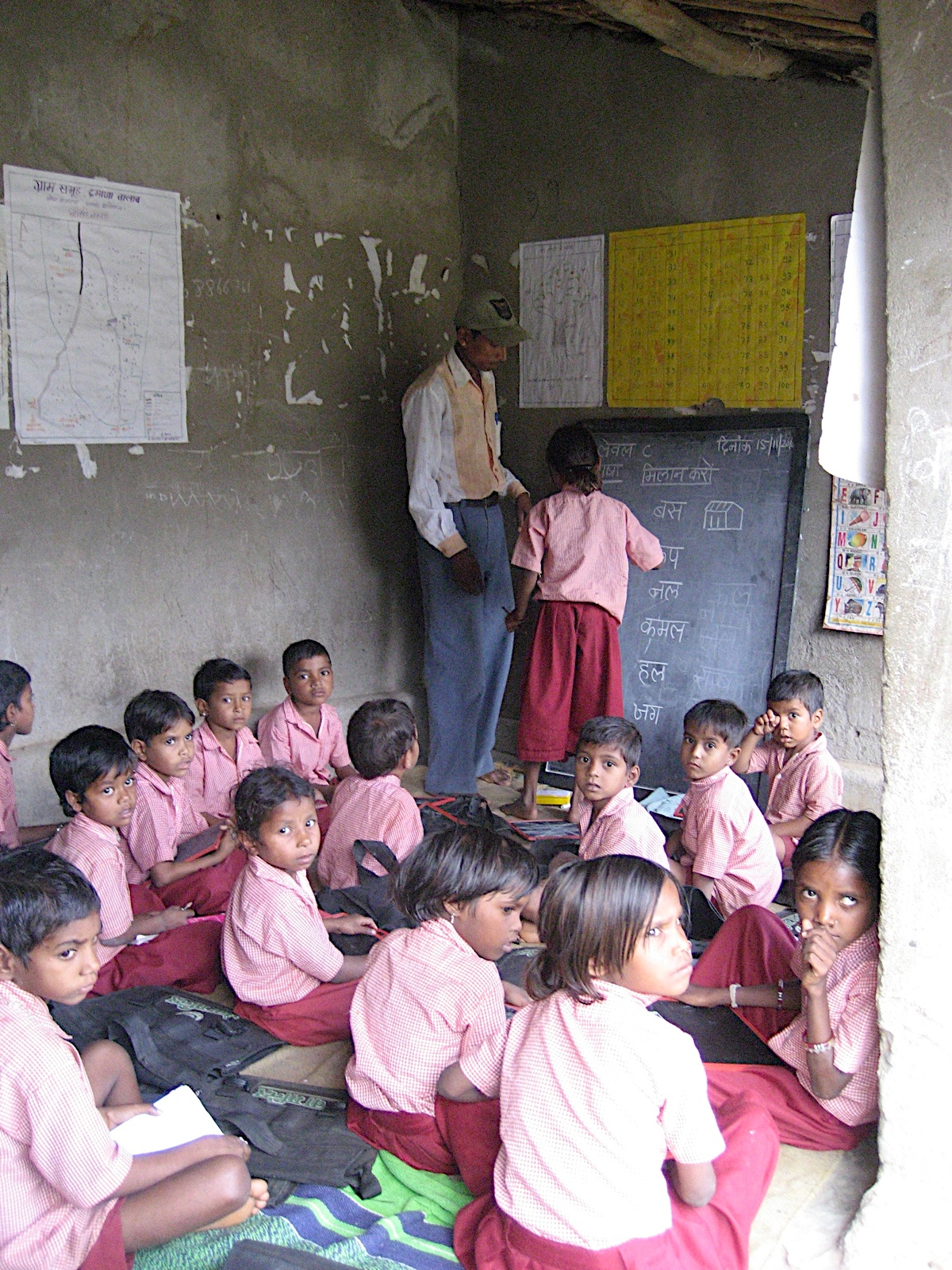
Seva Mandir Non-Formal Education Centre.

== History ==
Dr. Mohan Sinha Mehta (a distinguished Indian ambassador and civil servant) founded Seva Mandir in 1968. Initially, the focus of the organisation was to provide Adult Education, ensuring that they had the tools and knowledge to become leaders of their own development.

Between 1973 and 1976, an extreme drought in Udaipur district led Seva Mandir to expand its focus to encompass relief and agriculture extension services. Eventually, the organisation moved to work on empowerment and primary education as well.

== Current activities ==
=== Development of Natural Resources ===
Seva Mandir develops water harvesting systems to increase the availability of water for agriculture and clean drinking water for communities. Furthermore, the organisation works on regenerating common land. The majority of the rural and tribal communities depend on the common land for their survival. More than 120 million trees have been planted in an effort to combat climate change.

=== Women's Empowerment ===
Seva Mandir run Self-Help Groups, Women's Resource Centres and a shelter home for women who have faced physical and/or mental abuse.

=== Primary Education ===
Seva Mandir runs over 140 Shiksha Kendra (bridge schools) in remote rural areas. Shiksha Kendras use an activity-based learning method to teach previously out-of-school children aged between 6–14 years old. A Residential Learning Camp is also run for the same age range.

=== Youth ===
Youth Resource Centres are run to connect often left-behind adolescent boys and girls with vocational, life and social skills trainings. A football initiative is used to link the young people in rural and tribal communities with the resource centres.

=== Peri-urban ===
Seva Mandir works in 2 peri-urban areas; Delwara and Kelwara, the latter or which is near Kumbhalgarh fort. The organisation works on issues of governance, water availability, waste management, and heritage restoration. A community and heritage walk is also run in Delwara for tourists.

=== Community Institutions ===
Seva Mandir creates and facilitates Community Institutions in rural and tribal communities. It is mandated that these institutions are democratically elected and have an equal representation of men, women, and children. Their aim is to take responsibility for their own development and sustain projects after Seva Mandir steps back.

== Notable associations ==
Seva Mandir's research association with Nobel Prize winners Abhijit Banerjee, Esther Duflo and Michael Kremer began in 1996 and set out to improve the health and educational status of remote rural and tribal communities of Udaipur and Rajsamand districts. The research studies contributed to the global discourse on the alleviation of poverty. Banerjee and Duflo discussed the results of their research with Seva Mandir and other organisations globally in their book Poor Economics: A Radical Rethinking of the Way to Fight Global Poverty.
