= Customary kingdoms of Wallis and Futuna =

Special subdivision of the French overseas collectivity of Wallis and Futuna

Map of the Kingdom of Uvea.

Two Futuna kingdoms: Sigave and Alo.

The customary kingdoms of Wallis and Futuna are a special subdivision of the French overseas collectivity of Wallis and Futuna. Officially recognized in 1961 by the French state in the statute of Wallis and Futuna, they are governed by the customary kings. This is the only subdivision of France that is still a kingdom. There are three kingdoms: Uvea, on the island of Wallis, and the kingdoms of Sigave and Alo on the islands of Futuna and Alofi. These kingdoms differ in history, politics (with one king per kingdom), language (Wallisian, Futunan), and flag. The kingdoms are called pule'aga sau in Futunian, meaning “king's domain”.

== History ==
Wallis and Futuna were first settled between 1300 and 800 B.C. The chiefdoms gradually developed independently on each island, influenced in Wallis by the Tongan invasions of the 15th century. The Christianization of these two islands in the 1840s led to the structuring of the various chiefdoms by missionaries, freezing the borders of the Alo and Sigave kingdoms before Wallis and Futuna were brought together as a protectorate in 1888. In 1961, Wallis and Futuna became a French overseas territory, creating an institutional balance in which the customary kings played an important role alongside the French administration.

=== Creation of chiefdoms and kingdoms ===
==== Tongan conquest of Wallis (15th century) and first kings ====
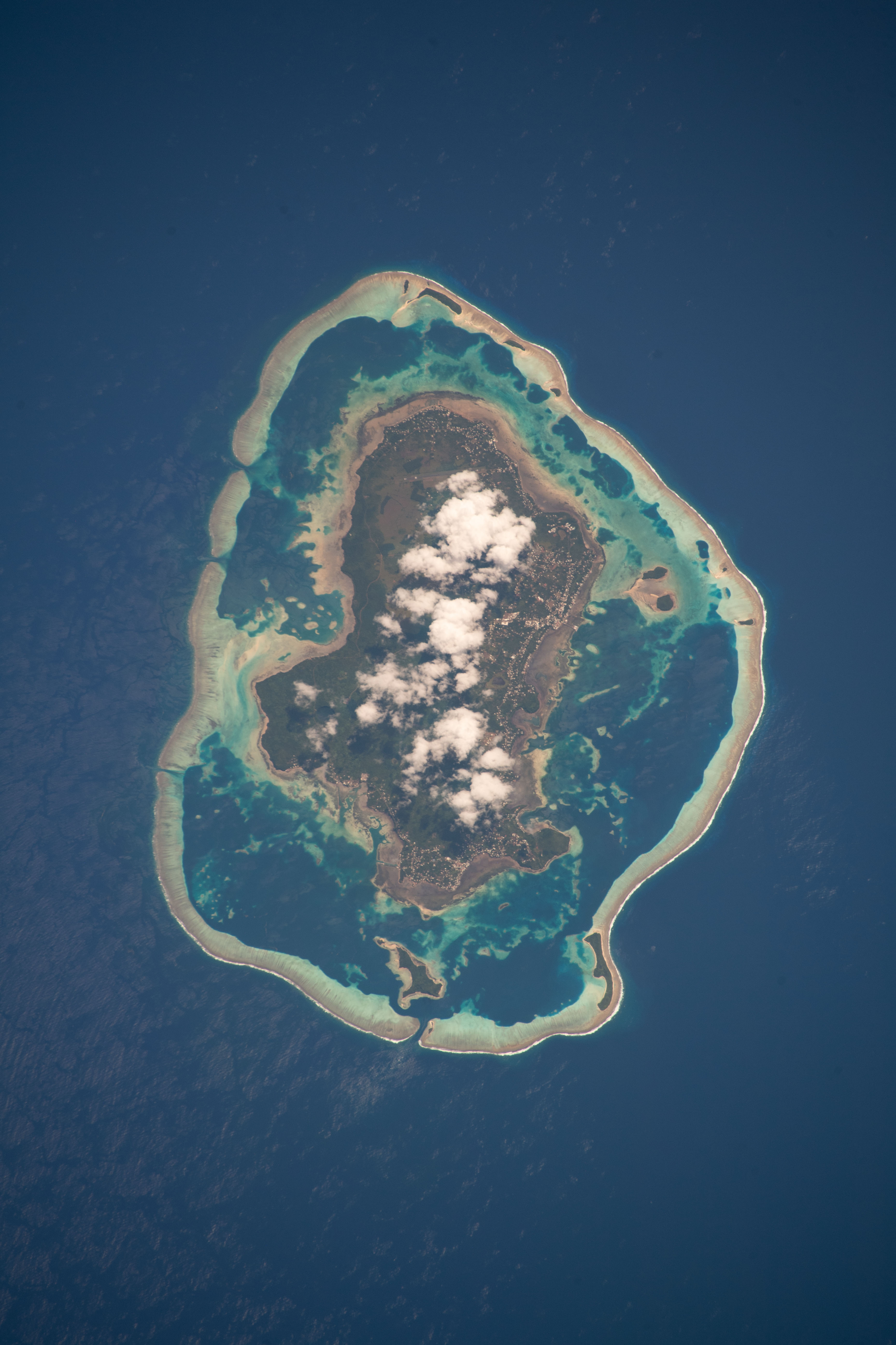
Satellite image of Wallis.

By the early 15th century, small human communities were already present on Wallis. These scattered groups were mostly found on the island's west coast, facing the lagoon's passes. Later, these communities spread throughout Wallis. Tongans sent by their king, the Tu'i Tonga Kau'ulufonua fekai, arrived around the 15th century, and the natives scattered across the island could not resist the invasion. Tu'i Tonga Ga'asialili, the former king in charge of the conquest, subdued the Uvea kingdom and divided its territory between three chiefs: Hoko, Kalafilia, and Fakate, which later became the island's first districts. To consolidate their already extensive domination of the island, the Tongans occupied and built numerous forts, including Kolonui, one of the most important. This period is known as the “period of forts”. It ended around 1500 when the Tongans lost interest in Wallis. They then delegated the running of the island to the Wallisians, who set up a dynastic political system based on the Tongan model. However, the Tongans kept a close eye on Wallis' leadership through their influence. A pyramid-type chieftaincy was set up, headed by a Hau (“king”) surrounded by advisors. Genealogies of the successive kings of Wallis (Lavelua) began in the dynastic period, around 1500.

During their domination of Wallis, the Tongans gradually imposed their social structure. The Wallisian language underwent a major transformation, incorporating many elements of Tongan. Tongan influence thus had a lasting impact on local history. Around a century after the Tongan conquest, Uvea gradually regained its autonomy from Tonga, until one of the Tu'i Tonga declared the island's independence.

==== Futuna's political evolution into two kingdoms ====
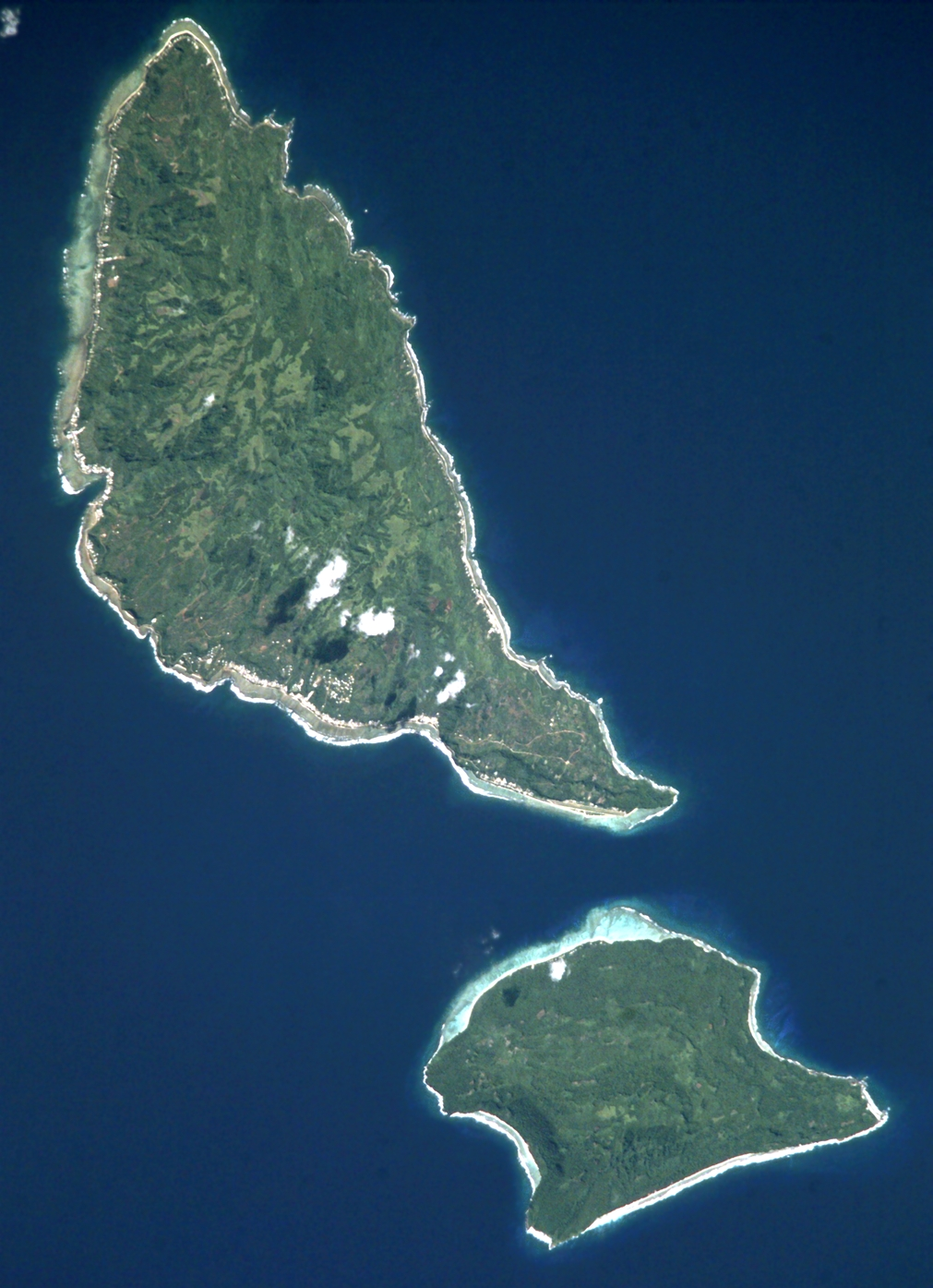
Satellite image of Futuna to the north and Alofi to the south.

Futuna did not suffer the same fate as Wallis and resisted the Tongan invasions. It has managed to maintain its original culture, making this island one of the closest culturally and linguistically to ancestral Polynesia. Oral tradition tells of rich ties with the Samoans, whose arrival was peaceful. The rulers of the Alo kingdom are said to have originated from Samoa (Fakavelikele lineage). Similarities in construction have also been observed between the two islands. However, historian Christophe Sand points out that Futuna is quite different from Samoa, having retained its own cultural and political autonomy. From the year 700, faced with Tongan expansionism in the region, the inhabitants were forced to retreat inland, building numerous forts (kolo). At the time, Futuna was divided into several rival groups, who regularly clashed and forged alliances in times of common danger. The Futunians succeeded in repelling the Tongan invasions, although the latter left their mark on local culture, notably with the probable adoption of the kava as a symbol of chieftaincy power.

The last period of Futunian history, from 1700 onwards, is known as the “brown earth” (Kele Kula), about the brown earth of the taro plantations. At that time, there were still no kingdoms, but various chiefdoms gathered in the mountains. Inhabitants left the mountains to settle by the sea. During this phase, Futuna's various independent and rival political entities gradually unified. This implied the gathering of populations around chiefs called kolo in Futunian.

When the French Marist missionaries landed on Futuna on November 7, 1837, only two rival political entities remained: the kingdom of Sigave and that of Tu'a, soon renamed the kingdom of Alo. These two kingdoms regularly clashed. The Vai War, Futuna's last, took place on August 10, 1839. The Alo kingdom emerged victorious and Sigave was defeated. After this episode, Niuliki became king of all Futuna until he died in 1842. On Niuliki's death, the single kingdom split into two, Alo and Sigave, and a king was crowned in each kingdom.

=== Nineteenth-century ===
==== Christianization ====
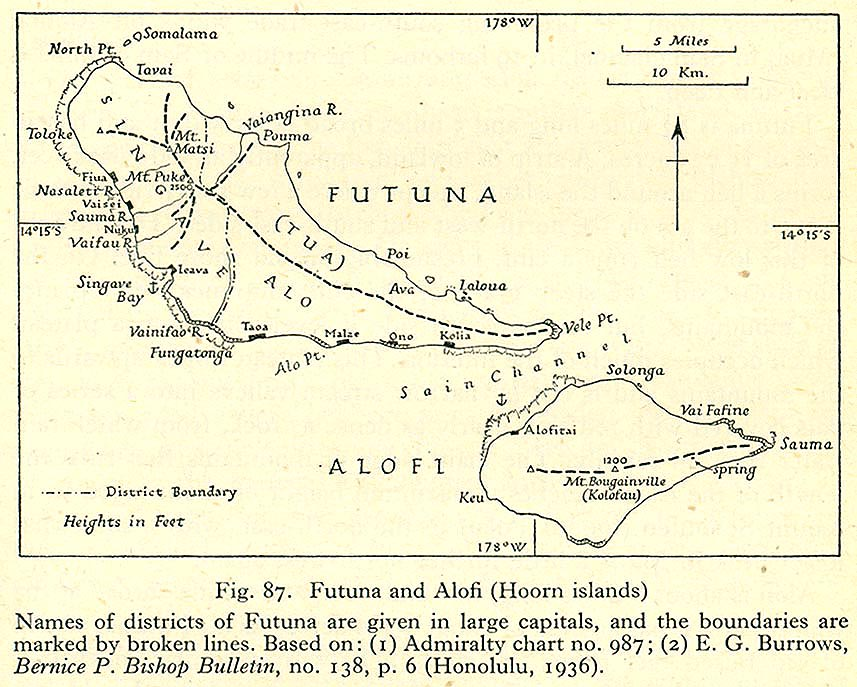
Old map of the Hoorn Islands archipelago with Futuna and Alofi, including the kingdoms of Sigave and Alo.

In the late 1830s, Marist missionaries (notably Pierre Bataillon and Pierre Chanel) converted the inhabitants of both islands to Catholicism. In Wallis, Soane-Patita Vaimua Lavelua I was the first sovereign to be baptized, and those of Futuna soon followed. The missionaries soon played an important role with the various chieftainships and became an essential power on both islands. They were largely responsible for drafting and translating the laws issued by the customary kings.

It was from the Code of Wallis (known in Wallisian as Tohi fono), promulgated in 1871 by Queen Amelia Tokagahahau, that the royalty was structured by the missionaries. The code affirms the supreme power of the Lavelua (King of Wallis). It also sets down in writing the composition of the chiefdom: six ministers, as well as three district chiefs and 21 village chiefs, all appointed by the king. It also made the Catholic religion the official religion. However, the code was quickly forgotten: the configuration of Wallisian royalty was perceived by the population as ancestral, even though it had previously evolved with the wars between the various clans and royal families.

== Geographical presentation ==
=== Uvea ===
The kingdom of Uvea (Wallisian name) encompasses the entire island of Wallis (96 km²). The title held by the sovereign of this kingdom is Lavelua. This kingdom has been ruled by the customary king Patalione Kanimoa since April 14, 2016. The royal palace of Uvea is located in the capital, Mata Utu, which is the most populous city in Wallis and Futuna, with 1,029 inhabitants. The prime minister is called the Kalae Kivalu; this post has been held by Mikaele Halagahu since 2017. The kingdom has 21 villages and 3 districts, Hihifo, Hahake and Mu'a. In 2018, the kingdom of Uvea had a total population of 8,833, making it the most populous kingdom in Wallis and Futuna.

Districts of Wallis

Hihifo district.

Hahake district.

Mu'a district.

=== Alo ===
The Kingdom of Alo encompasses the south-east of Futuna and the island of Alofi. It lies 230 km from the island of Wallis and covers an area of 53 km2. It has been ruled by customary king Lino Leleivai since November 30, 2018. The royal palace of Alo is located in the capital, Ono. The title worn by the ruler of this kingdom is Tu'i Agaifo. The prime minister, in office since 2019, is Petelo Ekeni Vaitanaki. The kingdom comprises 9 villages. In 2018, the kingdom of Alo had a total population of around 1,950. The villages of Alofitai and Tuatafa have one and two inhabitants respectively, and are the least populated villages in Wallis and Futuna.

=== Sigave ===
The Kingdom of Sigave occupies the northwest of Futuna Island. It covers an area of 21 km². The kingdom comprises 6 villages. It has been ruled by customary king Eufenio Takala since March 1, 2016. The Sigave royal palace is located in the capital, Leava. The title worn by the ruler of this kingdom is Tu'i Sigave. In office since 2019, the prime minister is Emiliano Keletaona. In 2018, the Kingdom of Sigave had a total population of 1,275, making it the smallest kingdom in terms of demography.

== Flags ==
In the 1980s, the Futunian kingdoms of Alo and Sigave created their flags. The flag of Wallis and Futuna was then reserved for the kingdom of Uvea (Wallis). All three flags fly the French tricolor in canton. Even today, they are used in all three kingdoms, notably for customary celebrations.

Uvéa

Alo

Sigave

== Bibliography ==
- Chave-Dartoen, Sophie (2017). Royauté, chefferie et monde socio-cosmique à Wallis ('Uvea): Dynamiques sociales et pérennité des institutions [Royalty, chieftaincy and the socio-cosmic world of Wallis ('Uvea): Social dynamics and institutional durability] (in French). Marseille: Pacific-credo Publications. ISBN 978-2-9537485-6-7.
- Frimigacci, D.; Siorat, J. P.; Vienne, B. (1988). Généalogies du royaume d'Alo et de Sigave [Genealogies of the kingdom of Alo and Sigave] (PDF) (in French).
