= List of airports in Wallis and Futuna =

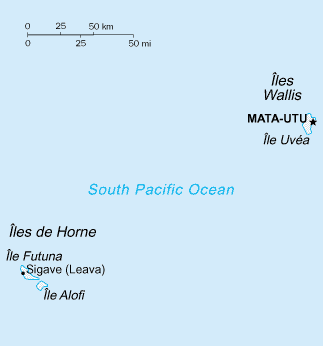
Map of Wallis and Futuna

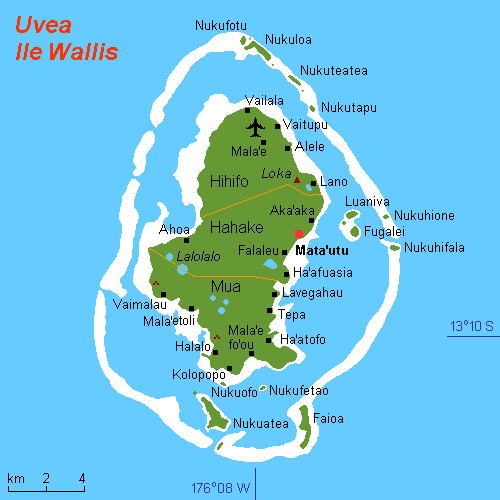
Map of Wallis Island

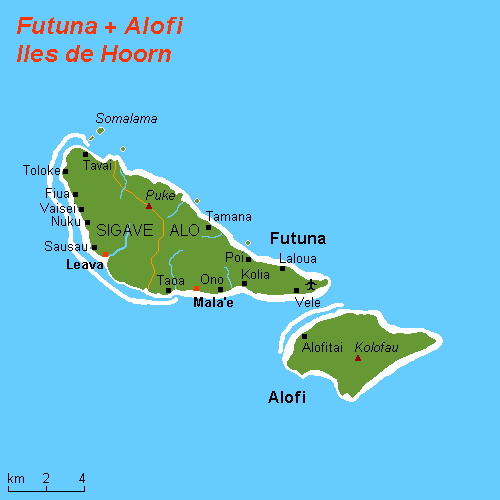
Map of Hoorn Islands (Futuna and Alofi)

This is a list of airports in Wallis and Futuna.

Wallis and Futuna (French: Wallis et Futuna) is an overseas collectivity (collectivité d'outre-mer or COM) of France located in the South Pacific between Fiji and Samoa.

The territory is made up of three main volcanic tropical islands along with a number of tiny islets, and is split into two island groups that lie about 260 kilometres (160 mi) apart, namely Wallis Islands (or Uvea Islands) in the northeast and Hoorn Islands (or Futuna Islands) in the southwest, including Futuna Island proper and the mostly uninhabited Alofi Island. The capital of Wallis and Futuna is Mata-Utu, which is located on Wallis Island.

== Airports ==
ICAO location identifiers are linked to each airport's Aeronautical Information Publication (AIP), which are available online in Portable Document Format (PDF) from the French Service d'information aéronautique (SIA). Locations shown in bold are as per the airport's AIP page. Most airports give two locations: the first is the city served, second is the city where the airport is located.

Location served	ICAO	IATA	Airport name	Usage
**Wallis** / Mala'e	NLWW	WLS	Hihifo Airport	Public
**Futuna** / Vele	NLWF	FUT	Pointe Vele Airport (Maopoop Airport)	Restricted

== See also ==
- List of airports in France
- List of airports by ICAO code: N#NL - Wallis and Futuna
