= Aircalin =

Flag carrier of New Caledonia

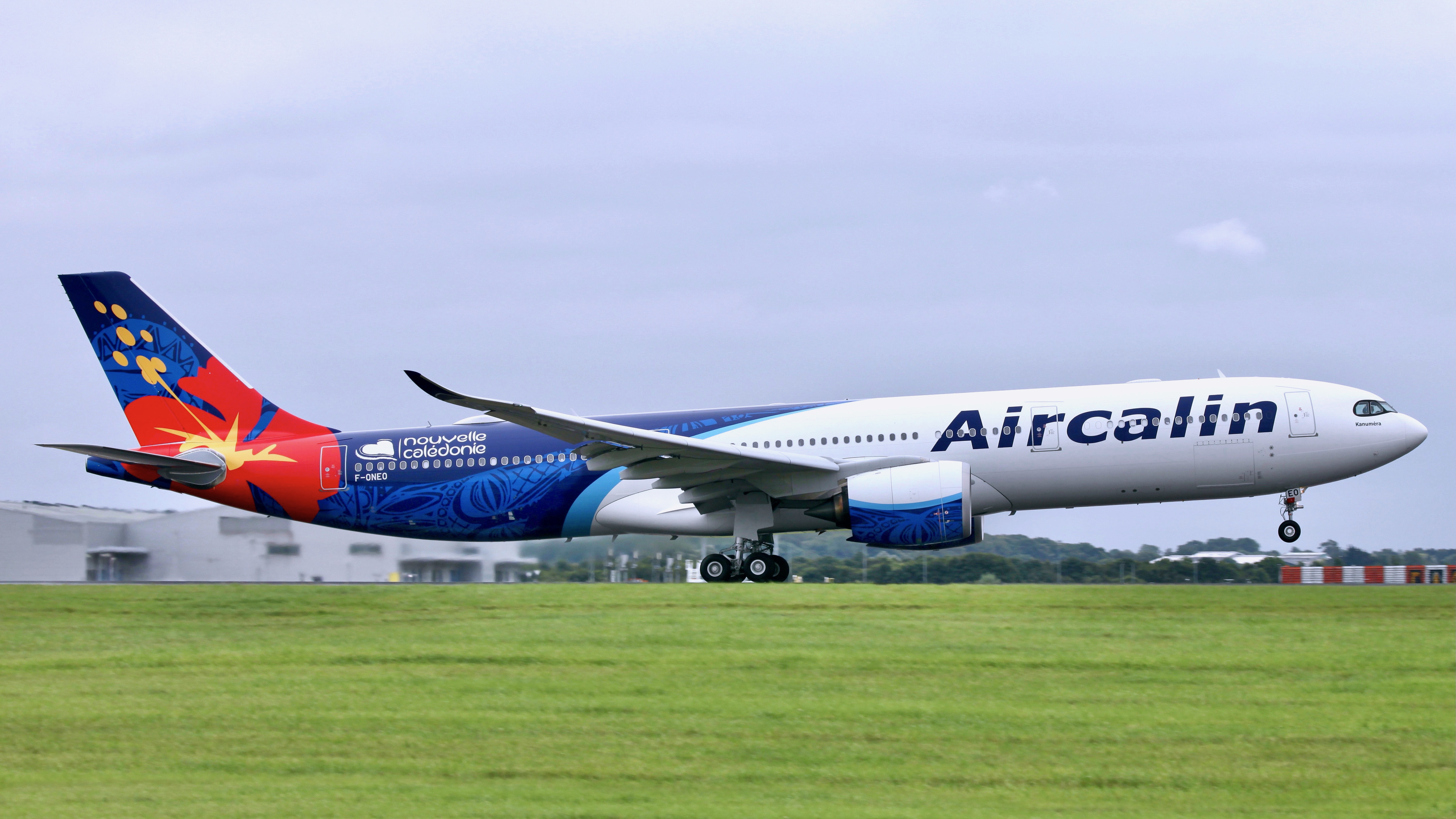
- Airbus A330-900
| IATA | ICAO | Call sign |
|---|---|---|
| SB | ACI | AIRCALIN |
- Founded: September 1983; 43 years ago (as Air Calédonie International)
- Hubs: La Tontouta International Airport
- Frequent-flyer program: Flying Blue
- Fleet size: 4
- Destinations: 11
- Parent company: Government of New Caledonia
- Headquarters: Nouméa, New Caledonia
- Key people: Marcel Unë (President); Georges Selefen (MD)
- Revenue: ▲€151 million (2017)
- Employees: 480 (2020)
- Website: www.aircalin.com

Société Aircalin, also known as Air Calédonie International, is the flag carrier of the French collectivity of New Caledonia, with its headquarters in Nouméa. It operates scheduled services from its main hub at La Tontouta International Airport to destinations across Oceania and Asia, as well as domestic services in Wallis and Futuna. The airline is 99% owned by the Government of New Caledonia, with the remaining 1% held by minority owners, including the airline's employees.

== History ==
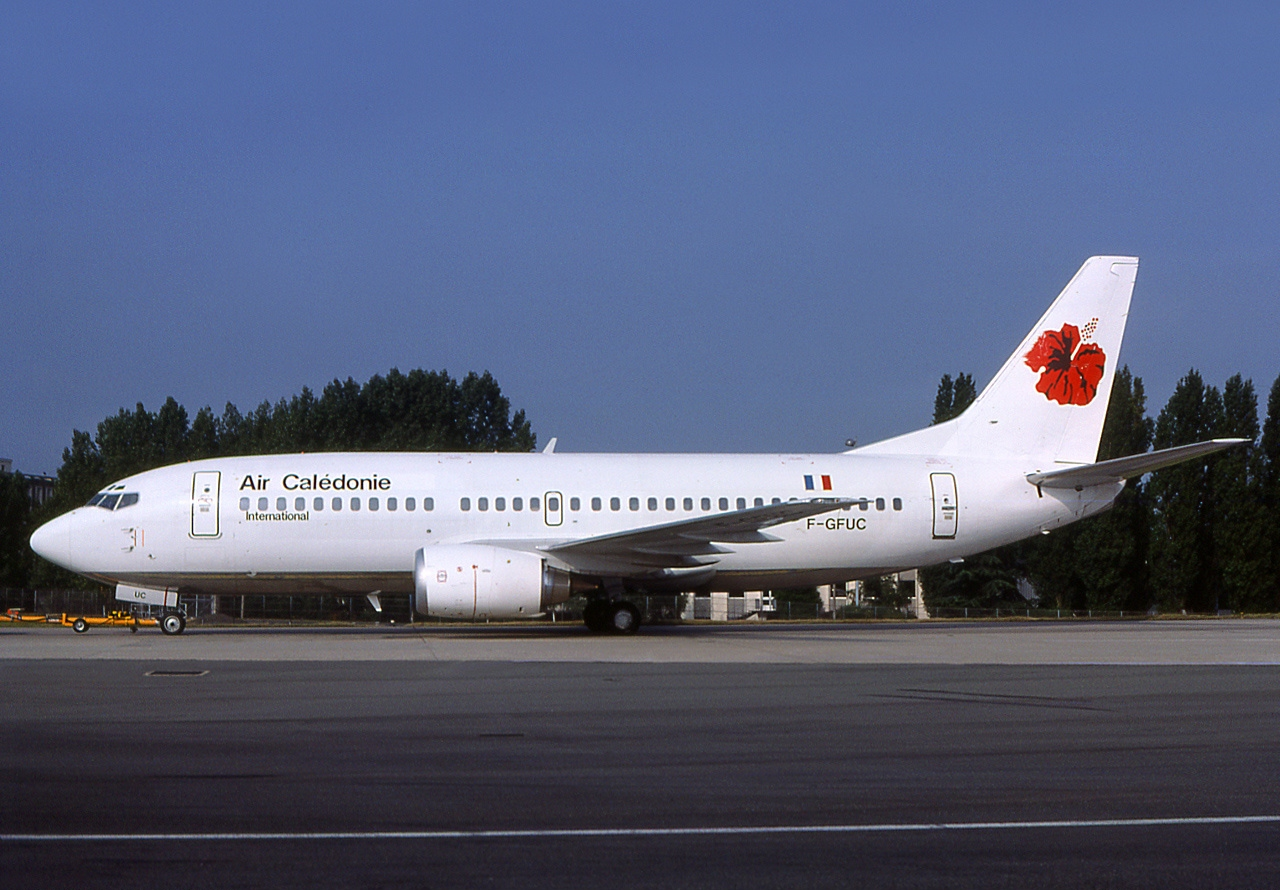
Air Calédonie International's first Boeing 737-300, as seen in 1989

The airline was established in September 1983 as Air Calédonie International, an international airline to complement New Caledonia's domestic airline, Air Calédonie. Between 1983 and 1985, the airline operated flights from Nouméa by leasing aircraft from other airlines including Air Nauru and Qantas. In 1985, the airline acquired a Sud Aviation Caravelle from Corsair, which it used to open routes to Sydney and Auckland until 1988, when the airline replaced the Caravelle with a Boeing 737-300. In 1986, the airline began operating in Asia until 1997 due to the Asian Financial Crisis, specifically operated from Nouméa to Kagoshima via Manila and Hong Kong, shortly after, it began flying to Honolulu from Nouméa via Guam and Wake Island until 1999 due to unprofitability. In 1987, the airline also acquired a De Havilland Canada DHC-6 Twin Otter to operate services in Wallis and Futuna. In 1996, the airline rebranded as Aircalin, unveiling a new corporate image and logo.

In April 2000, Aircalin agreed on a three-year interim lease with Airbus for an Airbus A310-300 previously operated by Swissair as its first widebody aircraft. This allowed the airline to trial the viability of long-haul services, with the airline's first long-haul destination being Osaka. The next year, the airline ordered two Airbus A330-200s from Airbus, which were to begin delivery upon the expiration of its Airbus A310 lease. The airline also considered the replacement of its single Boeing 737-300 with an Airbus A320-200. Aircalin's first Airbus A330-200 proceeded to begin service in late 2002, replacing the leased Airbus A310, while the second A330-200 allowed the airline to open a new route to Tokyo, taking over Air France's service between Tokyo and Nouméa. On 9 February 2004, the airline received its first Airbus A320-200, which replaced its Boeing 737-300.

On 1 July 2014, Aircalin unveiled a new livery with the delivery of its second Airbus A320-200, the livery incorporating shades of blue inspired by New Caledonia's lagoon and skies, as well as traditional symbols. In October 2017, the airline ordered two Airbus A320neo and two A330-900 aircraft, with the intent of replacing its two Airbus A320-200 and two A330-200 aircraft. Aircalin's first Airbus A330-900 was delivered on 30 July 2019, and the airline subsequently planned the retirement of its Airbus A330-200 operations for September 2019. Following the initial retirement of the airline's Airbus A330-200 aircraft, Aircalin returned one of its Airbus A330-900 aircraft to Airbus in November 2019, citing noxious fumes in the cabin during operation, similar to issues reported by TAP Air Portugal for their own A330-900 aircraft. One of the airline's A330-200 aircraft was temporarily returned to operation for six weeks, during which the A330-900 was being investigated by Airbus and engine manufacturer Rolls-Royce until December 2019.

During the COVID-19 pandemic, Aircalin in May 2020 reported a 93% drop in passenger demand since March 2020, postponed all operations outside of French repatriation flights, and announced plans to cut staffing costs by 20% through a combination of layoffs and voluntary resignations. The airline also announced the suspension of its routes to Melbourne and Osaka from Nouméa, and the postponement of its Airbus A320neo deliveries from 2020 to 2023. The airline initially in July 2020 scheduled the resumption of services to Osaka for March 2021, but flights to Osaka never resumed. Despite previous reports that its Airbus A320neo deliveries would be postponed to 2023, Aircalin accepted its first of two A320neos in December 2020, before retiring its remaining Airbus A320-200s by April 2021.

== Destinations ==
Aircalin serves or has previously served the following destinations as of December 2023:

| Country or territory | City | Airport | Notes | Refs |
|---|---|---|---|---|
| Australia | Brisbane | Brisbane Airport | | |
| Australia | Melbourne | Melbourne Airport | Terminated | |
| Australia | Sydney | Sydney Airport | | |
| China | Hangzhou | Hangzhou Xiaoshan International Airport | Terminated | |
| Fiji | Nadi | Nadi International Airport | | |
| France | Paris | Charles de Gaulle Airport | | |
| French Polynesia | Papeete | Faa'a International Airport | | |
| Guam | Hagåtña | Antonio B. Won Pat International Airport | Terminated | |
| Hong Kong | Hong Kong | Kai Tak Airport | Airport closed | |
| Japan | Kagoshima | Kagoshima Airport | Terminated | |
| Japan | Osaka | Kansai International Airport | Terminated | |
| Japan | Tokyo | Narita International Airport | Terminated | |
| New Caledonia | Nouméa | La Tontouta International Airport | Hub | |
| New Zealand | Auckland | Auckland Airport | | |
| Philippines | Manila | Ninoy Aquino International Airport | Terminated | |
| Singapore | Singapore | Changi Airport | | |
| South Korea | Seoul | Incheon International Airport | Terminated | |
| Thailand | Bangkok | Suvarnabhumi Airport | | |
| United States | Honolulu | Daniel K. Inouye International Airport | Terminated | |
| Vanuatu | Port Vila | Bauerfield International Airport | | |
| Wallis and Futuna | Wallis | Hihifo Airport | | |
| Wallis and Futuna | Vele | Pointe Vele Airport | Terminated | |
| Wake Island | Wake Island | Wake Island Airfield | Terminated | |

=== Interline agreements ===
Aircalin has interline agreements with the following airlines:

- Singapore Airlines
- Virgin Australia

=== Codeshare agreements ===
Aircalin has codeshare agreements with the following airlines:

- Air Caledonie
- Air France
- Air New Zealand
- Air Tahiti Nui
- Air Vanuatu
- Japan Airlines
- Qantas
- Singapore Airlines

== Fleet ==
=== Current fleet ===
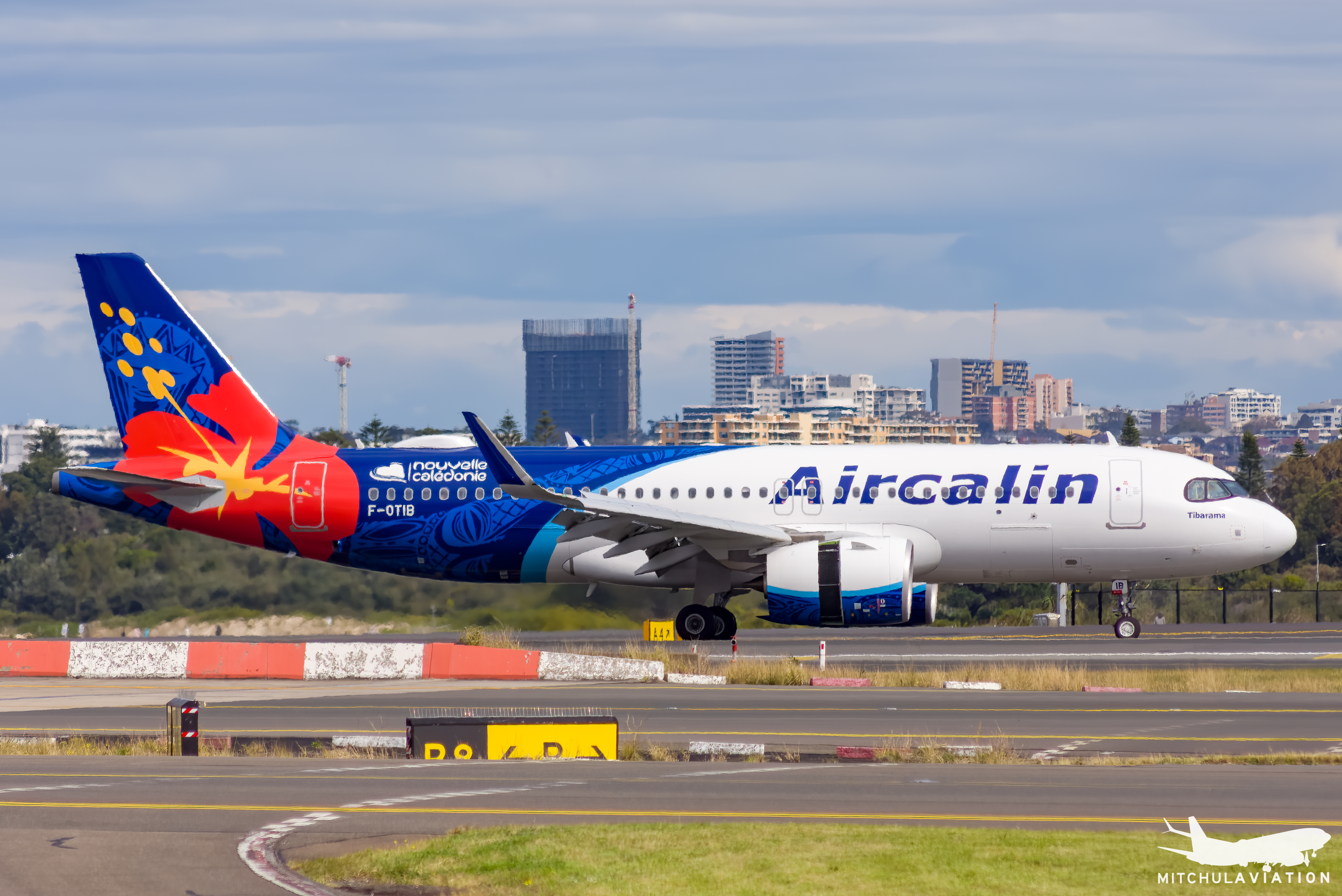
Aircalin Airbus A320neo

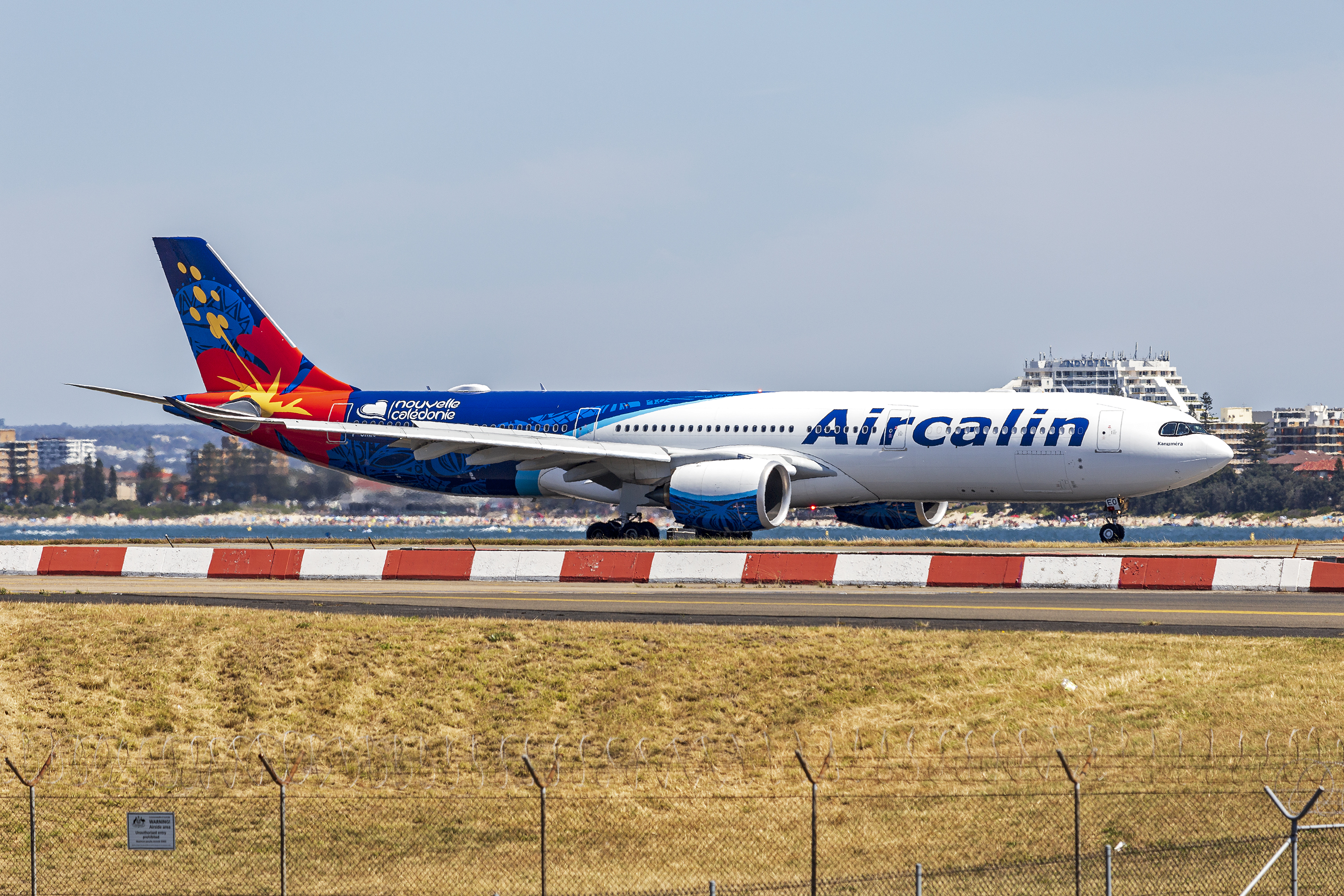
Aircalin Airbus A330-900

As of August 2025, Aircalin operates an all-Airbus fleet consisting of the following aircraft:

Aircalin fleet
| Aircraft | In service | Orders | Passengers | | | | Notes |
| Aircraft | In service | Orders | J | W | Y | Total | Notes |
|---|---|---|---|---|---|---|---|
| Airbus A320neo | 2 | — | — | 8 | 160 | 168 | |
| Airbus A330-900 | 2 | — | 26 | 21 | 244 | 291 | |
| Airbus A350-900 | — | 2 | TBA | | | | |
| Total | 4 | 2 | | | | | |

== Frequent-flyer program ==
Aircalin participates in Flying Blue, the frequent-flyer program of Air France–KLM. The airline originally joined as a partner of Air France's Fréquence Plus program in 1997, before it was later succeeded by and integrated into KLM's Flying Blue program in 2003.
