= Petelo =

Petelo may refer to:

- Zolani Petelo (born 1975), South African boxer
- Petelo Kahofuna, Wallis and Futuna royalty
- Petelo Vikena (c. 1943), Wallis and Futuna royalty
