= Kolia, Wallis and Futuna =

Kolia
- Village
- Location in Futuna Island
- Coordinates: 14°18′33″S 178°5′55″W
- Country: France
- Territory: Wallis and Futuna
- Island: Futuna
- Chiefdom and District: Alo

Population (2018)
  - Total: 254
- Time zone: UTC+12

Kolia is a village in Wallis and Futuna. It is located in Alo District on the southern coast of Futuna Island. Its population according to the 2018 census was 254 people.
