= Petelo Vikena =

- Tuigaifo (King) of Alo (Futuna)
- Reign: November 6, 2008 – January 22, 2010
- Coronation: November 6, 2008
- Predecessor: Soane Patita Maituku (deposed Feb. 2008); Position Vacant from Feb. 2008 - 17 Jan. 2014^{6}
- Successor: Petelo Sea
- Born: c. 1943 (age 82–83)

Petelo Vikena (born c. 1943) was Tuigaifo, or Monarch, of the Kingdom of Alo, which is also known as the Kingdom of Futuna from his coronation on November 6, 2008 to his abdication on January 22, 2010. Alo is one of the three traditional kingdoms, or chiefdoms, which comprise Wallis and Futuna.

== Personal life ==
Vikena is the father of eleven children. He spent much of his professional career outside of Wallis and Futuna in Metropolitan France. Vikena served in the French Army and worked as a public servant while in France. He later moved to New Caledonia, where he served as a Nouméa Town Council officer. There are an estimated 20,000 Wallisians and Futunans living in New Caledonia.

== Coronation ==
Vikena was crowned the new Tuigaifo of Alo, also known as the Kingdom of Futuna, in an official coronation on November 6, 2008. The coronation, which took place in the small village of Alo, included a mix of traditional and religious elements. The coronation began with a religious ceremony followed by traditional Polynesian rituals and customs indigenous to Alo (Futuna), including a kava ceremony and offerings from Vikena's family and allied chiefly clans. Roast pig offerings, dancers with spears, and tapas ornamentations similar in design to those traditional used on Samoa were also featured at the coronation. Vikena was 65 years old at the time of his coronation.

Guests included representatives of several of Alo's chiefly clans, as well as French officials.

Vikena's coronation was not without controversy. Some chiefly clans disapproved of Vikena. They argued that the decision to crown Vikena as the new Tuigaifo was the result of a unilateral decision from the chiefly council and not a result of a consensus among chiefly and royal clans and families.

The position of Tuigaifo had been vacant since February 19, 2008, when Vikena's predecessor, Soane Patita Maituku, was deposed as the result of a unanimous decision taken by the kingdom's four chiefly clans. The position remained vacant from February until Vikena's coronation in November 2008.

== Abdication ==
Vikena's reign lasted only fourteen months and was strongly contested. “[S]everal chiefly clans” disputed his legitimacy, arguing that “his coronation did not result from a consensus among chiefly and royal clans and families, but from a unilateral decision from the chiefly council”. This resulted in “social tensions”, expressed notably through acts of vandalism against royal property. In this context, Vikena chose to abdicate on January 22, 2010. He was succeeded by Petelo Sea.

== Background ==
The two islands of Wallis and Futuna are home to three traditional kingdoms, which are also known as chiefdoms. One kingdom encompasses all of Wallis Island while Futuna Island has two distinct chiefdoms . Futuna is divided into two separate kingdoms: The Kingdom of Sigave, ruled by the Tuisigave, and the Kingdom of Alo, which is headed by the Tuigaifo.

Petelo Vikena Tuigaifo of Alo (Futuna)
Regnal titles
Preceded by Soane Patita Maituku (deposed Feb. 2008); Vacant from February 2008 to November 2008	Tuigaifo of Alo (Futuna); November 6, 2008 – January 22, 2010	Succeeded by Petelo Sea (Succeeded January 17, 2014)
