= Petelo Sea =

- Tuiagaifo (King) of Alo (Futuna)
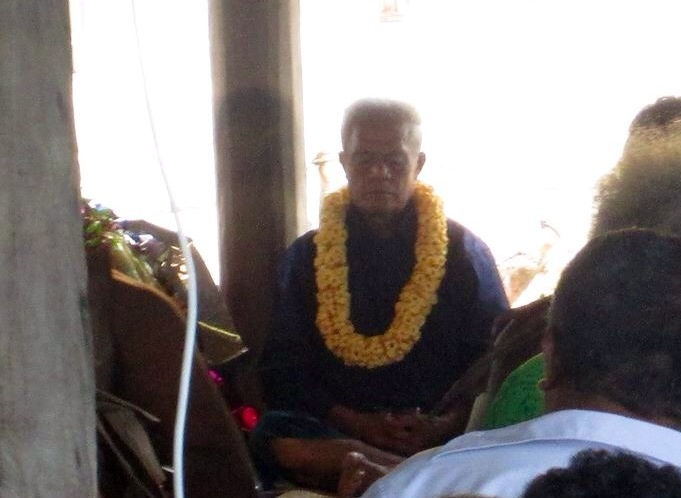
- Reign: January 17, 2014 – May 16, 2016
- Coronation: January 17, 2014
- Predecessor: Petelo Vikena (Position Vacant from January 22, 2010 - 17 Jan. 2014)
- Born: c. 1944 (age 81–82)

Petelo Sea was, from 2014 to 2016, tuiagaifo (king) of the Kingdom of Alo, one of the three traditional kingdoms located in the French Overseas Collectivity of Wallis and Futuna.

== Selection and enthronement ==
On 14 January 2014, Petelo Sea was agreed upon as the candidate of the Talise clan and the Matakaviki family to the Council of Chiefs of Alo, for the kingship, following four years of negotiations between prominent local families to fill the vacancy created by the abdication of Petelo Vikena. At the meeting in the village of Ono, where kava roots, an important customary symbol, were present, Petelo Vea's candidacy was announced by Atelea Nau, of the Talise clan, in a meeting lasting only a few minutes. Grand Chef Coutumier of Alo (Saagogo) Ipasio Masei confirmed it to Réseau Outre-Mer 1re on 16 January. His enthronement was scheduled for 17 January at the Ono fale, at a ceremony organized by the Talise clan and attended by the entire population of Alo, along with Pierre Simunek, Secretary General of the Prefecture of Wallis and Futuna, Assemblée Nationale representative Napole Polutele, Senators of Wallis and Futuna, and the President of the Territorial Assembly, invited by the Grand Chef Coutumier.

Petelo Sea was officially listed on the “Registre de l'État” and took up his duties among the Council of Chiefs, where he met them for the first time, and Marguy Bergua, Adjointe du Délégué, on 20 January 2014. He carries the title “His Majesty Tuiagaifo Petelo Sea.”

== Personal life ==
Petelo Vea was born in 1944 and is from the Talise royal clan and the Matakaviki family. He is married to Telesia Sea, has three sons, three daughters, and eleven grandchildren. Relatives at Petelo Sea's enthronement were from Futuna, Wallis, and New Caledonia. Petelo is described by his wife as “an attentive husband, who does everything in the house, occupied with his children and grandparents. When they finish school, he will urge them to continue their studies...”
