= List of kings of Alo =

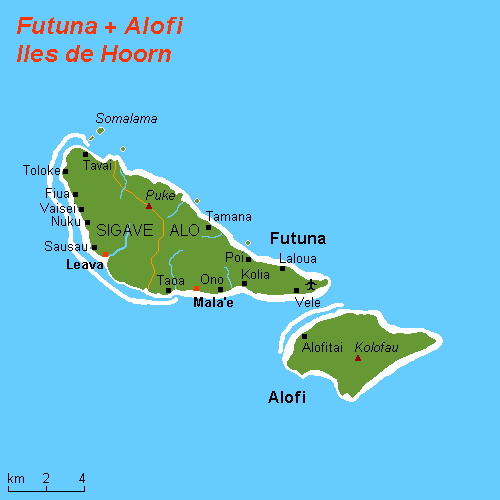
Map of the Hoorn Islands, also called Futuna Islands.

Flag of Alo.

The King of Alo (titled as Tu`i Agaifo) is the ruler of the polity of Alo, one of the two chiefdoms (Royaume coutumier, lit. 'customary kingdom') located on Futuna. Alo encompasses the eastern part of the island.

Futuna is one of the Hoorn Islands in the French overseas collectivity of Wallis and Futuna (Note: Officially the Territory of the Wallis and Futuna Islands.), in Oceania in the South Pacific Ocean.

== List of rulers of Alo ==
=== Fakavelikele ===
- Fakavelikele
- Pili
- Mala'evaoa
- Nimo o le Tano'a
- Veliteki (1748–1756)
- ... (1756–1784)
- Fonati (1784–1839?)

=== Tu`i Agaifo ===
- Fonoti (1837?–1839?)
- Niuliki (1839?–1841)
- Musumusu (1841–1844) (Regent)
- Filipo Meitala (1844–1862)
- Alia Segi (1862–18..)
- Soane Malia Musulamu (1887?–1929)
- Soane Moefana (1929–1932)
- Tuiseka
- Usanio Pipisega
- Paloto Aika
- Savelio Meitala
- Kamilo Katea
- Maleselino Maituku
- Kolio Maituku
- Papilio Talae
- Lelipo Pipisega
- Alesio Feta'u
- Petelo Savo Meitala
- Soane Va Pipisega
- Silisio Katea
- Petelo Talae
- Vito Tuiseka
- Petelo Maituku (19.. – 27 December 1958) (1st time)
- Setefano Tuikalepa (29 December 1958 – 8 February 1960)
- Kamaliele Moefana (9 February 1960 – 9 December 1961)
- Pio Tagatamanogi (28 December 1961 – 8 September 1962)
- Mikaele Fanene (15 September 1962 – 19..)
- Seteone Pipisega (19.. – 30 May 1970)
- Petelo Maituku (1 June 1970 – 1 May 1973) (2nd time)
- Mikaele Katea (10 May 1973 – 17 April 1974)
- Patita Savea (20 April 1974 – 28 December 1976)
- Kalepo Nau (11 January 1977 – 17 July 1978)
- Nopeleto Tuikalepa (15 March 1979 – 29 October 1984)
- Petelo Lemo (20 November 1984 – 24 February 1990)
- Lomano Musulamu (24 February 1990 – 1 February 1995)
- Esipio Takasi (6 April 1995 – 9 July 1997)
- Sagato Alofi (10 July 1997 – October 2002)
- Soane Patita Maituku (21 November 2002 – 19 February 2008)
- Petelo Vikena (6 November 2008 – 22 January 2010)
- Vacant (22 January 2010 – 17 January 2014)
- Petelo Sea (17 January 2014 – 14 May 2016)
- Vacant (14 May 2016 – 7 June 2016)
- Filipo Katoa (17 June 2016 – 3 October 2018)
- Lino Leleivai (29 November 2018 – 1 October 2022)
- Vacant 1 October 2022 (abdication of Leleivai)

== See also ==
- List of kings of Sigave
- List of kings of Uvea
