= Soane Patita Maituku =

King Soane Patita Maituku (1947?-) was the Tu'i Agaifo of the Kingdom of Alo from November 2002 until February 19, 2008, when he was deposed as the result of a unanimous decision taken by the kingdom's four chiefly clans.

His predecessor was Sagato Alofi. Maituku was succeeded by Petelo Vikena, who was crowned Tuigaifo on November 6, 2008. The position had remained vacant during the intervening months.

Soane Patita Maituku Tuigaifo of Alo (Futuna)
Regnal titles
Preceded by Sagato Alofi	Tuigaifo of Alo (Futuna); November 21, 2002 – February 19, 2008	Succeeded by Petelo Vikena
