= Tamana, Wallis and Futuna =

Tamana
- Village
- Location in Futuna Island
- Coordinates: 14°17′3.48″S 178°6′15.84″W
- Country: France
- Territory: Wallis and Futuna
- Island: Futuna
- Chiefdom and District: Alo

Population (2018)
  - Total: 152
- Time zone: UTC+12

Tamana is a village in Wallis and Futuna. It is located in Alo District on the southern coast of Futuna Island. Its population according to the 2018 census was 152 people.
