= Dance of Wallis and Futuna =

Type of dance

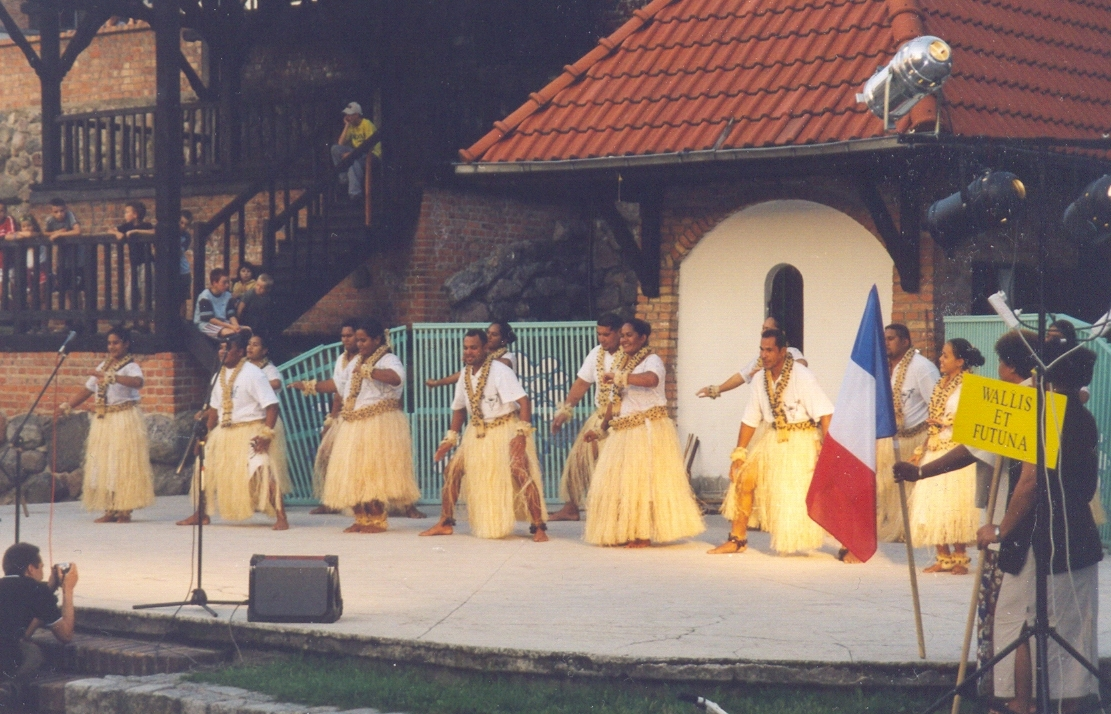
11th International Folklore Festival "Kashubian Culture Days". Chojnice, Poland; Wallis Mako ensemble from Wallis and Futuna

In Uvea (Wallis) and Futuna, dances play a major cultural role. One sees dance in fakahaha'aga (festivals), to'oto'oga (ceremonies or celebrations), or just for pure pleasure. In Uvea, the term faiva is used for dance, whereas the term mako is used. In Uvea and Futuna there is a katoaga which is only celebrated with the visit of chiefs and if lucky, with the Lavelua (King). As the years go by, dance and culture is still alive and well in Uvea and Futuna. The normal fakapale is given to the dancers for their magnificent dance. The following dances of Uvea and Futuna below are just some of the dances, or are the main dances seen in Wallisian and Futunan culture.

== Eke ==
The Eke is a stick dance performed by both genders. The Eke started travelling during the Tongan overlordship of Uvea and Futuna in the 14th century. In Tonga they have a same but different stick dance called Soke. The dancers are armed with sticks about four feet [1.2m] long formed two lines facing each other. During the dance the pair of male and females struck the sticks together in a manner similar to quarterstaff sparring.

== Kailao ==
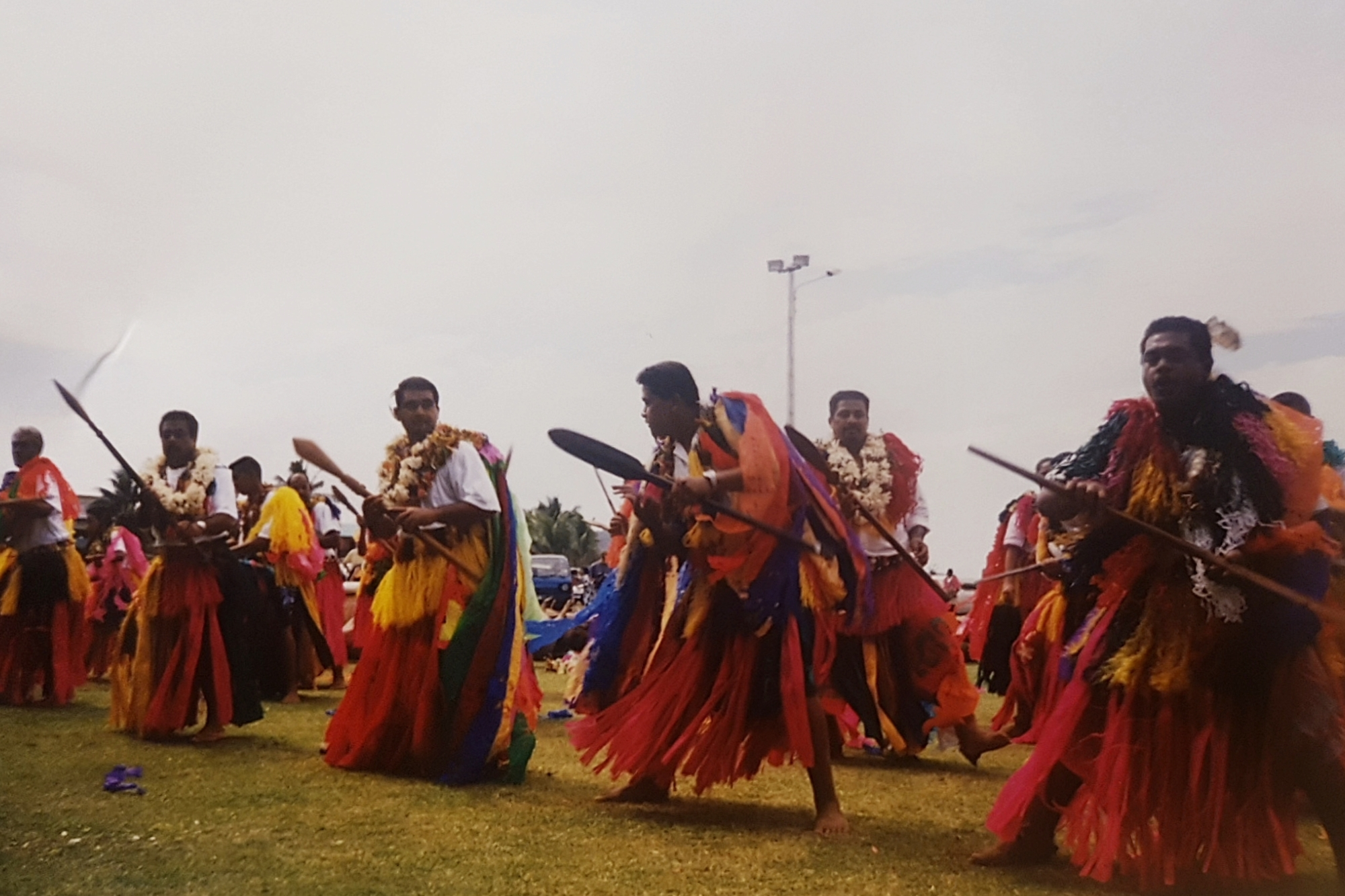
Kailao dance in Mata Utu in 2001.

This is the most popular of the implement dances seen in Uvea and Futuna. It's a club dance performed without a song 'to the rhythm of a wooden pate (gong) or an empty kerosene tin. Two parties of male dancers approached each other from opposite sides of the mala'e (village green), usually in columns of twos. During the dance they went through 'a drill of vigorous twirling, swinging, and slapping motions' with the clubs.

== Tāpaki/Tu'upaki ==
The Tā-paki (Futuna) or Tapaki (Uvea) is an implement dance using broad, flat paddles (paki) which are twirled, tossed and slapped by the dancers. In Futuna, Tāpaki is performed only by men, whereas in Uvea it can involve females to perform with the males. The Tāpaki/ Tu'upaki is performed in honour of the chief (aliki) of a village, his ancestors and their deeds The dance is originally from Futuna but has spread to Uvea and also to Tonga where they have a similar paddle dance called Me'etu'upaki.

== Niutao ==
Wallisian girls perform a dance called faka Niutao somewhere in the South of Wallis Island, 1943. Extract of a movie from the US Navy.

The Niutao or Fakaniutao (Futuna) is a dance that was named after one of the islands of Tuvalu. This dance can be performed either by men alone, women alone or the two together. It follows the elements of the Tuvaluan Fātele, but slightly more gracefully rather than extreme gestures. The accompanying song is Europeanised, and the tempo is usually accelerated from beginning to end. Uvea Museum Association holds the first 16mm colour film of dance on Wallis in its collections, which was recorded in 1943.

== Sasa ==
The Sasa is a sitting dance borrowed from the neighbouring islands of Samoa. The dance consists of fast and slow actions to the accompanying chorus. There is no singing in this dance but the instruments are played, which makes the Wallis/Futuna version different from that of the Samoan version which consists of no instruments but the log drum (papa). The pulotu or dance leader normally leads the dance and makes sure that each dancer is following in time. The Sasa is performed at festivals and occasions.

== Lakalaka ==
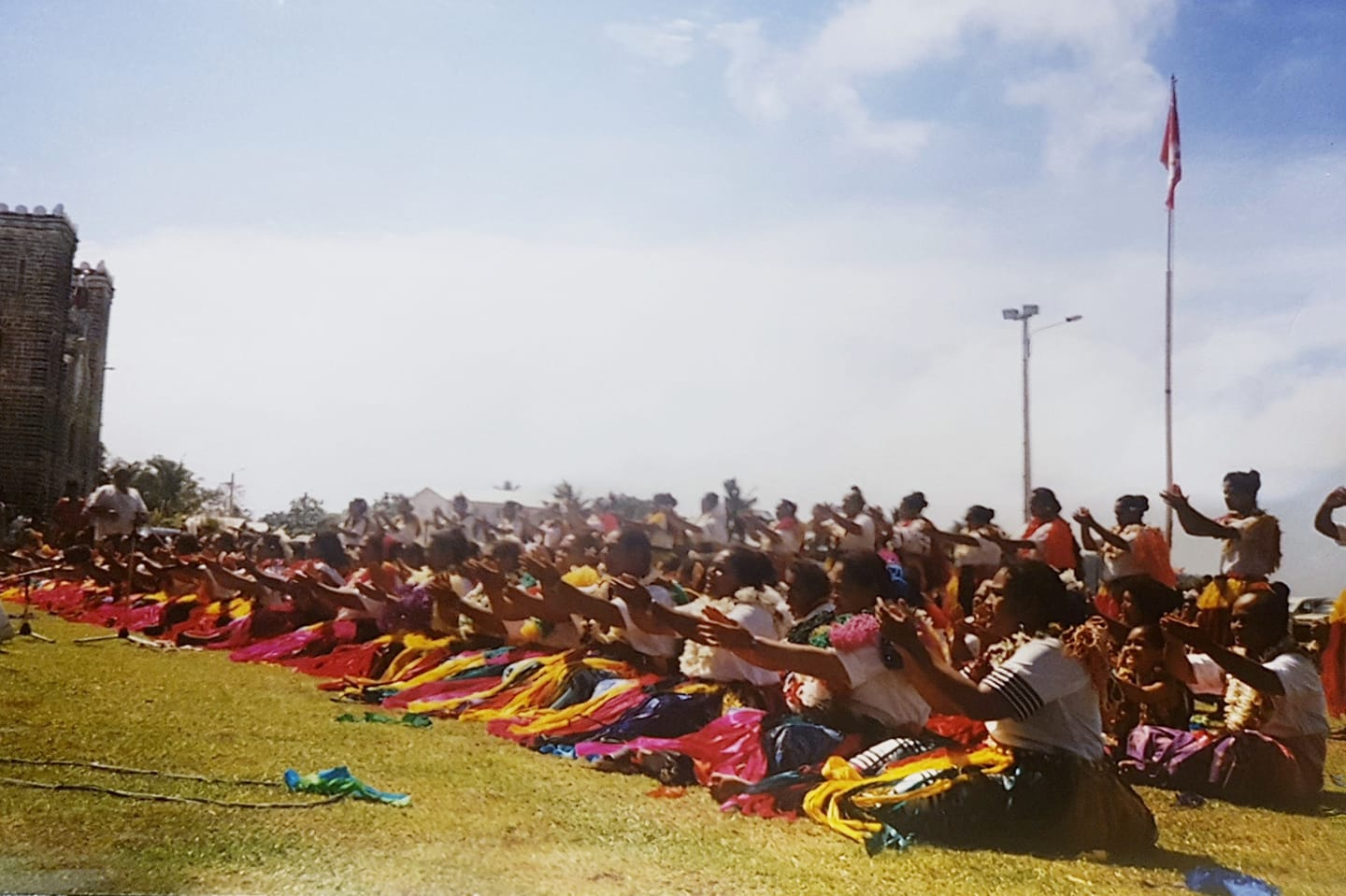
Lakalaka in Mata Utu in 2001.

This is performed after the Sasa, and is the singing segment in which the songs are included with the sitting dance. Each verse is very significant and is composed carefully by the ma'u fatu hiva (song composer/poet). Normally in a Lakalaka the first stanza is supposed to greet the King and its chiefs. The lakalaka in particular is normally Wallis and Futuna's main dance seen in the islands; performing for the favour of their King, or after a Kava ceremony.

== Soamako ==
The Soamako has been described as an informal type of dance accompanied by continuously accelerating music, the final speed of which was 'limited only by the energy of the singers and dancers'. Generally the dancers themselves did not sing but were accompanied by a lologo (chorus) grouped with wooden drums, guitars, ukuleles and nafa (which is made out of an empty bin with the top made of black rubber). The song usually consisted of couplets, repeated until the dancers grew weary. As well, there is an informal type of Soamako of today, described as a 'combat dance' between two groups of dancers who enter from opposite sides alternately and try to better the performance of their opponents.

== See also ==
- Katoaga
