= Chanel College =

Chanel College may refer to several schools named for Peter Chanel:

- Chanel College (Gladstone), in Gladstone, Queensland, Australia
- Chanel College (Dublin), in Coolock, Dublin, Ireland
- Chanel College (Geelong), in Geelong, Victoria, Australia
- Chanel College, Masterton, in Masterton, New Zealand
- Chanel College, Moamoa, in Moamoa, Samoa

== See also ==
- St Peter Chanel School (disambiguation)
