= Tuatafa =

- Village
- Location in Futuna Island
- Coordinates: 14°15′20″S 178°8′34″W
- Country: France
- Territory: Wallis and Futuna
- Island: Futuna
- Chiefdom and District: Alo

Population (2018)
  - Total: 2
- Time zone: UTC+12

Tuatafa is a village in Wallis and Futuna. It is located in Alo District on the northwestern coast of Futuna Island. According to the 2018 census, the villiage's population was two people. It contains a church named Eglise de Sainte Famille.
