= Alofitai =

- Village
- Location in Alofi Island
- Coordinates: 14°19′43″S 178°3′40″W
- Country: France
- Territory: Wallis and Futuna
- Island: Alofi
- Chiefdom and District: Alo

Population (2018)
  - Total: 1
- Time zone: UTC+12

Alofitai, often simply named Alofi, is a village in Wallis and Futuna. It is located on the northwestern coast of Alofi Island. It belongs to the chiefdom of Alo.

== Overview ==
In 2003, a total of two people were recorded as permanent residents of the village of Alofitai; as of the 2008 census, only one person was listed as a permanent resident. Although Alofi Island is virtually uninhabited, the village is a base for tobacco production, and has a small chapel that is used by the Futunans who visit the island on Sundays.
