= St Peter Chanel School =

St Peter Chanel School may refer to the following schools named for Peter Chanel:

Australia

- St Peter Chanel Primary School, Brisbane, in The Gap, Brisbane, Queensland
- St Peter Chanel Primary School, Melbourne, in Deer Park, Melbourne, Victoria

New Zealand

- St Peter Chanel School, Hamilton
- St Peter Chanel School, Motueka
- St Peter Chanel School, Ōtaki

The Philippines

- St Peter Chanel School of Cavite, in Cavite

The United States

- St. Peter Chanel High School, Bedford, Ohio

== See also ==
- Chanel College (disambiguation)
