= Soke (dance) =

Tongan group dance

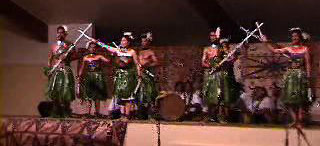
The performers are ready to start

Sōkē or eke is a Tongan group dance performed with sticks which the performers hit against each other on the beat of the drum. It has some common elements with, but is a complete independent development from the English Morris dance. As with most Tongan dances, the whole performance is to dazzle the spectators and to please the chiefs. There is no hidden purpose.

== History ==
The exact origins of the eke are disputed. Historian Edwin Burrows describes it as having a "martial character", while anthropologist Harley Harris Bartlett suggests that it may be originally agricultural. The tabloid The Catholic Weekly has claimed that it originated as penance for the 1841 killing of Catholic priest Peter Chanel.

With the introduction of Catholicism in Tonga, they brought the eke with them, first to Tafahi, then to Niuafoʻou. After the volcanic eruption of their island in 1946 the people of Niuafoʻou were resettled on ʻEua. From there the eke, by then named sōkē came to Tongatapu, to the Catholic diocese of Maʻufanga to be more exact, which brought it into Tonga's mainstream.

== Performance ==
A single vaka (boat) consists of 2 men and 2 women facing each other. Each of the men have one long stick, about 2 meter, the women carry short sticks, about 40 cm, one in each hand. Occasionally this assignment is exchanged. On the beat of the music they hit the sticks against each other in a repeating pattern.

In the first movement, for example, the woman to the left (or right) hits with her right stick the top of the stick of the man to the right (or left), then her left stick against his on the bottom, and then her right on his top again, while on the fourth beat they turn around to prepare for the next movement. But many variants are possible. The last hit can be done with her left stick again, while he quickly turns over his whole stick. Or the second hit can be in the middle on the long stick, which the man keeps up as a shield

In the second movement the exchange is diagonally: the men hit the tops of their sticks together, then the bottoms, then the tops again, while the women in the space left over hit their sticks together. Or perhaps the men hit only twice, giving the women more space to elegantly hit their sticks in the middle on the second beat. Again beat 4 is the transition to the next movement.

The third movement may be as the first one, but now the exchange is between the persons in the front and in the back.

In the fourth movement, if used, the women can turn to the public to make a little bow, or to hit their own sticks together, while the men can bump their sticks with a bang on the ground.

These movements repeat as long as the song continues. Various series of movements may be applied to different stanzas, but they fall in either of two groups:

- Eke nou (short eke), where the groups of 4, the separate 'boats' interact with themselves only. In a big performance there are many 'boats' on a row, all performing independently.
- Eke loa (long eke), when the 'boats' exchange performers, the front row for example going to the left and the back row to the right.

== Lyrics ==
There are a few songs which will be recited at a sōkē, usually when the performers are still standing still. When the refrain is sung they hit their sticks as long as the refrain is repeated, and when finished they stand still again for the rest of the song. There are a few refrains like 'hina hea' and 'sōkē'. In fact the original name of the dance is rather eke and not sōkē. But nowadays in Tonga it is better known by this refrain. However, on Wallis and Futuna it is still known by its original name.

Part from the ʻUvean (Wallis island) eke, which was already known before 1932 and was performed by the ʻUvean community in Suva at the South pacific festival of 1972:

Pongipongi tuʻu te nuanua i sakē
moʻo teketi mai te fanālua i sakē
e ōmai ai naʻi mātuʻa i sakē
o fehuki pē ko fea ia Lavelua i sakē
pea tala age leva naua i sakē
e ʻafio i Hahake Lavelua i sakē

which translates as: In the morning there is a rainbow hurray - and a twomaster appears hurray - bringing these both gentlemen hurray - who ask where Lavelua is hurray - whereupon they two are told hurray - king Lavelua reigns in Hahake [the eastern district of ʻUvea, where the capital Mata Utu is located] hurray. The two gentlemen named seem to be Pierre Chanel and Marie Nizier, who were sent to Futuna by father Pierre Bataillon (see below).

Part from the Maʻufanga (Tonga) sōkē:

Sōkē! he siale toli nofo
au ta tuia sōkē
lupe fau fālelé
matangi angi pea moé
ʻatu ē! langa mai fohé
isakē, isakē, isakē, isakē io!

Siale-toli-nofo means gardenia-picked-while-sitting-down most likely a contribution from Tafahi, where on the road to the top of the mountain Piu-ʻo-Tafahi there grows a gardenia with its branches so low over the path that you can pick the flowers with no effort. The place is called Pua-toli-nofo (flower picked sitting down).

Most of the words of the song are quite unintelligeable in modern Tongan, but some words (seafaring terms, like matangi angi pea moe, the wind blows and then sleeps) and names (like Lavelua and Futuna) can be distinguished which give a clue to its origin. Also the ʻUvean and Futunan versions are in such old language that it is not clear which language it is. The two pieces above, however, are rather ʻUvean.

== Gallery ==
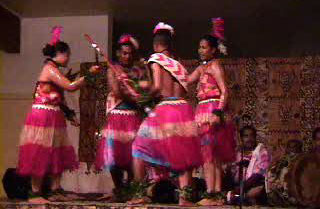
Exchange left and right

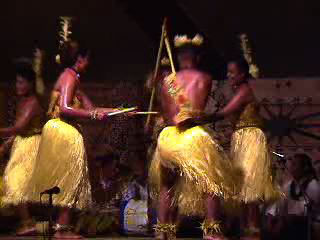
Exchange diagonally

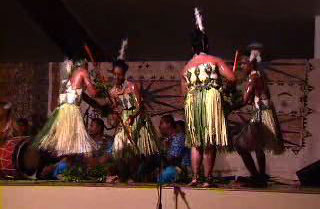
Exchange front and back

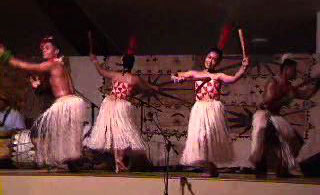
Intermezzo to the public

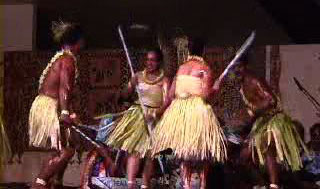
Men and women sticks exchanged
