= Hihifo Airport =

Airport in Mala'e, Wallis and Futuna

Hihifo Airport Aéroport de Hihifo
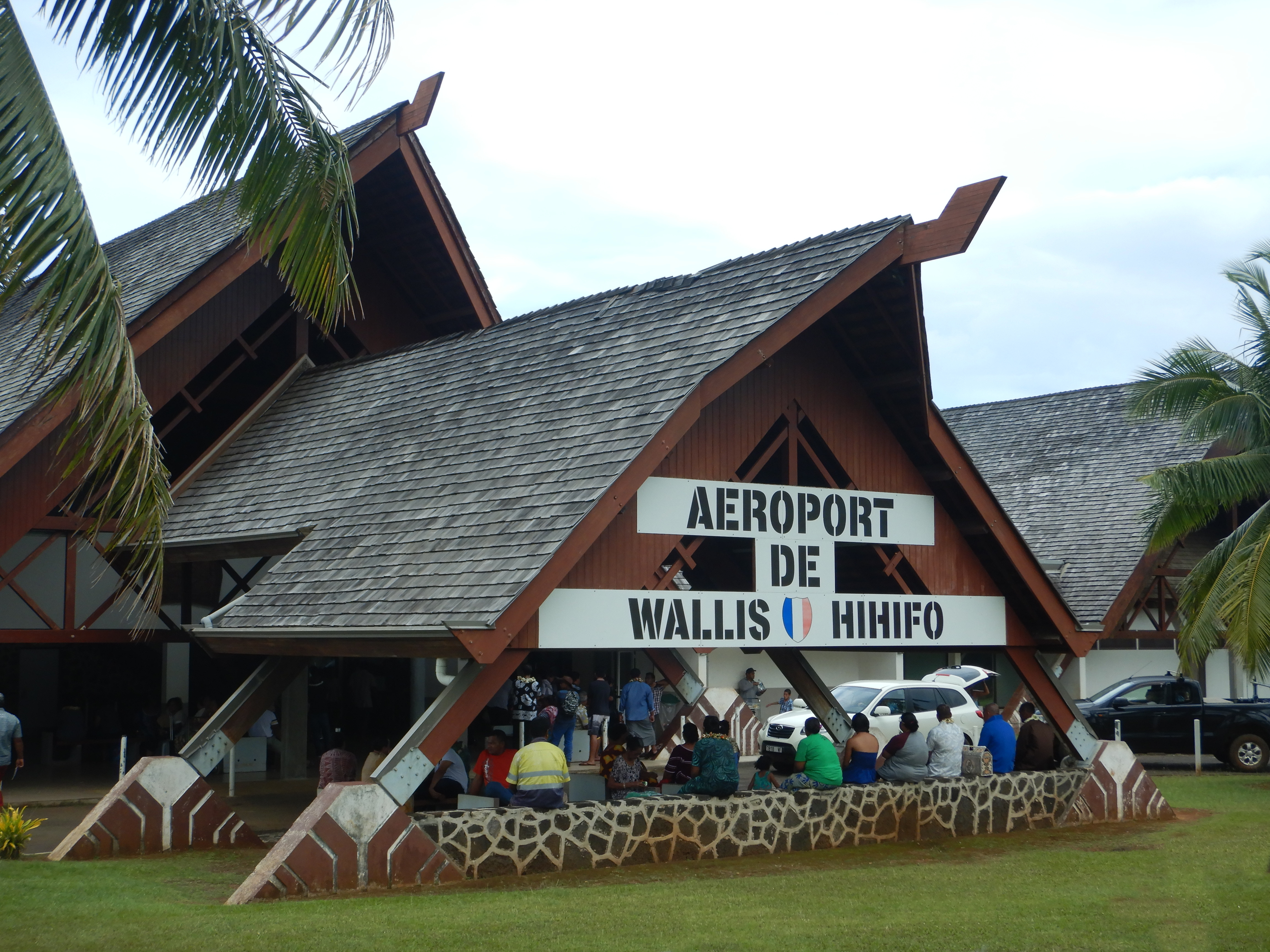
- IATA: WLS; ICAO: NLWW

Summary
- Airport type: Public
- Serves: Mala'e (Wallis Island, Wallis and Futuna)
- Location: North of Mala'e
- Elevation AMSL: 79 ft (24 m)
- Coordinates: 13°14′17.81″S 176°11′57.22″W

Map
- Location of airport in Wallis

Runways
Direction	Length		Surface
Direction	ft	m	Surface
08/26	6,890	2,100	Asphalt
- Source: World Aero Data

Hihifo Airport (IATA: WLS, ICAO: NLWW) is an airport in Hihifo serving Wallis Island in Wallis and Futuna. The airport is 5.6 km from Mata-Utu, the capital city. It was constructed by Seabees in March 1942 as a bomber field. It was upgraded in 1964.

In 2015, the airport was blockaded by locals as part of a land dispute.

== Statistics ==
Graph showing the change in the number of passengers by year:

== Airlines and destinations ==
Aircalin connects Hihifo Airport to Nadi International Airport, in Fiji, and La Tontouta International Airport (Nouméa), in New Caledonia.

== See also ==
- Hihifo District
- Pointe Vele Airport
- List of airports in Wallis and Futuna
