= Peter Chanel =

19th-century French Catholic priest, missionary, and martyr

Saint Peter Chanel S.M.
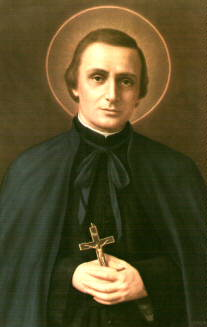

Protomartyr of Oceania
- Born: 12 July 1803; Montrevel-en-Bresse, Ain, France
- Died: 28 April 1841 (aged 37); Futuna Island
- Venerated in: The Catholic Church; Church of England
- Beatified: 17 November 1889, Rome by Pope Leo XIII
- Canonized: 12 June 1954, Rome by Pope Pius XII
- Major shrine: Futuna
- Feast: 28 April
- Patronage: Oceania

Peter Louis Marie Chanel, SM (12 July 1803 – 28 April 1841) (Arpitan: Pierro Chânél), was a Catholic priest, missionary, and martyr. Chanel was a member of the Society of Mary and was sent as a missionary to Oceania. He arrived on the island of Futuna in November 1837. Chanel was clubbed to death in April 1841 at the instigation of a chief upset because his son had converted.

== Life ==
=== Early years ===
Chanel was born in the hamlet of La Potière near Montrevel-en-Bresse, Ain département, France. Son of Claude-François Chanel and Marie-Anne Sibellas he was the fifth of eight children. From about the age of 7 to 12 he worked as a shepherd. The local parish priest persuaded his parents to allow Peter to attend a small school the priest had started. After some local schooling, his piety and intelligence attracted the attention of a visiting priest from Cras, the abbé Trompier, who took over the boy's education at Cras in the autumn of 1814. He made his first communion on 23 March 1817.

It was from that time that Chanel's attraction for the missions abroad began. His interest began when he read letters from missionaries to America sent back by Bishop Louis William Valentine Dubourg. He later said, "It was that year that I formed the idea of going to the foreign missions." In 1819 he entered the minor seminary at Meximieux where he won several awards and class prizes in Latin, Christian doctrine, and oratory. He attended the Belley diocesan college in 1823, and the major seminary at Brou in 1824.

Chanel was ordained on 15 July 1827 and spent a brief time as an assistant priest at Ambérieu-en-Bugey. At Ambérieu he also read letters from a former curate from that parish who was at that time a missionary in India. There he met Claude Bret, who was to become his friend and also one of the first Marist Missionaries. The following year, Chanel applied to the Bishop of Belley for permission to go to the missions. His application was not accepted and instead, he was appointed for the next three years as parish priest of Crozet. Chanel found his new parish in a deplorable state. On Sundays and feast days, the church was almost empty; the children idle, and left to themselves. The priest went on a pilgrimage to Annecy, to the tomb of Francis de Sales who had once visited his parish.

Chanel's zeal was respected, and his care, particularly of the sick in the parish, won the hearts of the locals. During this time, Chanel heard of a group of diocesan priests who were hopeful of starting a religious order to be dedicated to Mary, the Mother of Jesus.

=== Marist and missionary ===
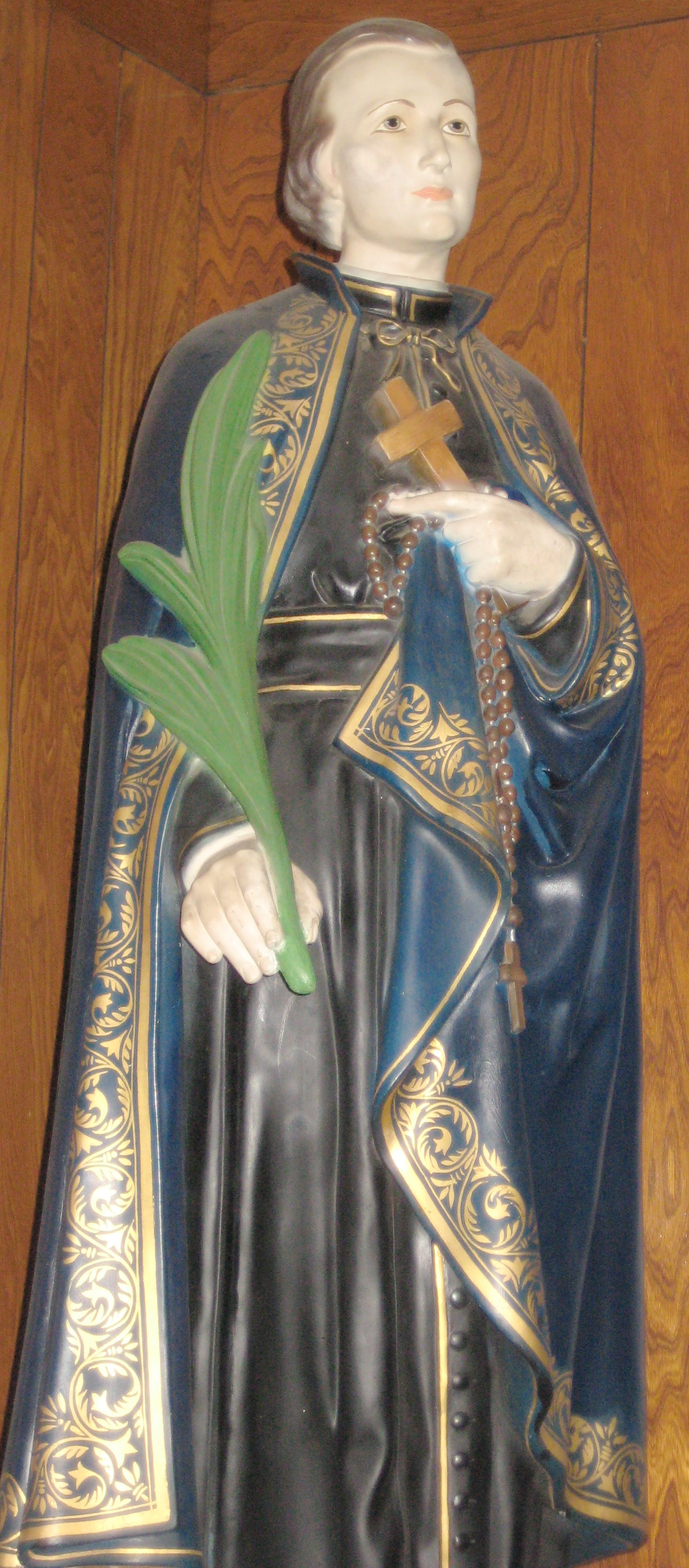
Statue of St Peter Chanel at the Lourdes Center, Boston, Massachusetts

In 1831, at the age of 28, Chanel joined the nascent Society of Mary (Marists), who would concentrate on local missions and foreign missionary work. Instead of selecting him as a missionary, however, the Marists appointed him as the spiritual director at the seminary of Belley, where he stayed for five years. In 1833, he accompanied Jean-Claude Colin to Rome to seek approval of the nascent Society. In 1836, the Marists were asked to send missionaries to the territory of the southwest Pacific. In return for eventual acceptance, the group were promised formal approbation, granted by Pope Gregory XVI. Chanel, professed with the other aspirants as Marist on 24 September 1836, was made the superior of the band of seven Marist missionaries that set out on 24 December from Le Havre on the Delphine accompanied by the new Bishop of Maronea (Western Oceania), Jean-Baptiste Pompallier. Chanel was not deterred by the dangers of such a long sea voyage.

Chanel traveled first to the Canary Islands (8 January 1837), where his friend, Claude Bret, caught a flu-like virus which led to his death at sea (20 March 1837). Next, Chanel traveled to Valparaíso, Chile (28 June), where the French Congregation of the Sacred Hearts of Jesus and Mary ("Picpus Fathers"), who had care of the Apostolic Vicariate of Eastern Oceania, had their base. His third and fourth stops were in the Gambier Islands (13 September) and in Tahiti (21 September), where the group transferred to the ship Raiatea. In that ship, they set sail (23 October) to drop off two missionaries at Wallis, the main seat of the mission in Tonga. The missionaries arrived at Vava'u but were not welcome, and thus continued their journey to Futuna. Chanel went to neighboring Futuna, accompanied by a French lay brother, Marie-Nizier Delorme. They arrived on 8 November 1837 with an English Protestant layman named Thomas Boag, who had been resident on the island and had joined them at Tonga seeking passage to Futuna.

=== Martyrdom ===
The group was initially well received by the King of Alo, Niuliki, whose dominion included Futuna. Chanel struggled to learn the local language but eventually mastered it. Despite little apparent success and severe want, he maintained endless patience and courage. On 2 February 1839, a cyclone destroyed almost all the houses and plantations on the island. Chanel laboured faithfully amid the greatest hardships, attending the sick, baptizing the dying, and winning from all the name of "the man with the kind heart". It was a difficult mission, requiring him to cope with isolation and acclimatise to different foods and customs, but it eventually began to bear some fruit. A few natives had been baptised while a few more were being instructed. King Niuliki believed Christianity would undermine his authority as high priest and king. When his son, Meitala, sought to be baptised, the king sent a favored warrior, his son-in-law, Musumusu, to "do whatever was necessary" to resolve the problem. Musumusu went to Meitala and the two fought. Musumusu was injured in the fracas, and went to Chanel feigning need of medical attention. While Chanel tended him, a group of others ransacked the house. Musumusu himself took an axe and clubbed the priest to death, and Chanel died on 28 April 1841.

== Relics ==
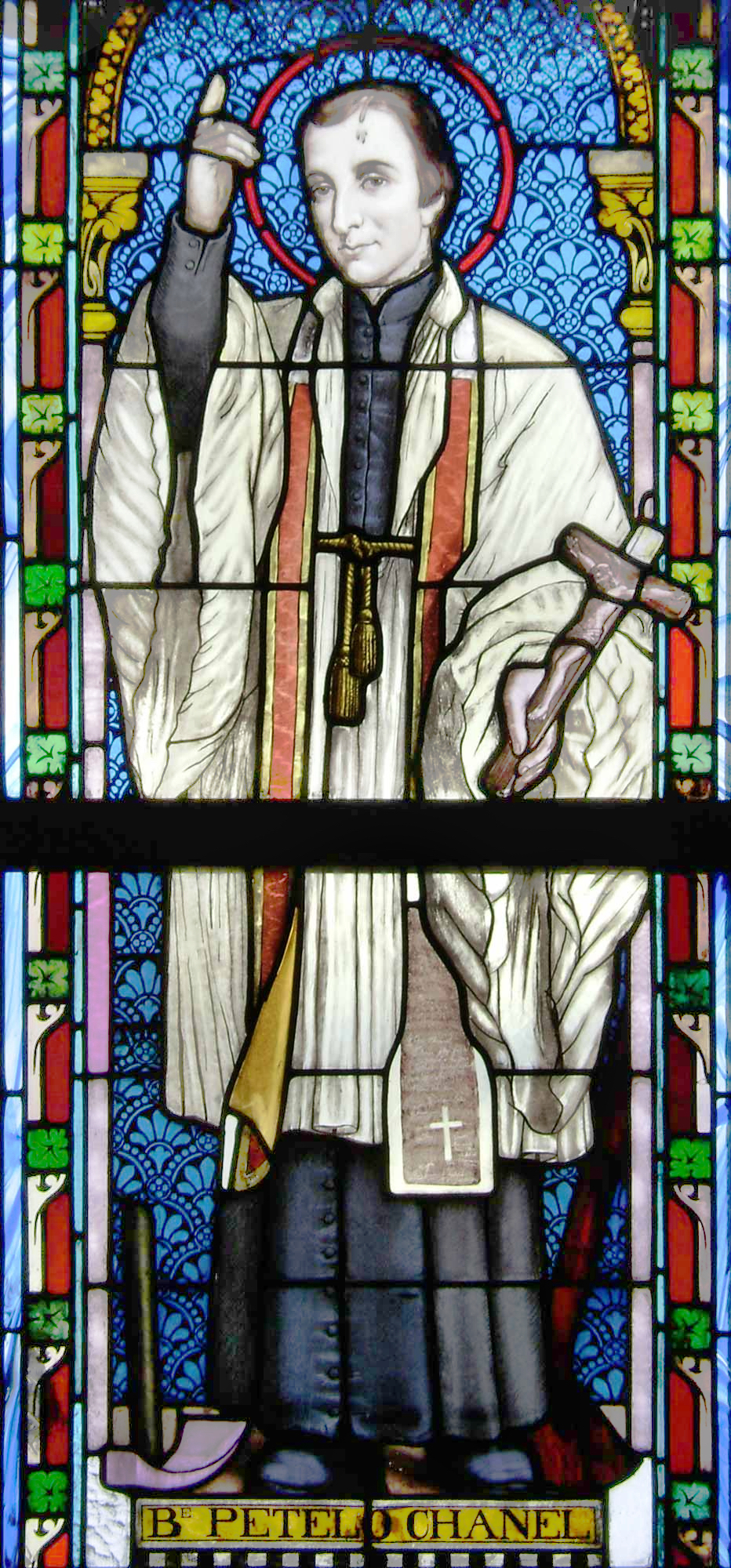
Pierre Chanel (Petelō Saineha), window of the Catholic Church of Lapaha, Tonga

Pompallier heard of Chanel's death on 4 November 1841, while he was at Akaroa, and arranged for a French naval corvette commanded by the Comte du Bouzet, L'Allier, to accompany the mission schooner Sancta Maria and sail on 19 November for Wallis and Futuna, taking with him Philippe Viard. The two vessels arrived at ʻUvea on 30 December 1841. The bishop sent Viard to Futuna, where he landed on 18 January 1842. A chief named Maligi, who had disagreed with Chanel's murder, helped exhume Chanel's body and brought it to the L'Allier the next day, wrapped in several local mats.

The ship's doctor, M. Rault, was able to verify the identity of the remains, bearing in mind the description of the manner of Chanel's death given previously by Marie-Nizier. The doctor undertook to embalm the remains, so that they could be kept, wrapping them in linen and placing them in a cask. The schooner Sancta Maria transported the body back to Kororāreka, New Zealand, arriving on 3 May 1842.

The relics remained in the Bay of Islands until 1849, when they were accompanied by Petitjean to Auckland, New Zealand – most likely early in April 1849. They left New Zealand on 15 April 1849 by the ship Maukin, and arrived in Sydney, Australia, on 4 May. Rocher received the cask holding the bones, and took it to the Procure Chapel at Gladesville in Sydney on 7 May. Rocher was very careful in making the decision as to when to send the container on to England and France. He looked for a trustworthy captain, and a reliable person in London to receive the consignment, attend to the customs, and have it sent on to Lyon. Early in 1850, Bernin, pro-vicar for Bishop Douarre, vicar-apostolic of New Caledonia, had to leave for France. He left Sydney for London on the Waterloo on 1 February 1850, taking Chanel's remains with him. On 1 June 1850, the remains arrived at the motherhouse of the Society of Mary in Lyon. The relics were returned to Futuna in 1977, with Chanel's skull returned to the island in 1985.

== Conversions in Futuna ==
Pompallier sent Catherin Servant, François Roulleaux-Dubignon and Marie Nizier to return to the island, and they arrived on 9 June 1842. Eventually, most islanders converted to Catholicism. Musumusu himself converted, and as he lay dying, expressed the desire to be buried outside the church at Poi so those who came to revere Chanel would walk over his grave to reach it.

The tabloid The Catholic Weekly has claimed that a Tongan dance, the Eke, originated as penitential ritual for Chanel's death.

== Veneration ==
Chanel was declared a martyr and beatified on 17 November 1889. The cause for his canonization was opened on 10 June 1891, and he was canonized on 12 June 1954 by Pope Pius XII. Chanel is recognized as the protomartyr and patron saint of Oceania. His feast day is 28 April, which is a public holiday in Wallis and Futuna.

Chanel is remembered in the Church of England with a commemoration on 28 April.

== Legacy ==
Marist priests and brothers working in Oceania cover a territory as big as Western Europe. The area includes six sovereign nations and two French overseas territories. The Province of Oceania is the largest in the Society of Mary.

Several schools and colleges in Oceania as well as Chanel College, Dublin, are named after him.

== See also ==
- Marcellin Champagnat
- Peter Julian Eymard
- Saint Peter Chanel, patron saint archive
- Pacific Regional Seminary of St Peter Chanel, in Fiji

== Links ==
Roger Burke, Michael Perry, St. Peter Chanel, Patron of Chanel College, Gladstone, Gladstone, Australia: Gladstone Printing Services, 1988
