= Sagato Alofi =

King Sagato Alofi (18 September 1936 – 2002) was the Tu'i Agaifo 1997–2002. He was the son of Lomano Musulamu. In 2002 he died and was succeeded by Soane Patita Maituku.

He was invested as king on 19 July 1997.

Sagato Alofi Tuigaifo of Alo (Futuna)
Regnal titles
Preceded by Esipio Takasi	Tuigaifo of Alo (Futuna); 1997 – 2002	Succeeded by Soane Patita Maituku
