= Kolofau =

Coordinates: 14°20′S 178°02′W

Kolofau (formerly known as Mont de Bougainville) is a mountain in the Wallis and Futuna islands, a French territory in the Pacific Ocean. It is the highest point on Alofi Island.
