= Mont Puke =

Highest mountain in Wallis and Futuna

- Location within Oceania

Highest point
- Elevation: 524 m (1,719 ft)
- Prominence: 524 m (1,719 ft)
- Listing: Territory high point
- Coordinates: 14°16′15″S 178°8′20″W

Geography
- Location: Futuna

Mont Puke, also known as Mont Singavi, is the highest point of the French Polynesian island territory of Wallis and Futuna, at an elevation of 524 metres (1,719 ft).

== Sources ==
- (in English) Mont Puke, Wallis and Futuna, Peakbagger.com.
- (in English) , cia.gov.
