= Ono, Wallis and Futuna =

Ono
- Village
- Location in Futuna Island
- Coordinates: 14°18′38″S 178°6′18″W
- Country: France
- Territory: Wallis and Futuna
- Island: Futuna
- Chiefdom and District: Alo

Population (2018)
  - Total: 524
- Time zone: UTC+12

Ono is the main village and capital of the Alo District on the southern coast of Futuna Island. Its population according to the 2018 census was 524 people. This makes it the largest settlement in the chiefdom of Alo.
