= Vele, Wallis and Futuna =

Vele
- Village
- Location in Futuna Island
- Coordinates: 14°18′40″S 178°3′59″W
- Country: France
- Territory: Wallis and Futuna
- Island: Futuna
- Chiefdom and District: Alo

Population (2018)
  - Total: 209
- Time zone: UTC+12

Vele is a village in Wallis and Futuna. It is located in Alo District on the southeastern coast of Futuna Island. Its population according to the 2018 census was 209 people.

== See also ==
- Pointe Vele Airport
