= Pointe Vele Airport =

Airport in Pointe Vele, Wallis and Futuna

Aéroport de Futuna - Pointe-Vele Pointe Vele Airport
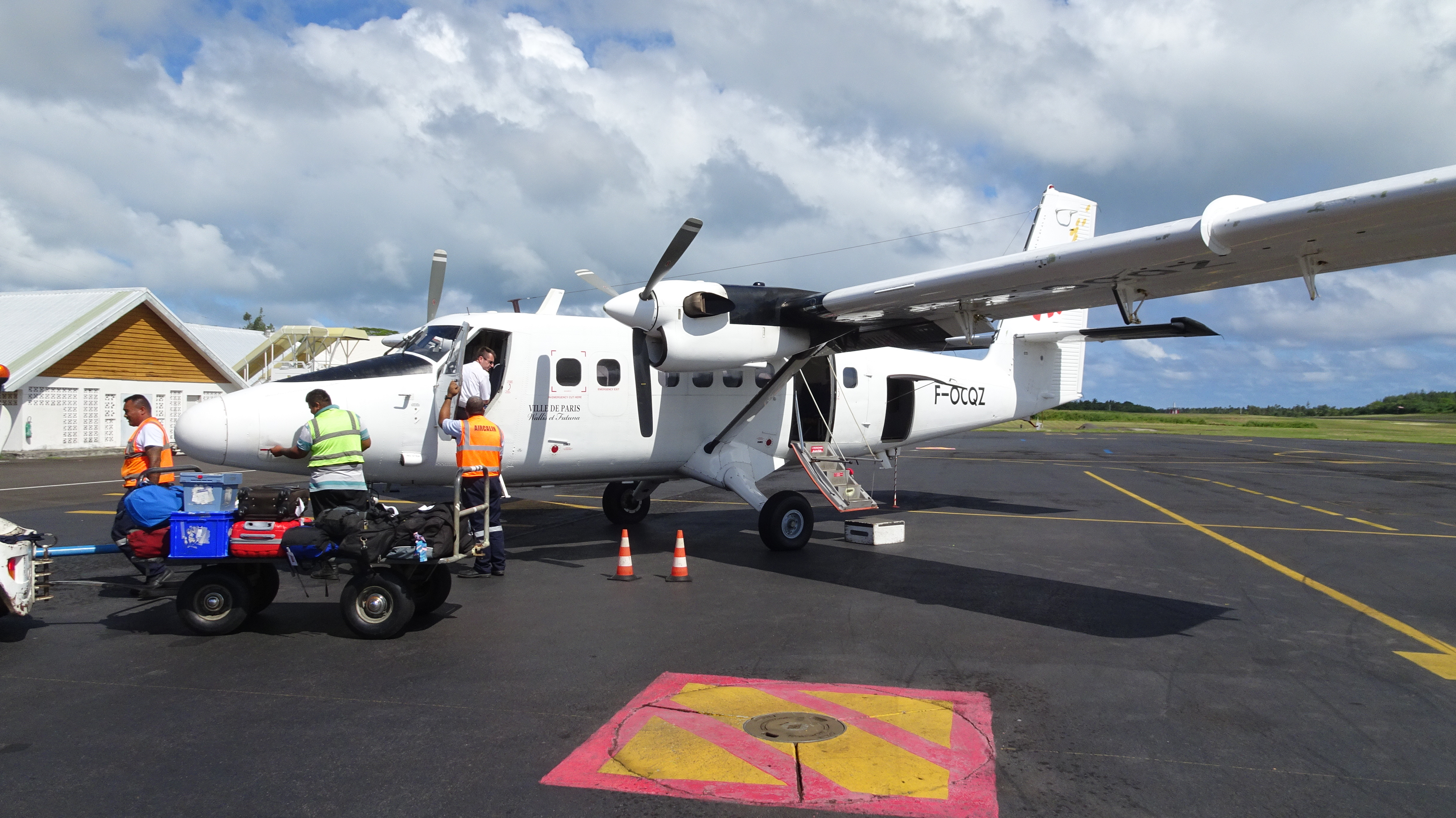
- IATA: FUT; ICAO: NLWF

Summary
- Airport type: Public
- Serves: Vele (Futuna Island, Wallis and Futuna, France)
- Location: Pointe Vele
- Elevation AMSL: 20 ft / 6 m
- Coordinates: 14°18′41″S 178°03′58″W

Map
- Location of airport in Futuna

Runways
Direction	Length		Surface
Direction	m	ft	Surface
07/25	1,000	3,609	Asphalt

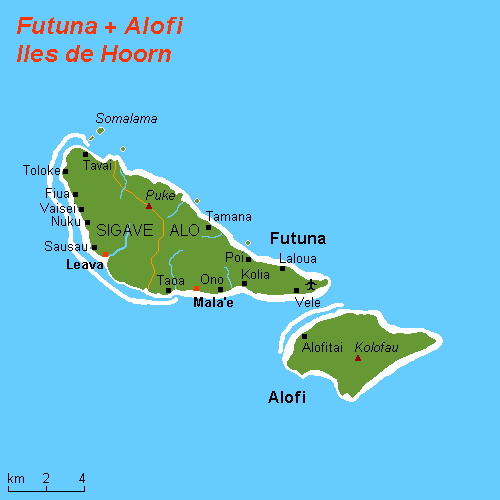
Map of Hoorn Islands (Futuna and Alofi) showing airport location

Pointe Vele Airport (IATA: FUT, ICAO: NLWF) is an airport serving Futuna Island in the French overseas territory of Wallis and Futuna. The airport is located 10 kilometres (6 mi) east of Leava.

== Facilities ==
The airport resides at an elevation of 20 feet (6 m) above mean sea level. It has one runway designated 07/25 with an asphalt surface measuring 1,100 by 25 metres (3,609 ft × 82 ft).

== Statistics ==
Graph showing the change in the number of passengers by year:

== Temperature record ==
On 10 January 2016, the weather station at the airport recorded a temperature of 35.8 °C (96.4 °F), which is the highest temperature to have ever been recorded in Wallis and Futuna.

== See also ==
- Hihifo Airport
- List of airports in Wallis and Futuna
