= Hoorn Islands =

South Pacific island group

Coordinates: 14°16′57″S 178°08′59″W

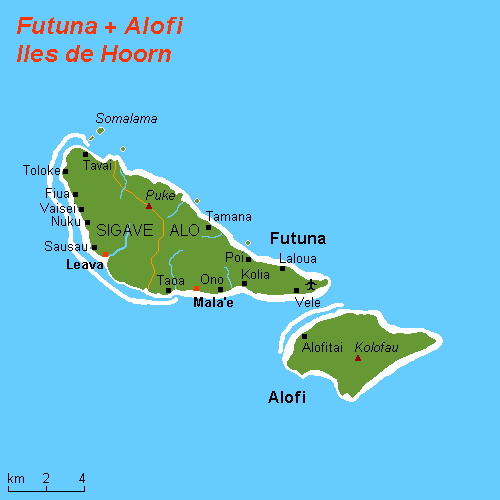
Hoorn Islands

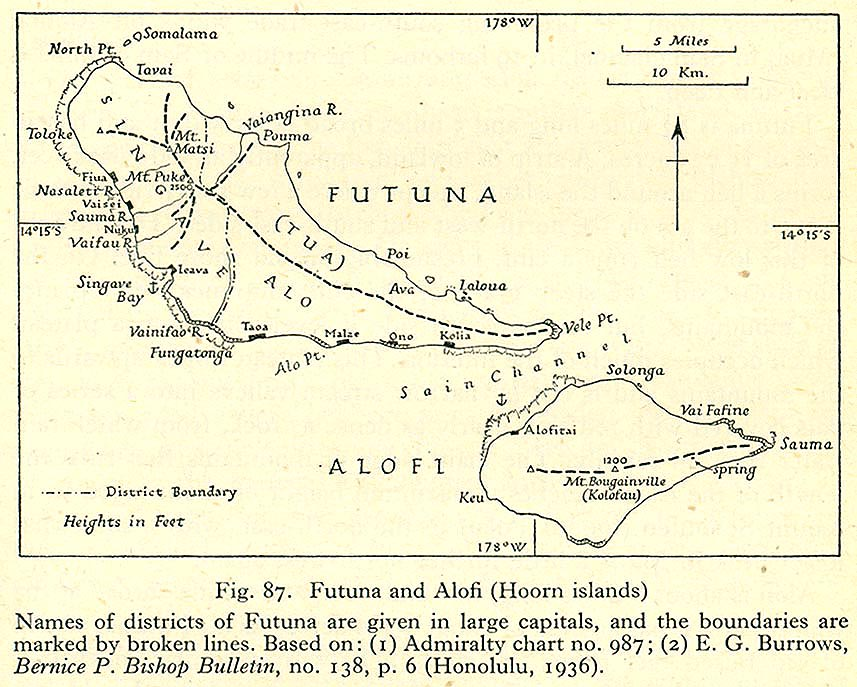
Hoorn Islands (Futuna and Alofi) with Futuna Island in the northwest

The Hoorn Islands (also Futuna Islands, French: îles Horn) are one of two island groups that make up the French overseas collectivity (collectivité d'outre-mer, or COM) of Wallis and Futuna. They consist of two volcanic islands, Futuna and Alofi, located in the South Pacific Ocean. The islands maintain traditional Polynesian governance structures under the French administration. With an aggregate area of 119 km^{2} (46 sq mi), they had a population of 3,226 in 2018.

== History ==
The first settlers on the islands came in 8th century BCE. In the early 16th century CE, Tongans attempted to settle the Futuna Island but were repelled. Samoans settled in the 17th century, with the Dutch explorers arriving in 1616. The archipelago was named by the Dutch navigators Willem Schouten and Jacob Le Maire, who, in 1616, became the first Europeans to visit the islands. They named them after the Dutch city of Hoorn, from which their expedition had started. They had previously rounded and named Cape Horn on the same voyage; Schouten had been born in Hoorn.

French Catholic missionaries were the first Europeans to permanently settle in 1837, who converted the population to Catholicism by 1846. The islands became part of a French protectorate after the king Lavelua asked for them in 1842. Until 1961, they were part of a French protectorate administered from New Caledonia, after which they were part of the French overseas territory of Wallis and Futuna, which became a French overseas collectivity in 2003.

== Geography ==
Hoorn Islands are one of the two island groups of which the French overseas collectivity of Wallis and Futuna. The islands lie northeast of Fiji, northwest of Tonga and west of Samoa in the South Pacific Ocean. The archipelago lies 230 km (140 mi) southwest of Wallis Island, and consists of two volcanic islands of Futuna (85 sq.km) and Alofi (35 sq.km) separated by a 1.5 km (0.93 mi) wide ocean channel. These are high altitude islands, with no lagoons, with the highest point being Mont Puke at 524 m (1,719 ft). The islands are surrounded by coral reefs of varying width with the only break at Leava, the major town in the islands. The climate is typified by heavy rainfallwith high humidity, and high temperatures. The islands have a thick forest cover and rich biodiversity.

== Demographics ==
In 2018, the population of Futuna was 3,225, and Alofi had a single resident. The residents are French citizens and are entitled to vote in the French elections. The President of France is the Head of State, who is represented by a prefect with executive power. The Territorial Assembly, composed of democratically elected members, elected for five year terms, is responsible for most social and economic matters. There are also two municipal councils (Alo and Sigave), based on the islands’ traditional governance structure. These are headed by Aliki saus, who have executive authority over customary issues, and are assisted by five ministers and a police chief.

== See also ==
- Wallis Island (Uvea)
