= Alo (Wallis and Futuna) =

Alo Tu`a / Kingdom of Futuna
- Chiefdom and District
- Flag

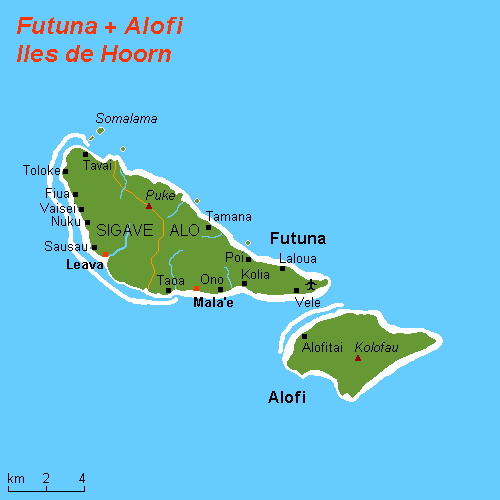
- Alo and Sigave within the Hoorn Islands
- Coordinates: 14°18′33.77″S 178°7′24.78″W
- Country: France
- Territory: Wallis and Futuna
- Island: Futuna and Alofi
- Capital: Ono

Government
  - King (Tu`i Agaifo): Lino Leleivai

Area
  - Total: 53 km^{2} (20 sq mi)

Population (2018)
  - Total: 1,950
  - Density: 47/km^{2} (120/sq mi)
- Time zone: UTC+12
- ISO 3166 code: WF-AL
- No. of districts: 1 (Alo)
- No. of municipalities: 9

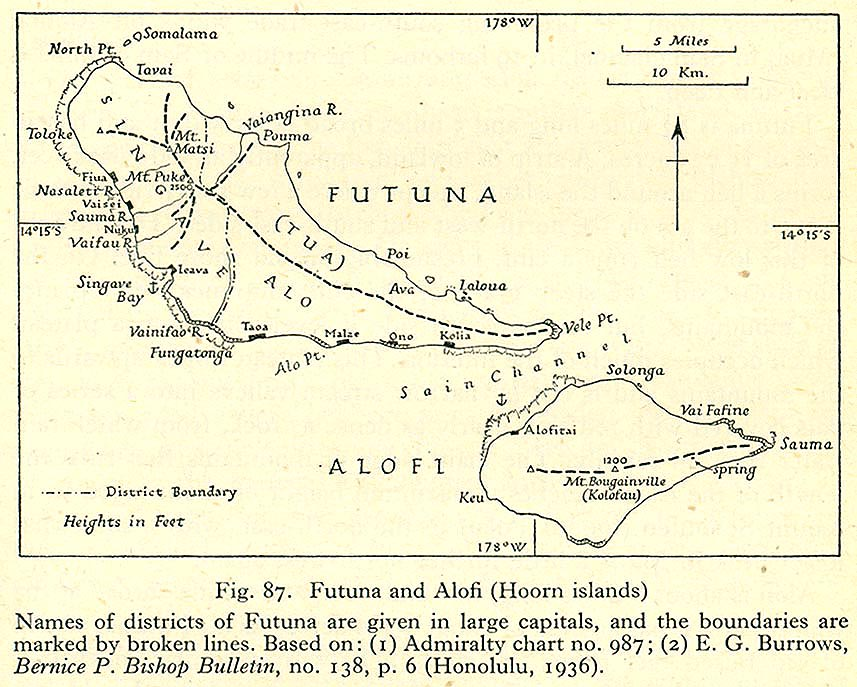
Map of Hoorn Islands

Alo (also known unofficially as Tu`a or the Kingdom of Futuna) is one of three official chiefdoms of the French territory of Wallis and Futuna, in Oceania, in the South Pacific Ocean. (The other two chiefdoms are Uvea and Sigave.)

== Geography ==
=== Overview ===
The chiefdom known as Alo encompasses the eastern two thirds of Futuna Island - 53 square kilometres (20 sq mi) out of 83 square kilometres (32 sq mi)) - and all of Alofi Island (32 square kilometres (12 sq mi) (which is virtually uninhabited). Alofi Island lies 2 kilometres (1.2 mi) to the southeast of Futuna Island. The total area of the chiefdom is 85 square kilometres (33 sq mi). It comprises nine villages, which together have a population is 1,950 (as of the 2018 census). The capital and largest village of Alo is Ono, which has about 738 residents. The current Tu`i Agaifo or king of the Kingdom of Alo is Lino Leleivai, who has served in this position since his coronation on 29 November 2018 (after the previous king, Filipo Katoa, abdicated because of health concerns). The island bird is a hawk.

=== Administrative division ===
The chiefdom is coextensive with the district of the same name. Alo's nine villages (or municipalities) are as follows:

| Village | Population | District | Island |
|---|---|---|---|
| Ono | 524 | Alo | Futuna |
| Taoa | 480 | Alo | Futuna |
| Kolia | 254 | Alo | Futuna |
| Vele | 209 | Alo | Futuna |
| Poi | 160 | Alo | Futuna |
| Mala'e | 168 | Alo | Futuna |
| Tamana | 152 | Alo | Futuna |
| Tuatafa | 2 | Alo | Futuna |
| Alofitai | 1 | Alo | Alofi |

== See also ==
- Hoorn Islands
- List of kings of Alo
- Pointe Vele Airport
- Customary kingdoms of Wallis and Futuna
