= Alofi Island =

Island in Wallis and Futuna

Coordinates: 14.34°S 178.04°W

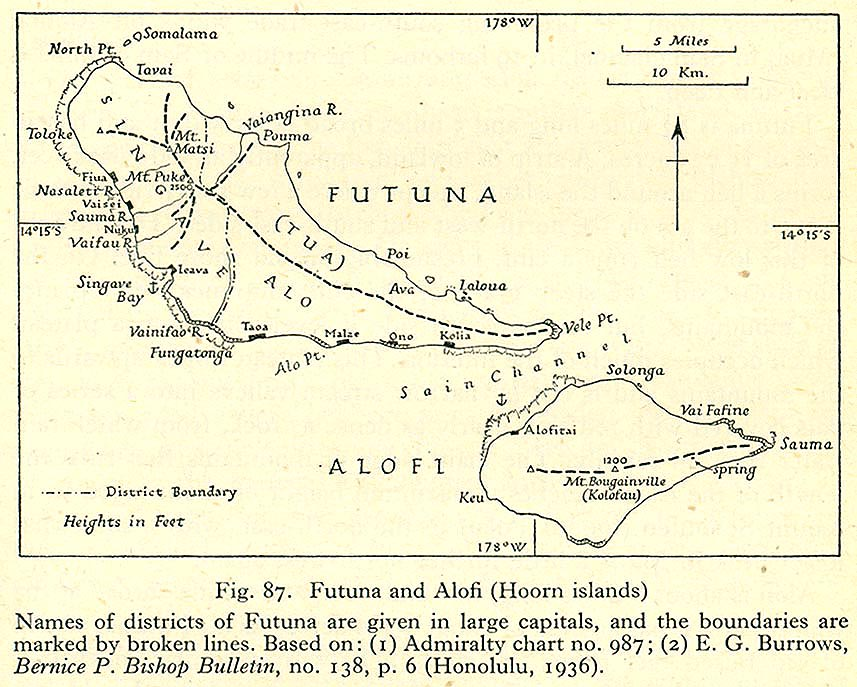
Hoorn Islands (Futuna and Alofi) with Alofi Island in the southeast

Alofi is an uninhabited island in the Pacific Ocean belonging to the French overseas collectivity (collectivité d'outre-mer, or COM) of Wallis and Futuna. Data shows that Alofi was inhabited until 1840. The highest point on the island is Kolofau. The 3,500 ha island is separated from the larger neighbouring island of Futuna by a 1.7 km channel. Alofi has been recognised as an Important Bird Area (IBA) by BirdLife International for its red-footed booby colony and the vulnerable shy ground dove, as well as for various restricted-range bird species (including crimson-crowned fruit doves, blue-crowned lorikeets, Polynesian wattled honeyeaters, Polynesian trillers, Fiji shrikebills and Polynesian starlings).
