= Futuna (Wallis and Futuna) =

Island in the Hoorn island group

Native name: Futuna
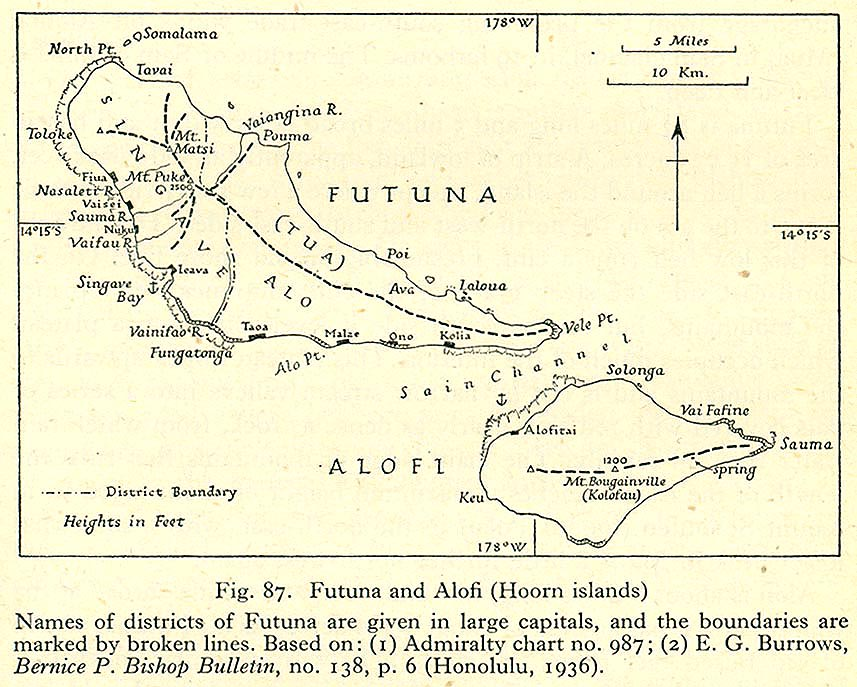
- The Hoorn Islands Futuna and Alofi. Futuna Island in the northwest.
- Interactive map of Futuna

Geography
- Location: South Pacific Ocean
- Coordinates: 14°16′30″S 178°08′24″W
- Archipelago: Îles Horne
- Area: 80 km^{2} (31 sq mi)
- Highest elevation: 524 m (1719 ft)
- Highest point: Mont Puke

Administration
- French overseas departments and territories
- Province: Wallis and Futuna

Demographics
- Population: 3225 (2018)
- Ethnic groups: Polynesians

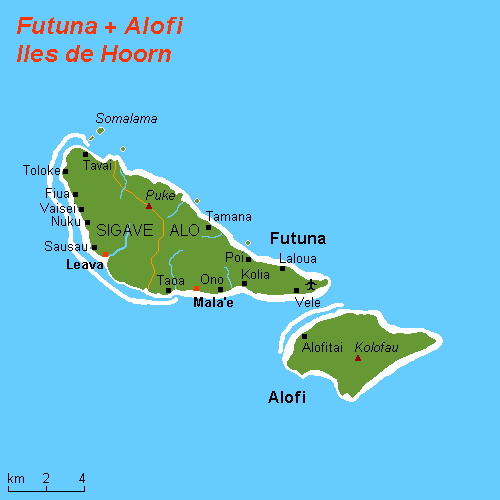
The Hoorn Islands.

Futuna (/fuːˈtuːnə/; French: [fu.tu.na]) is the largest island in Hoorn Islands or Îles Horne, located in the Pacific Ocean, part of the French overseas collectivity (collectivité d'outre-mer) of Wallis and Futuna. The island occupies an area of 80 km^{2} (30 sq mi) and as of 2018 it has a population of 3,225.

Futuna is a local name, the etymology of which is unknown.

== History ==
The first Europeans to map Futuna and Alofi were Willem Schouten and Jacob Le Maire in 1616 during their circumnavigation of the globe on the ship Eendracht. After sailing to Niuafoʻou, they suddenly changed course from west to northwest, thereby bringing them to these two islands. The islands were given the exonym Hoorn Eylanden, after the city of Hoorn, Schouten's birthplace. This became Horne in French and English. They also discovered a natural harbor along the southwest coast of Futuna, which they named Eendrachts baai (Unity Bay) after their ship. It is thought that their landing place was the site of the Anse de Sigave near what is today called Leava.

Schouten and Le Maire had learned from earlier experiences how to approach islanders successfully. Upon landing, they went ashore, and, when approached by some of the natives, they made a show of force. This opened the way for a peaceful barter, with the natives offering coconuts, yams, and hogs in exchange for the sailors’ iron nails, beads and knives. The sailors went on to get fresh water and meet the king, who told his subjects that their guests were not to be disturbed by petty thieving. This way, the Dutch sailors were able to replenish their stocks without risk of theft. A few days after they arrived, the king of the other island, Alofi, came to visit, bringing with him 300 men. A feast was prepared and a kava ceremony and ʻumu were organised. Schouten and Le Maire were likely the first Europeans to witness these ceremonies.

Without the risk of theft or hostilities, Schouten and Le Maire were able to study Futuna more thoroughly than had been possible for them in the case of the Niua islands. They did not visit Alofi. Their description of the islanders’ appearance and behavior was not flattering. Although they praise the men for being well-proportioned, they found the women ugly and ill-shaped, with breasts hanging down to their bellies like empty satchels. The people were said to all go naked, and to copulate in public, even in front of their king.

In the 19th century, whaling ships from the United States and elsewhere called at Futuna for water, wood, and food. The first one known to have called was the Independence in 1827.

== Geography ==
Futuna and Alofi are both remnants of the same extinct volcano, now bordering with a fringing reef. Futuna's highest point is Mont Puke at 524 m (1,719 ft) above sea level, and the island has an area of 83 km^{2} (32 sq mi), with 53 km^{2} (20 sq mi) in Sigave and 30 km^{2} (12 sq mi) in Alo. It is separated from Wallis Island to the north by water deeper than 4,500 m (14,800 ft) in the Vitiaz Trench.

=== Geology ===
Futuna island has large Upper Pliocene volcanic lava flows, as well as breccias and hyaloclastite deposits from underwater eruptions.

=== Tectonics ===
Futuna is on the Futuna Ridge (Futuna–Alofi volcanic ridge) that lies along a boundary of interaction between the colliding Pacific and Australia plate, between the North Fiji transform fault to the south and the now inactive tectonically Vitiaz Trench. However the full tectonic role of the ridge and associated features is still not understood. As recently as March 2000 this ridge was discovered to be a spreading center extending over a distance of more than 200 km (120 mi) from the north of Fiji to the northwest of Futuna Island and a boundary of the Futuna plate which is a slightly ill defined microplate with triple junctions with the Pacific and Australian plates. The northern part of the ridge contains basaltic volcanoes such as Utu Uli that are younger than 780,000 years old and at depths of more than 1,000 m (3,300 ft) precluding explosive eruptions, so that their eruptions are effusive. There is a 30 km (19 mi) wide area of seafloor to the east of Futuna, with a WSW-ENE orientation, and with many volcanoes known as the South-East Futuna Volcanic Zone (SEFVZ). This contains the significant volcanoes of Ono, Tasi Tulo, Fatu Kapa and Kulo Lasi all south of the Vitiaz Trench. The young seafloor produced by these volcanoes in the SEFVZ means that the past tectonics is poorly understood as timings from say magnetic field changes cannot be obtained. The area is interacting with the spreading centers in the Lau Basin further to the east and southeast.

=== Tsunami risk ===
The island was affected by the 2009 Samoa earthquake and tsunami with a run up height to 4.4 m (14 ft) and up to 95 m (312 ft) inland inundation. Studies afterwards revealed past tsunami events have occurred.

=== Climate ===
Futuna (Maopoopo weather station) has a tropical rainforest climate (Köppen climate classification Af). The average annual temperature in Maopoopo is 27.5 °C (81.5 °F). The average annual rainfall is 3,333.6 mm (131.24 in) with December as the wettest month. The temperatures are highest on average in February, at around 28.2 °C (82.8 °F), and lowest in August, at around 26.5 °C (79.7 °F). The highest temperature ever recorded in Maopoopo was 35.8 °C (96.4 °F) on 10 January 2016; the coldest temperature ever recorded was 19.0 °C (66.2 °F) on 12 August 1980.

Climate data for Futuna (Maopoopo weather station, 1991–2020 averages, extremes 1979−present)
Month	Jan	Feb	Mar	Apr	May	Jun	Jul	Aug	Sep	Oct	Nov	Dec	Year
Record high °C (°F)	35.8 (96.4)	35.0 (95.0)	34.2 (93.6)	33.9 (93.0)	33.4 (92.1)	32.6 (90.7)	31.9 (89.4)	32.3 (90.1)	33.0 (91.4)	33.9 (93.0)	33.8 (92.8)	34.6 (94.3)	35.8 (96.4)
Mean daily maximum °C (°F)	31.2 (88.2)	31.2 (88.2)	31.1 (88.0)	30.7 (87.3)	29.9 (85.8)	29.1 (84.4)	28.6 (83.5)	28.7 (83.7)	29.2 (84.6)	29.7 (85.5)	30.4 (86.7)	30.9 (87.6)	30.1 (86.2)
Daily mean °C (°F)	28.2 (82.8)	28.2 (82.8)	28.2 (82.8)	27.9 (82.2)	27.4 (81.3)	27.0 (80.6)	26.5 (79.7)	26.5 (79.7)	26.8 (80.2)	27.1 (80.8)	27.6 (81.7)	28.0 (82.4)	27.5 (81.5)
Mean daily minimum °C (°F)	25.2 (77.4)	25.2 (77.4)	25.2 (77.4)	25.2 (77.4)	24.9 (76.8)	24.8 (76.6)	24.3 (75.7)	24.2 (75.6)	24.4 (75.9)	24.5 (76.1)	24.8 (76.6)	25.1 (77.2)	24.8 (76.6)
Record low °C (°F)	21.3 (70.3)	21.9 (71.4)	21.2 (70.2)	21.8 (71.2)	20.9 (69.6)	21.5 (70.7)	20.1 (68.2)	19.0 (66.2)	19.5 (67.1)	20.7 (69.3)	20.9 (69.6)	20.6 (69.1)	19.0 (66.2)
Average precipitation mm (inches)	329.2 (12.96)	354.1 (13.94)	341.3 (13.44)	308.3 (12.14)	262.6 (10.34)	185.6 (7.31)	175.1 (6.89)	181.8 (7.16)	225.6 (8.88)	244.2 (9.61)	324.1 (12.76)	401.7 (15.81)	3,333.6 (131.24)
Average precipitation days (≥ 1.0 mm)	19.7	18.7	20.5	19.1	16.2	14.7	13.9	14.5	15.2	16.7	18.2	20.1	207.6
Mean monthly sunshine hours	175.7	160.2	—	154.4	—	120.1	121.3	125.5	135.0	154.9	165.8	180.3	—
Source: Météo France

== Demographics ==
As of the 2018 census, the population of the island was 3,225, with 1,950 residing in the Alo district and 1,275 in Sigave. Futuna makes up approximately 27.9% of the population of Wallis and Futuna. The most spoken languages on Futuna are Futunan (94.5%), French (5.3%), and Wallisian (0.2%).

== Culture ==
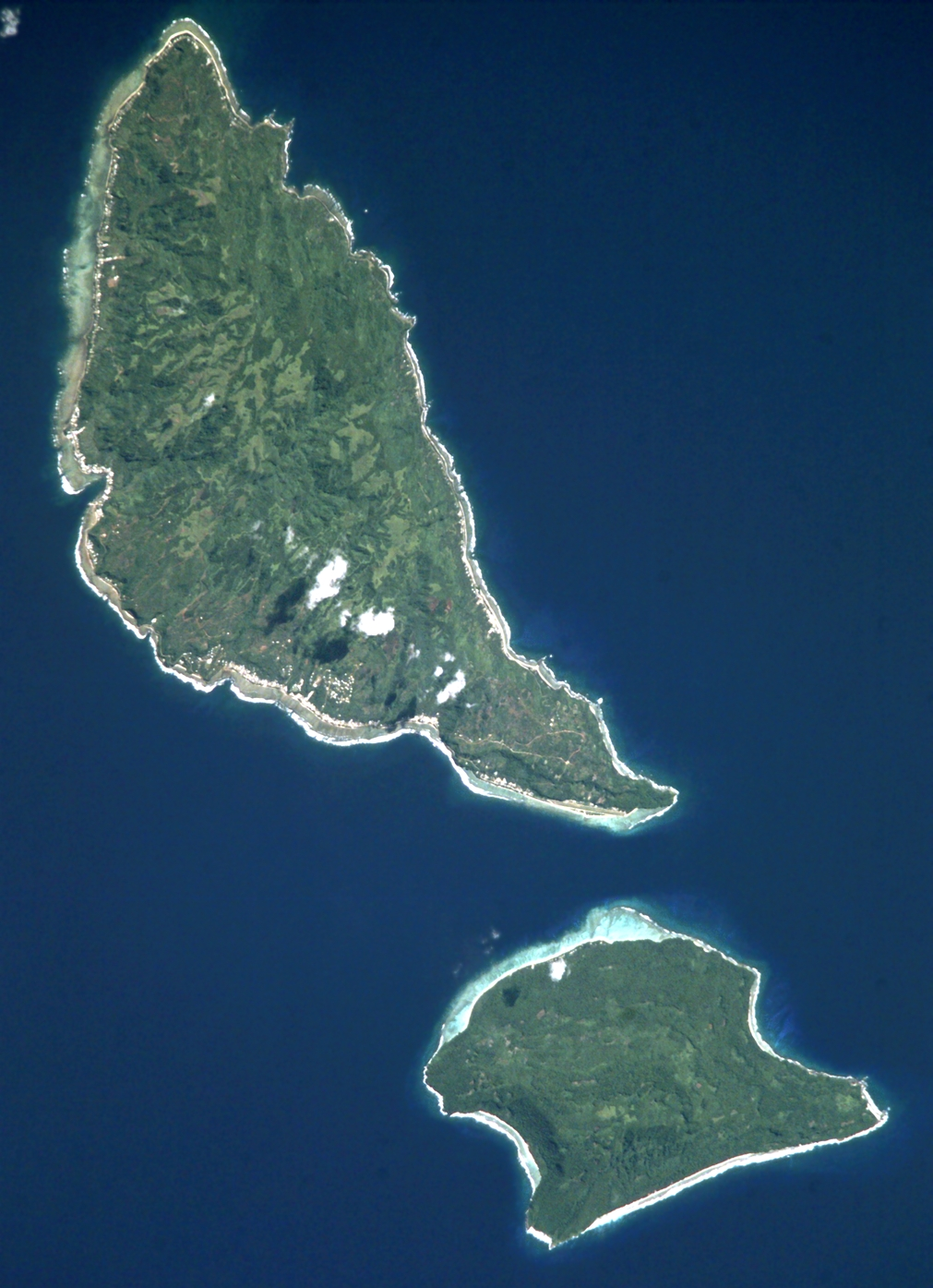
Futuna and Alofi (photo: NASA)

Two kings, elected from the local nobility every few years, rule the population in conjunction with French authorities. They are the king of Sigave, the western province, and the king of Alo, the eastern province including Alofi. Except for Poi all villages are along the southwest coast, and they are from west to east: Toloke, Fiua, Vaisei, Nuku, and Leava (capital with the wharf) in Sigave, and Taoa, Malaʻe, Ono, Kolia and Vele (at the airstrip) in Alo.

99% of the population of Wallis and Futuna are Catholic. Although the island is closer to Tonga and farther from Samoa than ʻUvea, the vernacular and culture are more Samoan.

Futuna is where Pierre Chanel was martyred in 1841, becoming Polynesia's only Catholic saint. The cathedral of Poi now stands on the site where he was martyred.

== Education ==
There are six primary schools on Futuna. The island also has two junior high schools (collèges): Fiua de Sigave and Sisia d'Ono. Residents are served by a senior high school/sixth-form college, Lycée d'Etat de Wallis et Futuna, on Wallis.

== See also ==
- Pointe Vele Airport
- Peter Chanel
- Customary kingdoms of Wallis and Futuna
