= Outline of Wallis and Futuna =

Overview of and topical guide to Wallis and Futuna

The Flag of Wallis and Futuna

The Coat of arms of Wallis and Futuna

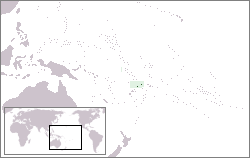
The location of Wallis and Futuna

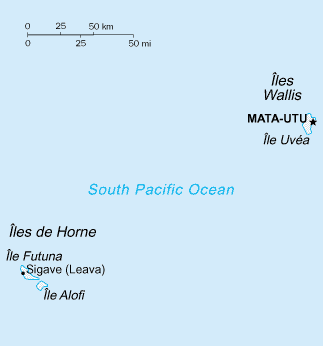
An enlargeable map of the French Overseas Collectivity of the Wallis and Futuna Islands

The following outline is provided as an overview of and topical guide to Wallis and Futuna:

Wallis and Futuna – French island territory in Polynesia (but not part of, or even contiguous with, French Polynesia) in the South Pacific Ocean between Fiji and Samoa. It comprises three main volcanic tropical islands and a number of tiny islets. The territory is split into two island groups lying about 260 km apart:

- Wallis Islands (Uvea), in the north
  - Wallis Island (Uvea)
- Hoorn Islands (Futuna Islands), in the south
  - Futuna
  - Alofi

Since 2003 Wallis and Futuna has been a French overseas collectivity (collectivité d'outre-mer, or COM).

== General reference ==
- Pronunciation:
- Common English country name: Wallis and Futuna or the Wallis and Futuna Islands
- Official English country name: The French Overseas Collectivity of the Wallis and Futuna Islands
- Common endonym(s):
- Official endonym(s):
- Adjectival(s): Wallisian, Futunan
- Demonym(s): Wallisian, Futunan
- Etymology:
- ISO country codes: WF, WLF, 876
- ISO region codes: See ISO 3166-2:WF
- Internet country code top-level domain: .wf

== Geography of Wallis and Futuna ==
Geography of Wallis and Futuna

- Wallis and Futuna is: A French overseas collectivity
- Location:
  - Southern Hemisphere and Eastern Hemisphere
  - Pacific Ocean
    - South Pacific Ocean
      - Oceania
        - Polynesia
  - Time zone: UTC+12
  - Extreme points of Wallis and Futuna
    - High: Mont Puke on Futuna 524 m (1,719 ft)
    - Low: South Pacific Ocean 0 m
  - Land boundaries: none
  - Coastline: South Pacific Ocean 129 km
- Population of Wallis and Futuna: 15,000
- Area of Wallis and Futuna: 264
- Atlas of Wallis and Futuna

=== Environment of Wallis and Futuna ===
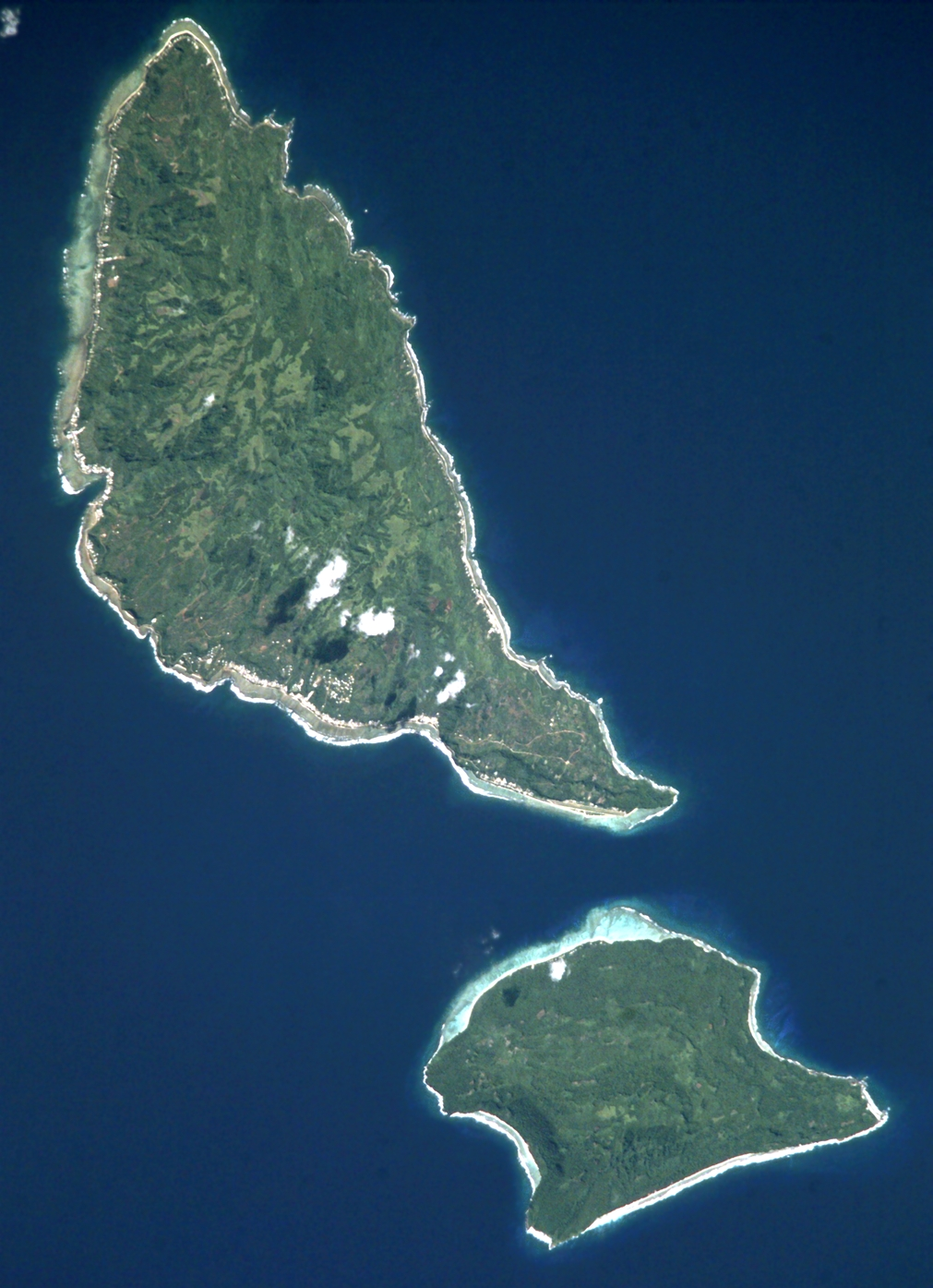
An enlargeable satellite image of the islands of Futuna and Alofi

- Climate of Wallis and Futuna
- Birds of Wallis and Futuna
- Mammals of Wallis and Futuna

==== Natural geographic features of Wallis and Futuna ====
- Rivers of Wallis and Futuna

=== Regions of Wallis and Futuna ===
==== Administrative divisions of Wallis and Futuna ====
Administrative divisions of Wallis and Futuna

===== Municipalities of Wallis and Futuna =====
- Capital of Wallis and Futuna: Mata-Utu
- Cities of Wallis and Futuna

=== Demography of Wallis and Futuna ===
Demographics of Wallis and Futuna

== Government and politics of Wallis and Futuna ==
Politics of Wallis and Futuna

- Form of government: parliamentary representative democratic French overseas collectivity
- Capital of Wallis and Futuna: Mata-Utu
- Elections in Wallis and Futuna
- Political parties in Wallis and Futuna

=== Branches of the government of Wallis and Futuna ===
Government of Wallis and Futuna

==== Legislative branch of the government of Wallis and Futuna ====
- Parliament of Wallis and Futuna

=== Foreign relations of Wallis and Futuna ===
==== International organization membership ====
The Territory of Wallis and Futuna is a member of:

- Pacific Islands Forum (PIF) (observer)
- The Pacific Community (SPC)
- Universal Postal Union (UPU)
- World Federation of Trade Unions (WFTU)

== History of Wallis and Futuna ==
History of Wallis and Futuna

== Culture of Wallis and Futuna ==
Culture of Wallis and Futuna

- Dance of Wallis and Futuna
- Languages of Wallis and Futuna
- Coat of arms of Wallis and Futuna
- Flag of Wallis and Futuna
- National anthem of Wallis and Futuna
- Public holidays in Wallis and Futuna

=== Sports in Wallis and Futuna ===
Sports in Wallis and Futuna

- Football in Wallis and Futuna

== Economy and infrastructure of Wallis and Futuna ==
Economy of Wallis and Futuna

- Economic rank, by nominal GDP (2007):
- Communications in Wallis and Futuna
- Currency of Wallis and Futuna: Franc
  - ISO 4217: XPF
- Transport in Wallis and Futuna
  - Airports in Wallis and Futuna

== Education in Wallis and Futuna ==
Education in Wallis and Futuna

== See also ==
Wallis and Futuna

- List of international rankings
- List of Wallis and Futuna-related topics
- Outline of France
- Outline of geography
- Outline of Oceania
- Statute of Wallis and Futuna (1961)
