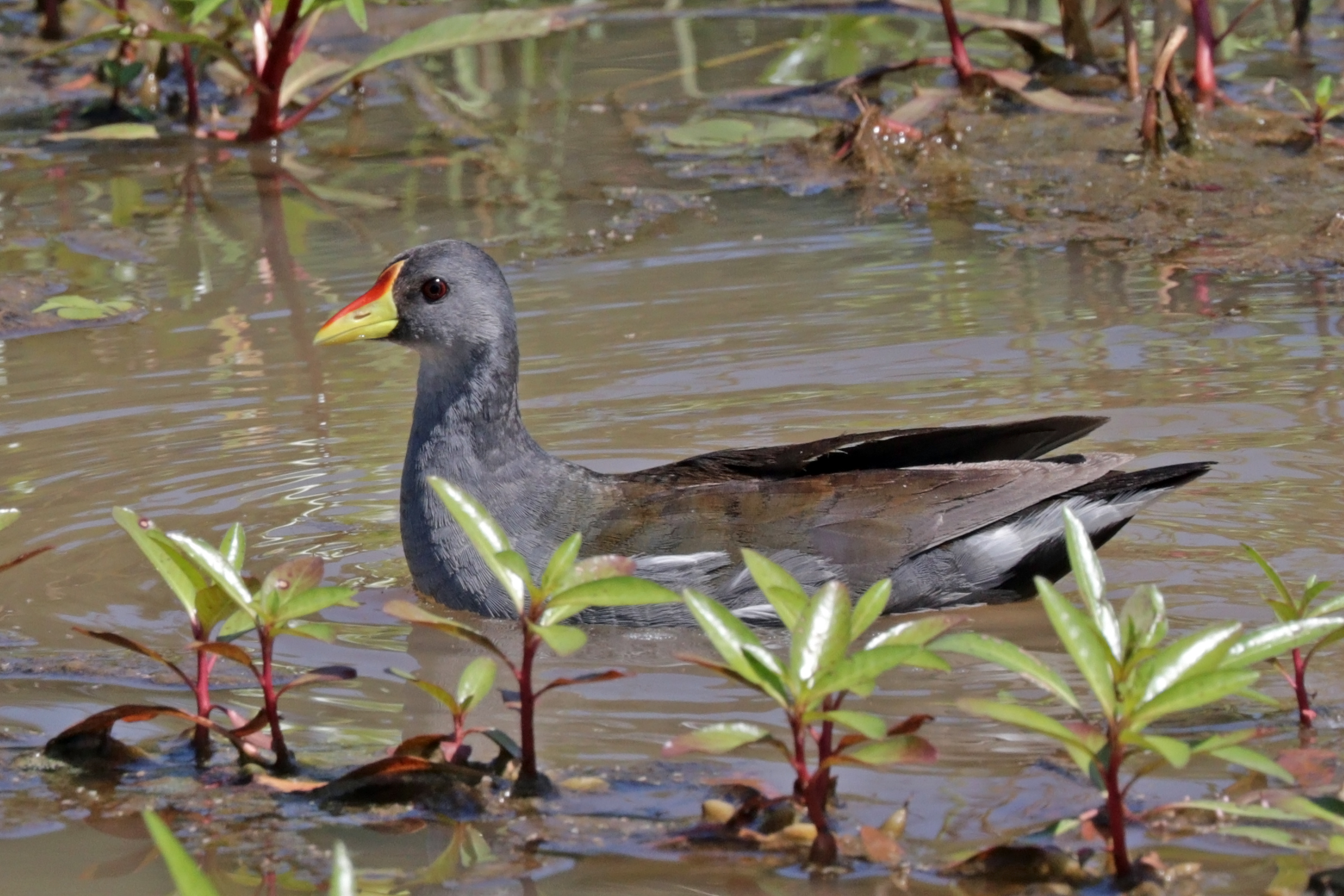
- Matetsi Safari Area, Zimbabwe

Conservation status
- Least Concern (IUCN 3.1)

Scientific classification
- Kingdom: Animalia
- Phylum: Chordata
- Class: Aves
- Order: Gruiformes
- Family: Rallidae
- Genus: Paragallinula; Sangster, Garcia-R & Trewick, 2015
- Species: P. angulata

Binomial name
- Paragallinula angulata (Sundevall, 1850)

Synonyms
- Gallinula angulata Sundevall, 1851

= Lesser moorhen =

Species of bird

The lesser moorhen (Paragallinula angulata) is a species of bird in the family Rallidae. It is sometimes placed into the genus Gallinula. It is the only member of the genus Paragallinula.

== Taxonomy ==
The lesser moorhen was formerly placed in the genus Gallinula, but a 2015 molecular genetic study demonstrated that Gallinula was composed of four distinct lineages. The genus was split into four genera: Gallinula (sensu stricto), Paragallinula, Porphyriops, and Tribonyx.

P. angulata is the only known species of Paragallinula which makes Paragallinula a monotypic genus.

The name Paragallinula comes from the Greek para 'beside' and the genus Gallinula. It is named for its similarity with the members of Gallinula, but it also indicates its unique genetic lineage.

== Distribution ==
The lesser moorhen is widely spread across Sub-Saharan Africa (excluding Southern Africa and Madagascar). It was once recorded in the Western Palearctic as a rare vagrant. This species has also been sighted in Brazil, Egypt, Morocco, and Oman.
