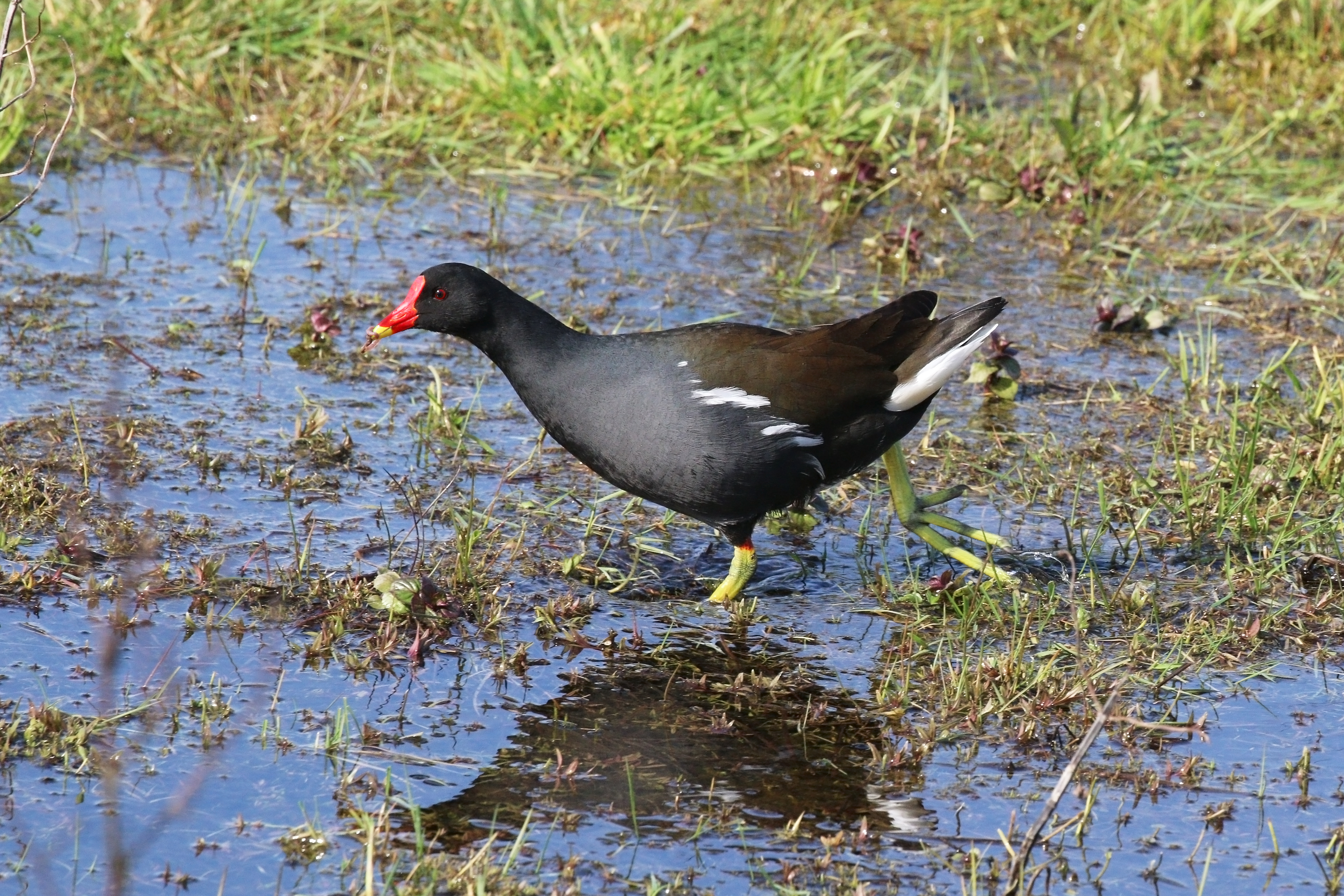
- Common moorhen Gallinula chloropus

Scientific classification
- Kingdom: Animalia
- Phylum: Chordata
- Class: Aves
- Order: Gruiformes
- Family: Rallidae
- Genus: Gallinula; Brisson, 1760

Type species
- Fulica chloropus Linnaeus, 1758

Species
- see text

Synonyms
- Edithornis; Pareudiastes

= Moorhen =

Moorhens Temporal range: Late Oligocene to recent

Genus of birds

Moorhens are medium-sized water birds in the genus Gallinula, Latin for 'little hen', in the rail family Rallidae. The genus currently includes seven species, of which one is extinct, and two others probably are. Three species formerly included in Gallinula have been found to have enough differences to be placed in two separate but closely related genera, Paragallinula (with one species, lesser moorhen Paragallinula angulata), and Tribonyx, the two native hens of Australia; Tribonyx differs visually by shorter, thicker and stubbier toes and bills, and longer tails that lack the white signal pattern of typical moorhens. The moorhens are also close relatives of the coots (Fulica), but the swamphens (Porphyrio), formerly also thought to be close relatives, are now known to be less closely related.

== Description ==
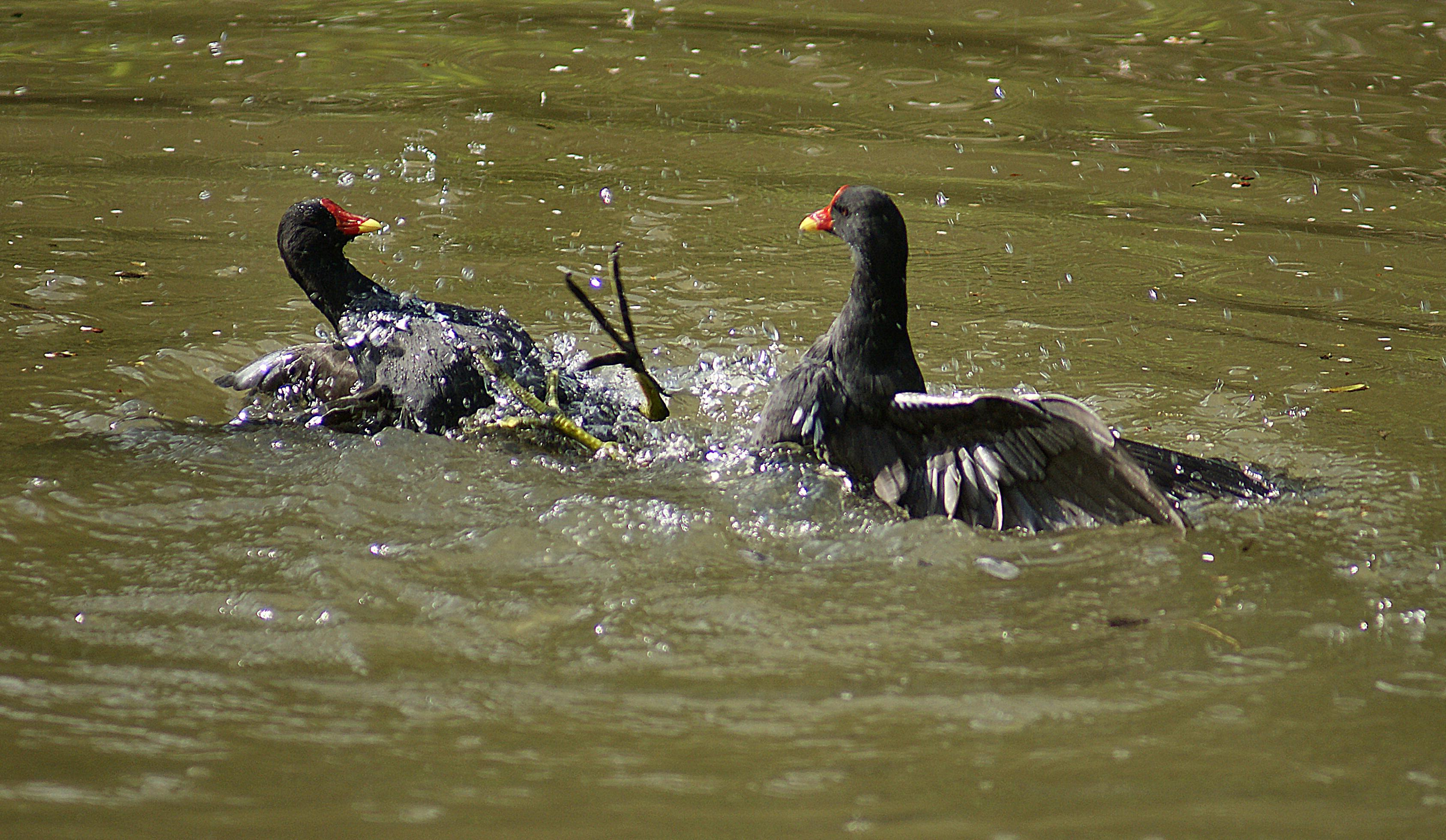
Common moorhens fighting

These rails are dumpy, compact birds with mostly brown and black with some white markings in their plumage; they range from 25 to 40 cm long. The bills are red, mostly with a yellow tip, and the legs are yellowish-green to yellowish-orange; the toes are long, but not webbed, nor lobed as in coots. Unlike many of the rails, they are usually easy to see because they feed in open water margins rather than hidden in reedbeds.

They have short rounded wings and are weak fliers, although usually capable of covering long distances. The common moorhen in particular migrates up to 2,000 km (1,200 mi) from some of its breeding areas in the colder parts of Siberia. Those that migrate do so at night. The Gough moorhen is almost flightless, and can fly only short distances. Loss of flight appears to have evolved independently in the moorhens of Gough and Tristan da Cunha, illustrating the repeated evolution of flightlessness among insular gallinules. More broadly, flightlessness has evolved repeatedly in island-dwelling rails, with the Rallidae showing a particular propensity for this form of evolution.

Moorhens can walk well on their strong legs, and the long toes are well adapted to soft uneven surfaces. They can swim well, despite the lack of webs on the toes.

These birds are omnivorous, consuming plant material, small rodents, amphibians and eggs. They are aggressively territorial during the breeding season, but are otherwise often found in flocks on the shallow vegetated lakes they prefer.

== Systematics and evolution ==
The genus Gallinula was introduced by the French zoologist Mathurin Jacques Brisson in 1760 with the common moorhen (Gallinula chloropus) as the type species.

=== Species ===
The genus contains five extant, one recently extinct, and two possibly extinct species.

Image	Common name	Scientific name	Distribution and notes
	Dusky moorhen	Gallinula tenebrosa Gould, 1846	Australia, New Guinea, southeastern Indonesia, New Caledonia
	Common gallinule	Gallinula galeata (Lichtenstein, 1818)	Americas, including Bermuda, the Galápagos Islands, and Hawaii
	Common moorhen	Gallinula chloropus (Linnaeus, 1758)	Europe, Asia, Africa, Macaronesia; widespread
	†Tristan moorhen	Gallinula nesiotis P. L. Sclater, 1861	Tristan da Cunha, extinct (late 19th century). Formerly sometimes placed in Porphyriornis.
	Gough moorhen	Gallinula comeri J. A. Allen, 1892	Gough Island off Tristan da Cunha. Introduced on Tristan da Cunha as ecological replacement for extinct G. nesiotis. Formerly sometimes placed in Porphyriornis.
	Makira woodhen	Gallinula silvestris (Mayr, 1933)	Makira (the Solomon Islands), extremely rare with no direct observations in recent decades, but still considered likely extant due to reports of the species persisting in small numbers. Sometimes placed in Pareudiastes if that genus is considered valid or Edithornis.
	Samoan woodhen	Gallinula pacifica (Hartlaub & Finsch, 1871)	Samoa, possibly extinct (1907?). Sometimes placed in Pareudiastes if that genus is considered valid.

Species formerly included in the genus:

- Lesser moorhen Paragallinula angulata
- Black-tailed nativehen Tribonyx ventralis
- Tasmanian nativehen Tribonyx mortierii

Other moorhens have been described from older remains. Apart from the 1–2 extinctions in more recent times, another 1–4 species have become extinct as a consequence of early human settlement; a species close to the Samoan moorhen from Buka, the Solomon Islands, which is almost certainly distinct from the Makira moorhen, as the latter cannot fly. The undescribed Viti Levu gallinule of Fiji would either be separated in Pareudiastes if that genus is considered valid, or it may be a completely new genus. Similarly, the undescribed "swamphen" of Mangaia, currently tentatively assigned to Porphyrio, may belong to Gallinula or Pareudiastes if that genus is considered valid.

=== Evolution ===
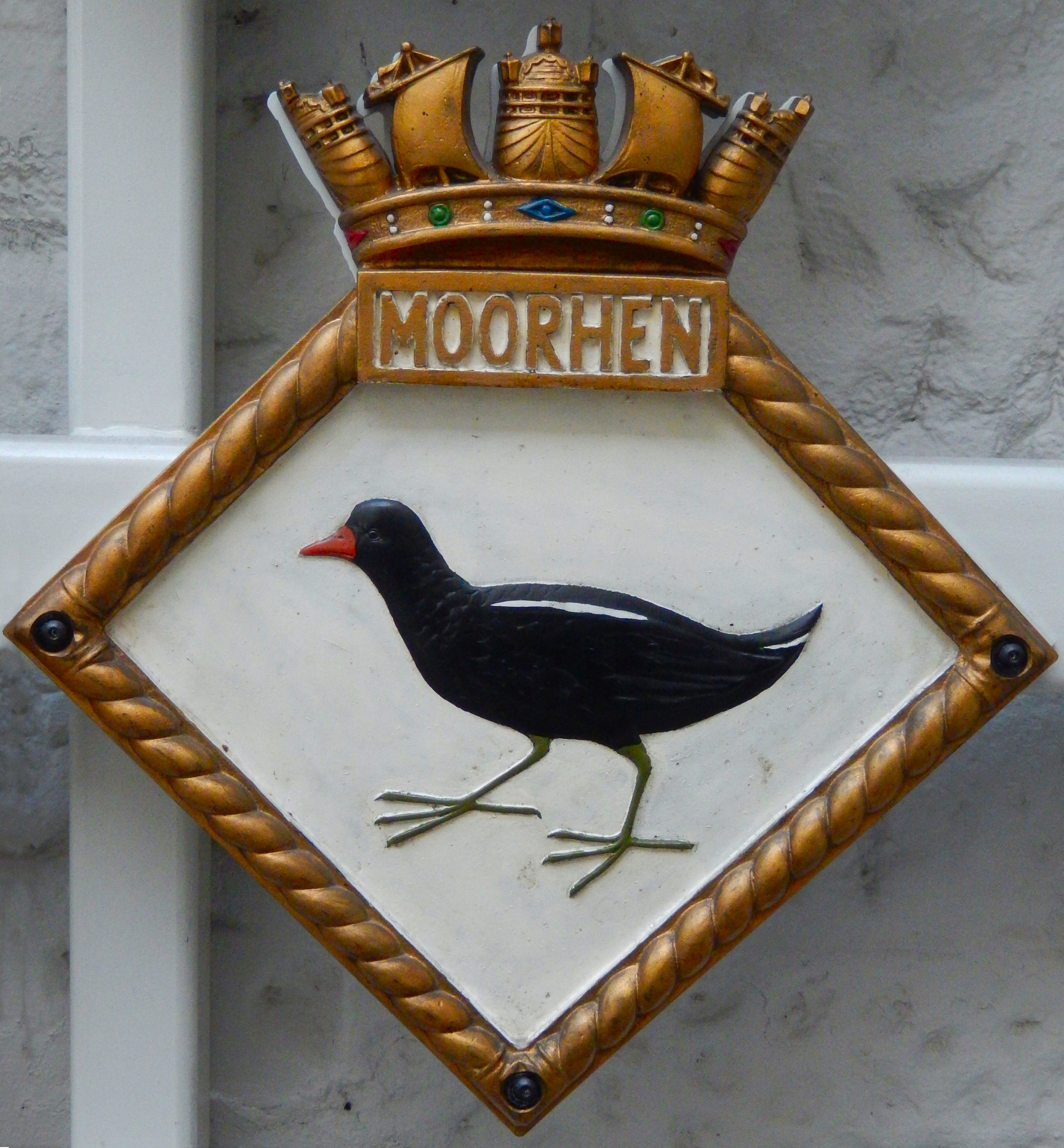
Badge of HMS Moorhen

Still older fossils document the genus since the Late Oligocene onwards. The genus seems to have originated in the Southern Hemisphere, in the general region of Australia. By the Pliocene, it was probably distributed worldwide:

- Gallinula sp. (Early Pliocene of Hungary and Germany)
- Gallinula kansarum (Late Pliocene of Kansas, USA)
- Gallinula balcanica (Late Pliocene of Varshets, Bulgaria).
- Gallinula gigantea (Early Pleistocene of the Czech Republic and Israel)

The ancient "Gallinula" disneyi (Late Oligocene—Early Miocene of Riversleigh, Australia) has been separated as genus Australlus.
