= Cockatrice (disambiguation) =

A cockatrice is a legendary creature resembling a large rooster with a lizard-like tail.

Cockatrice may also refer to:

- Cockatrice (Dungeons & Dragons), a small avian magical beast in the role-playing game Dungeons & Dragons
- HMS Cockatrice, eight ships of the Royal Navy
- Cockatrice, a British armoured vehicle mounting a Lagonda flamethrower

== See also ==
- Coquatrix, a French surname variant
- Cockentrice, a food
