= HMS Cockatrice =

Eight ships of the Royal Navy have been named HMS Cockatrice after the legendary creature:

- HMS Cockatrice (1781), launched in 1781, was a 14-gun cutter that sank at her moorings in 1801, was raised and then sold in 1802. Private interests purchased her, lengthened her (increasing her burthen from 181 to 195 tons), and changed her rig to that of a brig. They hired her out to the Navy and she was in service as a hired armed vessel from 1804 to 1808. She then returned to mercantile service sailing between England, Africa, and the Caribbean until she was condemned at Lisbon in 1816.
- Cockatrice was to have been the name for HMS Brev Drageren in 1812, but was never used.
- HMS Cockatrice (1832), launched in 1832, was a 6-gun schooner, sold in 1858.
- HMS Cockatrice (1860), launched in 1860, was a Britomart-class wooden screw gunboat, renamed YC 10 in 1882 and finally sold in 1885.
- HMS Cockatrice was originally a composite paddle vessel called HMS Niger, launched in 1880, renamed Cockatrice in 1881 and renamed again to HMS Moorhen in 1896. She was sold in 1899.
- HMS Cockatrice was originally a first class gunboat called HMS Bramble, launched in 1886, renamed Cockatrice in 1896 and sold in 1906.
- HMS Cockatrice was an ex-War Department vessel called Sir W. Harness, transferred and renamed Cockatrice in 1906, sold in 1910.
- HMS Cockatrice (1912), launched in 1912, was an Acasta-class destroyer, sold in 1921.
- HMS Cockatrice (J229), launched in 1942, was an Algerine-class minesweeper, sold in 1963 for breaking.
