= Coquatrix =

Coquatrix is a French surname variant of cockatrice. Notable people with the surname include:

- Bruno Coquatrix (1910–1979), French music producer
- Paulette Coquatrix (1916–2018), French costume designer

== See also ==
- Cockatrice (disambiguation)
