= List of birds of Wallis and Futuna =

Location of Wallis and Futuna in the South Pacific Ocean

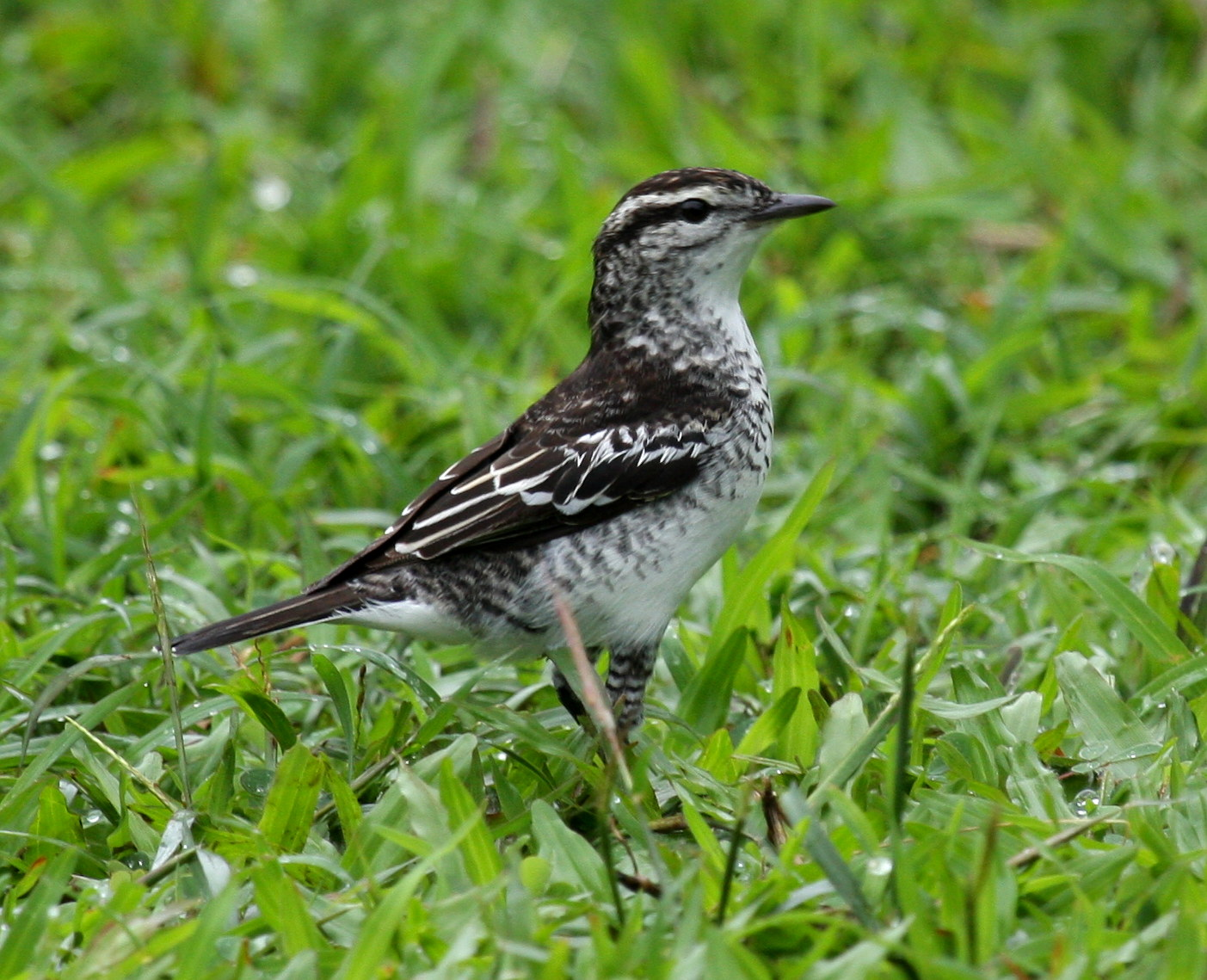
A subspecies of the Polynesian triller (adult from Fiji pictured) is endemic to Wallis and Futuna.

Wallis and Futuna is a French overseas collectivity in Polynesia in the Pacific Ocean. It consists of three main islands, Wallis (Uvea), Futuna, and Alofi, along with several offshore islets. These islands have a total land area of 145 km^{2} (56 sq mi) and are outside the three main archipelagoes in Western Polynesia: Fiji, Samoa, and Tonga. There are 62 species of birds that have been recorded from Wallis and Futuna, out of which five have been introduced by humans. No species are endemic to the collectivity, but there are endemic subspecies of the collared kingfisher, Polynesian triller, Fiji shrikebill, and Polynesian starling. The shy ground dove has been extirpated from the islands, while the blue-crowned lorikeet is locally extinct on Uvea. A now-extinct imperial pigeon, Ducula david, was described from subfossil remains on the islands and is thought to have been widespread before the arrival of humans.

Uvea is an eroded volcanic island and the largest of the three, while Futuna and Alofi are composite islands made of volcanic rock and limestone. The latter two islands are only 1.7 km (1.1 mi) from each other, but over 230 km (140 mi) southwest of Uvea. The main vegetation types found in Wallis and Futuna are wetlands such as mangroves and swamp forests, coastal strand vegetation, coastal forests, littoral forests, lowland rainforests, montane rainforests and cloud forests, and human-altered vegetation like secondary forests and cultivation. Threats to the avifauna of the islands include deforestation caused by agriculture, introduced species, especially rats, and hunting.

This list's taxonomic treatment (designation and sequence of orders, families and species) and nomenclature (common and scientific names) follow the conventions of the 2022 edition of The Clements Checklist of Birds of the World. The family accounts at the beginning of each heading reflect this taxonomy, as do the species counts found in each family account. The following tags have been used to highlight several categories. Species without any of these tags are native and commonly occurring.

- (A) Accidental – a species that rarely or accidentally occurs in Wallis and Futuna
- (I) Introduced – a species introduced to Wallis and Futuna as a consequence, direct or indirect, of human actions
- (Ex) Extirpated – a species that no longer occurs in Wallis and Futuna although populations may exist elsewhere

== Ducks, geese, and waterfowl ==
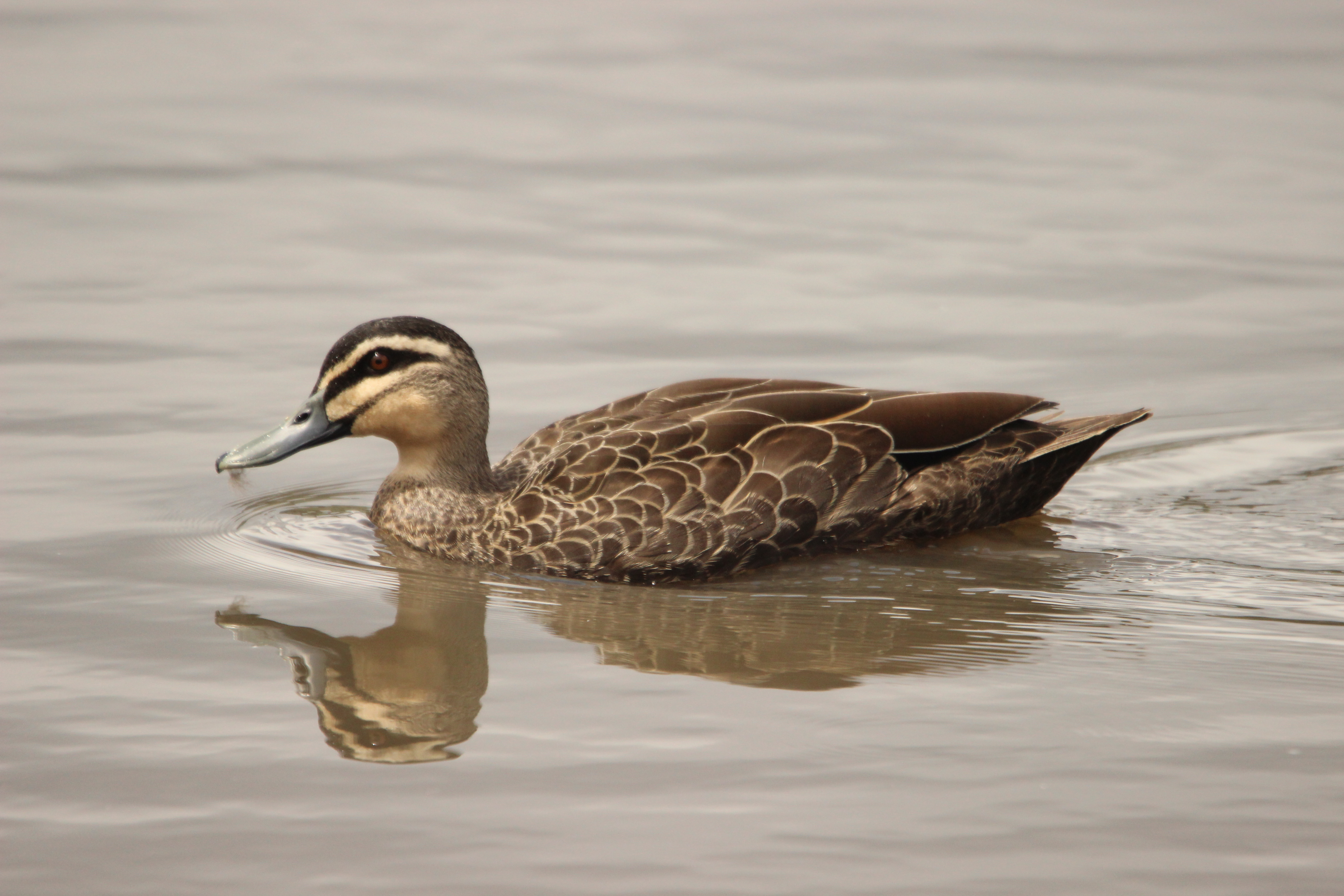
Pacific black duck

Order: Anseriformes Family: Anatidae

Anatidae includes the ducks and most duck-like waterfowl, such as geese and swans. These birds are adapted to an aquatic existence with webbed feet, flattened bills, and feathers that are excellent at shedding water due to an oily coating.

- Pacific black duck, Anas superciliosa

== Megapodes ==
Order: Galliformes Family: Megapodiidae

The megapodes are chicken-like with large feet and unique mound or burrow nests, in which they use heat generated by the environment to incubate their eggs. All but the malleefowl occupy jungle habitats.

- Melanesian scrubfowl, Megapodius eremita (A)

== Pheasants, grouse, and allies ==
Order: Galliformes Family: Phasianidae

The Phasianidae are a family of terrestrial birds comprising quails, partridges, snowcocks, francolins, spurfowls, tragopans, monals, pheasants, peafowls, grouse, ptarmigans, and junglefowls. In general, they are plump (although they vary in size) and have broad, relatively short wings.

- Red junglefowl, Gallus gallus (I)

== Pigeons and doves ==
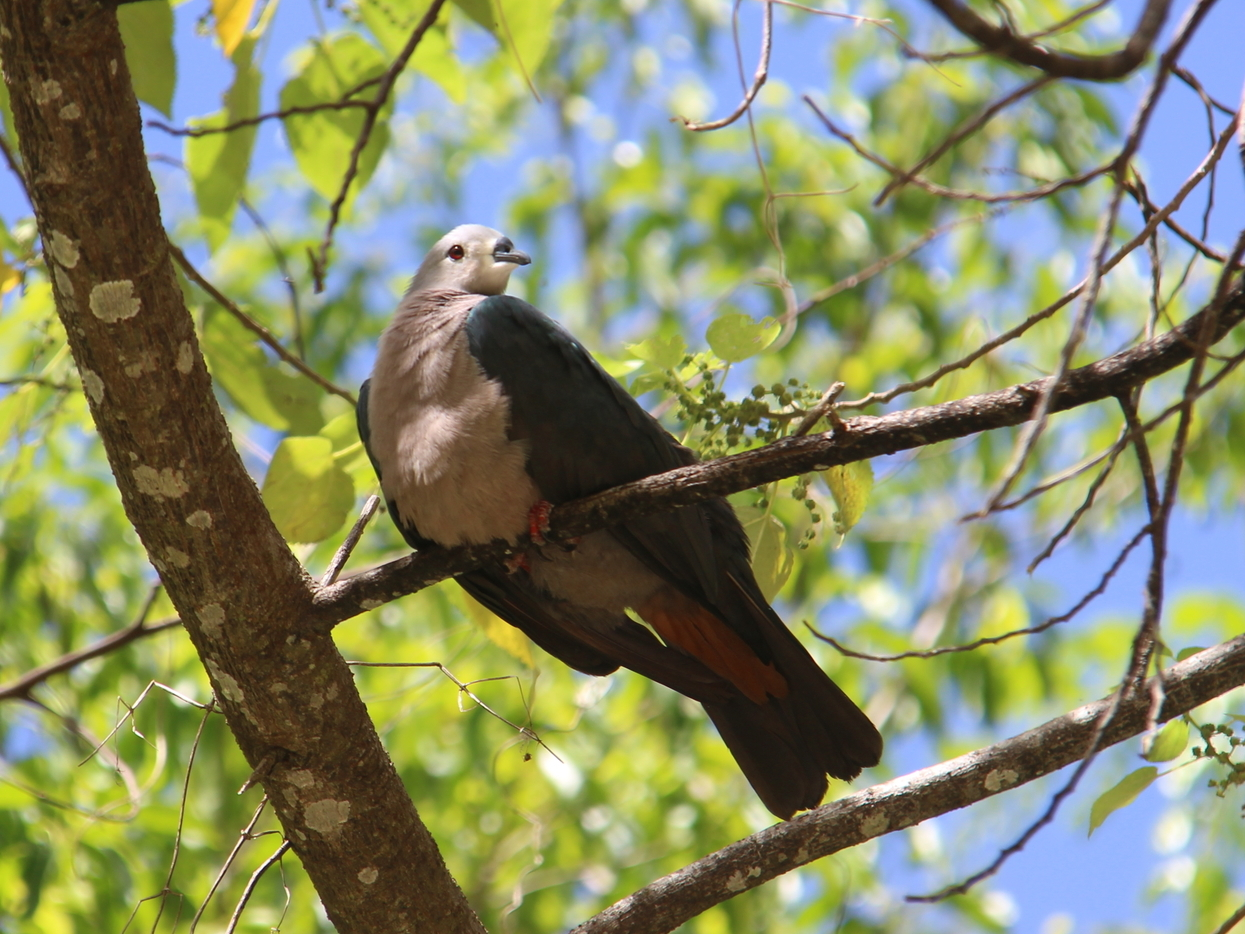
Pacific imperial-pigeon

Order: Columbiformes Family: Columbidae

Pigeons and doves are stout-bodied birds with short necks and short slender bills with a fleshy cere.

- Rock pigeon, Columba livia (I)
- Shy ground dove, Alopecoenas stairi (Ex)
- Crimson-crowned fruit-dove, Ptilinopus porphyraceus
- Pacific imperial-pigeon, Ducula pacifica

== Cuckoos ==
Order: Cuculiformes Family: Cuculidae

The family Cuculidae includes cuckoos, roadrunners and anis. These birds are of variable size with slender bodies, long tails and strong legs.

- Long-tailed koel, Eudynamys taitensis (A)

== Swifts ==
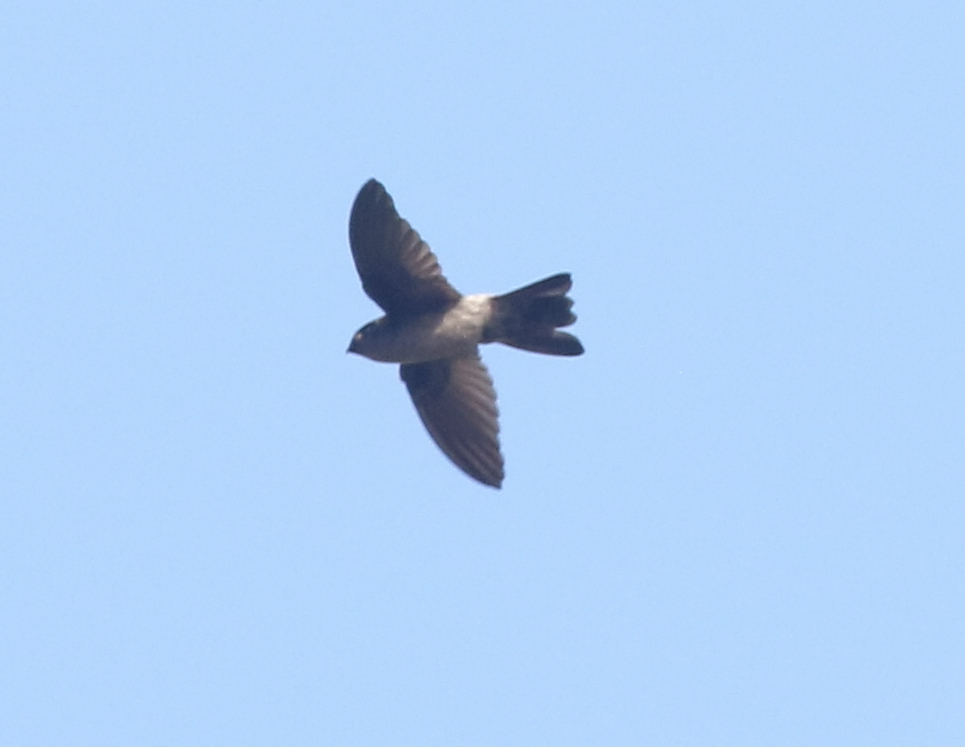
Australian swiftlet

Order: Apodiformes Family: Apodidae

Swifts are small birds which spend the majority of their lives flying. They are highly adapted to an aerial life and some are unable to take off from level ground.

- White-rumped swiftlet, Aerodramus spodiopygius
- Australian swiftlet, Aerodramus terraereginae

== Rails, gallinules, and coots ==
Order: Gruiformes Family: Rallidae

Rallidae is a large family of small to medium-sized birds which includes the rails, crakes, coots and gallinules. Typically they inhabit dense vegetation in damp environments near lakes, swamps or rivers. In general they are shy and secretive birds, making them difficult to observe. Most species have strong legs and long toes which are well adapted to soft uneven surfaces. They tend to have short, rounded wings and to be weak fliers.

- Buff-banded rail, Gallirallus philippensis
- Black-backed swamphen, Porphyrio indicus
- Australasian swamphen, Porphyrio melanotus
- Spotless crake, Zapornia tabuensis

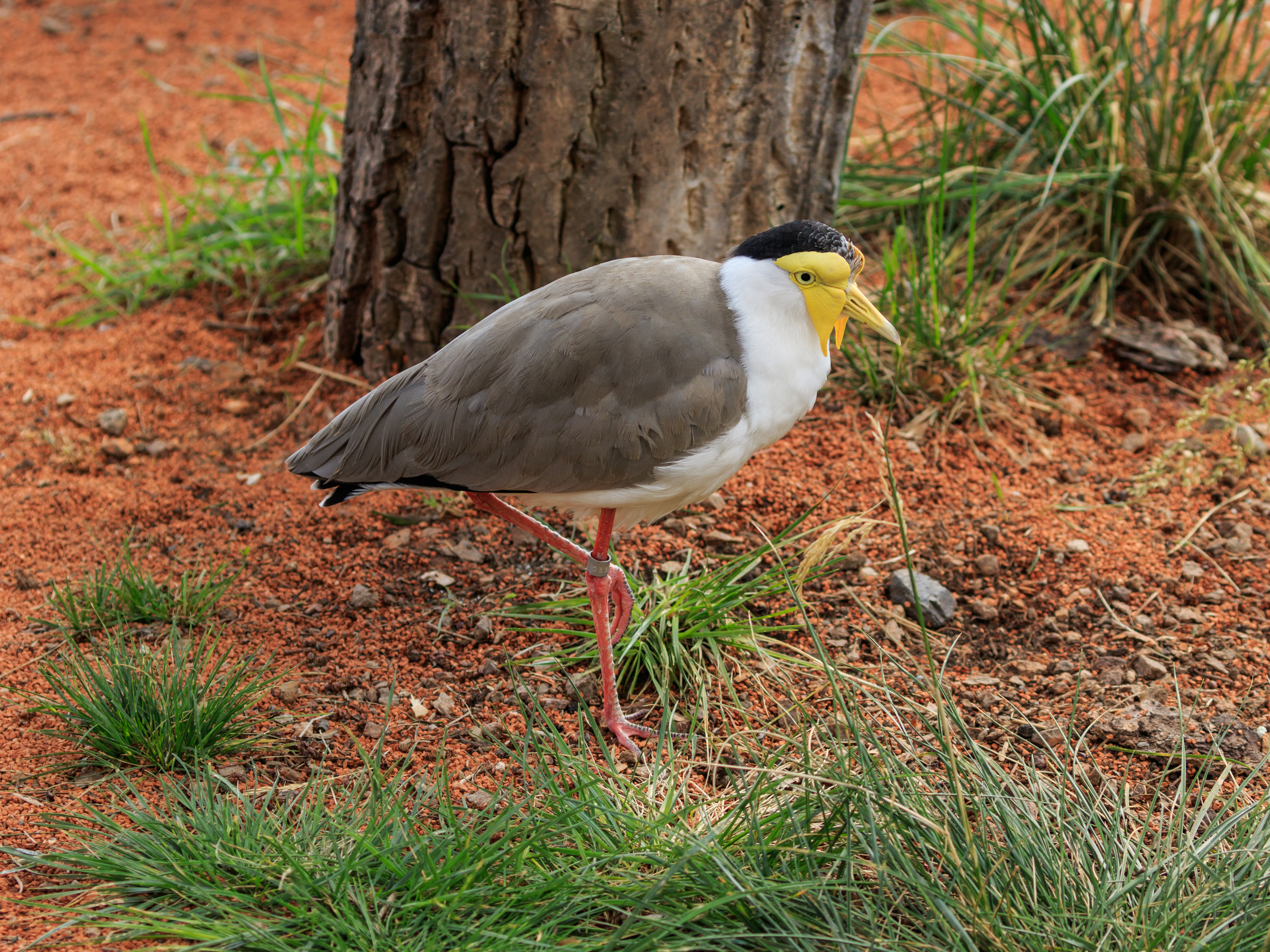
Masked lapwing

== Plovers and lapwings ==
Order: Charadriiformes Family: Charadriidae

The family Charadriidae includes the plovers, dotterels and lapwings. They are small to medium-sized birds with compact bodies, short, thick necks and long, usually pointed, wings. They are found in open country worldwide.

- Pacific golden-plover, Pluvialis fulva
- Masked lapwing, Vanellus miles (A)

== Sandpipers and allies ==
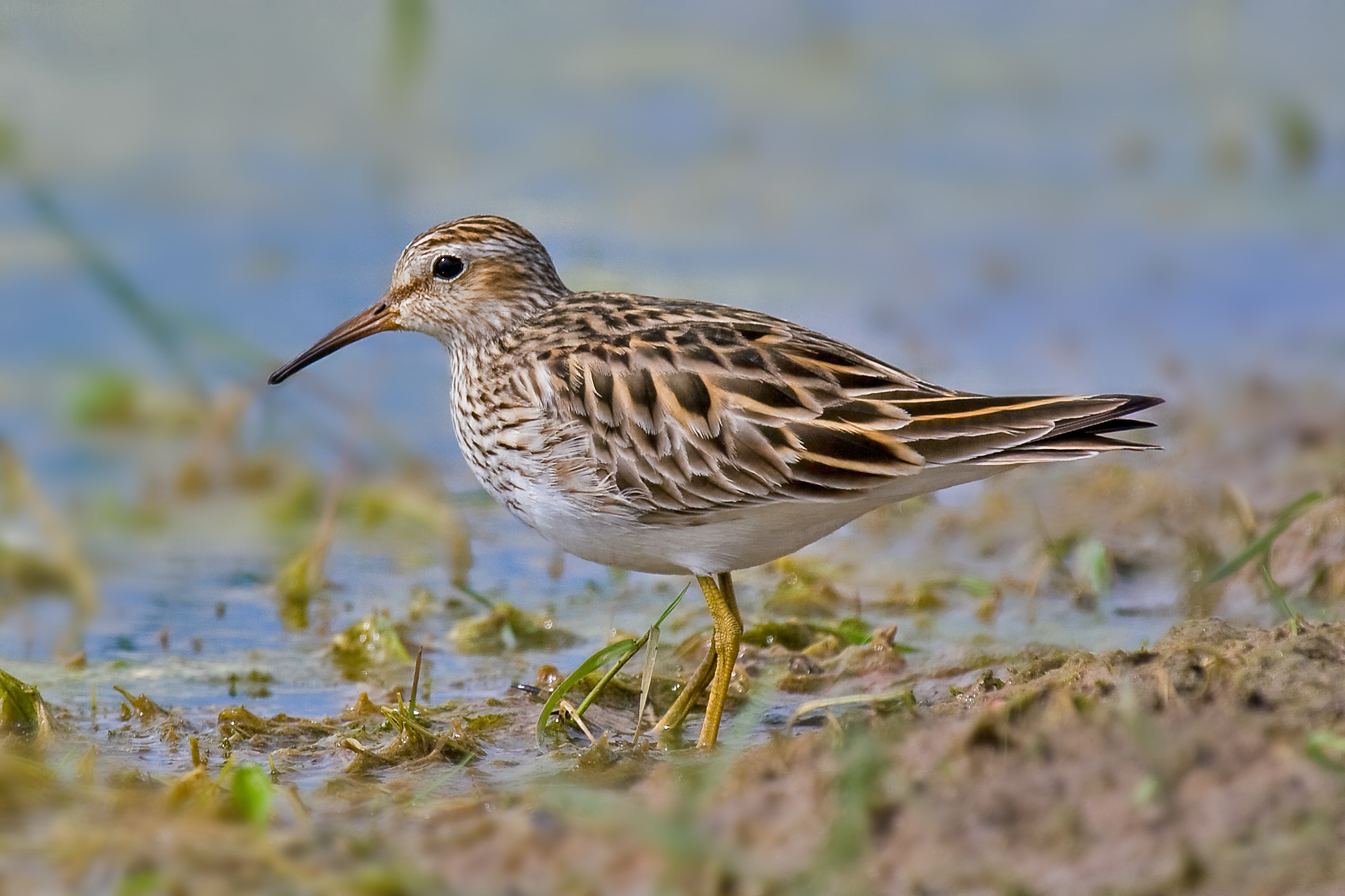
Pectoral sandpiper

Order: Charadriiformes Family: Scolopacidae

Scolopacidae is a large diverse family of small to medium-sized shorebirds including the sandpipers, curlews, godwits, shanks, tattlers, woodcocks, snipes, dowitchers and phalaropes. The majority of these species eat small invertebrates picked out of the mud or soil. Some species have highly specialised bills adapted to specific feeding strategies.

- Bristle-thighed curlew, Numenius tahitiensis
- Whimbrel, Numenius phaeopus
- Bar-tailed godwit, Limosa lapponica
- Ruddy turnstone, Arenaria interpres
- Pectoral sandpiper, Calidris melanotos (A)
- Wandering tattler, Tringa incana

== Gulls, terns, and skimmers ==
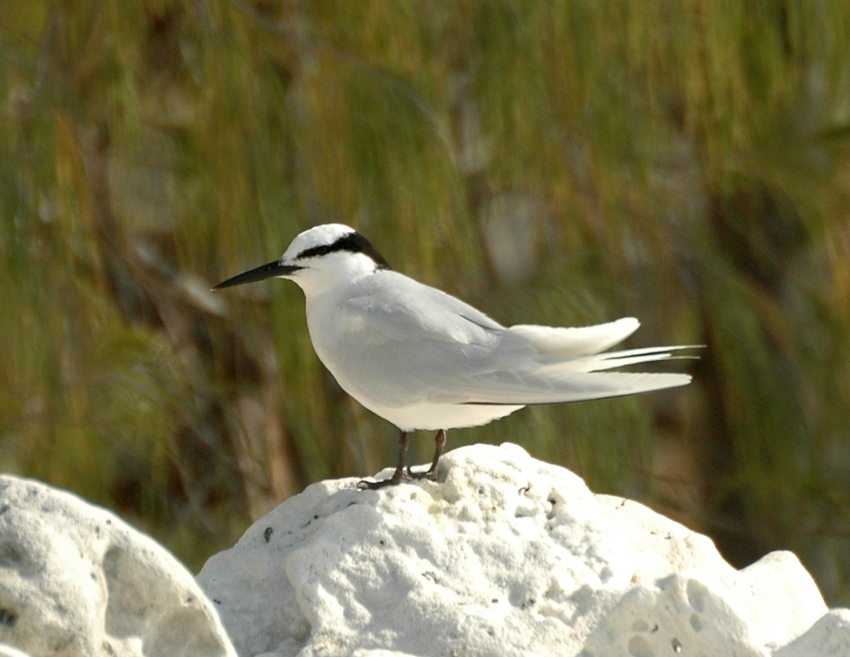
Black-naped tern

Order: Charadriiformes Family: Laridae

Laridae is a family of seabirds consisting of gulls, terns, and skimmers. Gulls are typically grey or white, often with black markings on the head or wings. Terns are generally smaller than gulls with more pointed wings and bills, many also having forked tails which help with aerial manoeuvrability. Both species can be found inland near lakes and rivers, however gulls have adapted well to human presence and can often be found in urban centers.

- Brown noddy, Anous stolidus
- Black noddy, Anous minutus
- White tern, Gygis alba
- Sooty tern, Onychoprion fuscatus
- Bridled tern, Onychoprion anaethetus
- Black-naped tern, Sterna sumatrana
- Great crested tern, Thalasseus bergii (A)

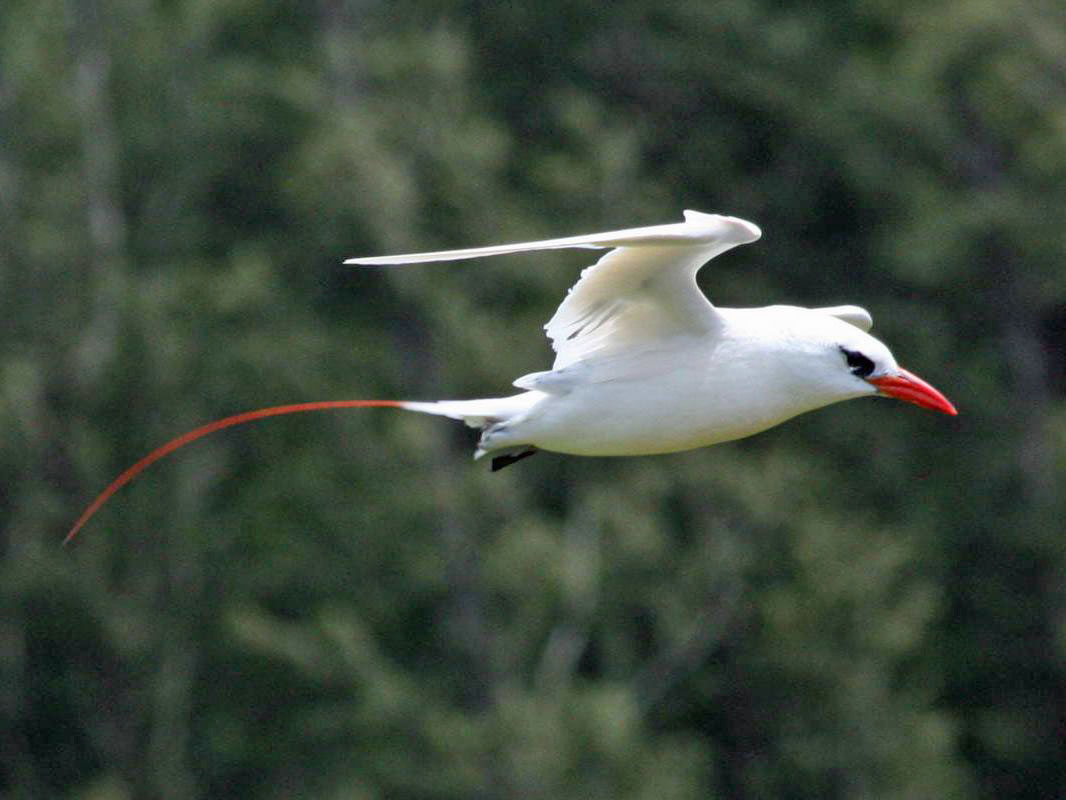
Red-tailed tropicbird

== Tropicbirds ==
Order: Phaethontiformes Family: Phaethontidae

Tropicbirds are slender white birds of tropical oceans, with exceptionally long central tail feathers. Their heads and long wings have black markings.

- White-tailed tropicbird, Phaethon lepturus
- Red-tailed tropicbird, Phaethon rubricauda

== Shearwaters and petrels ==
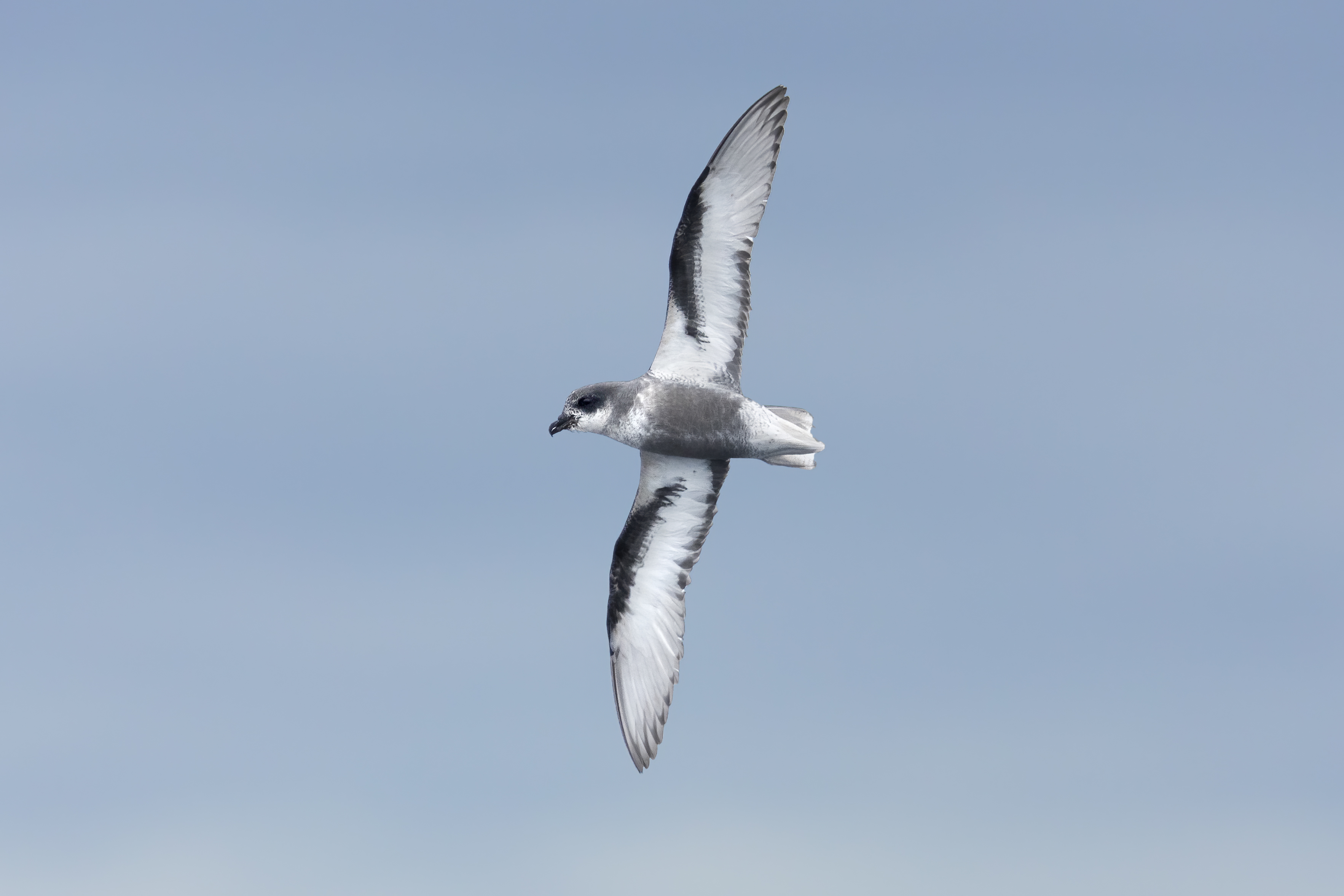
Mottled petrel

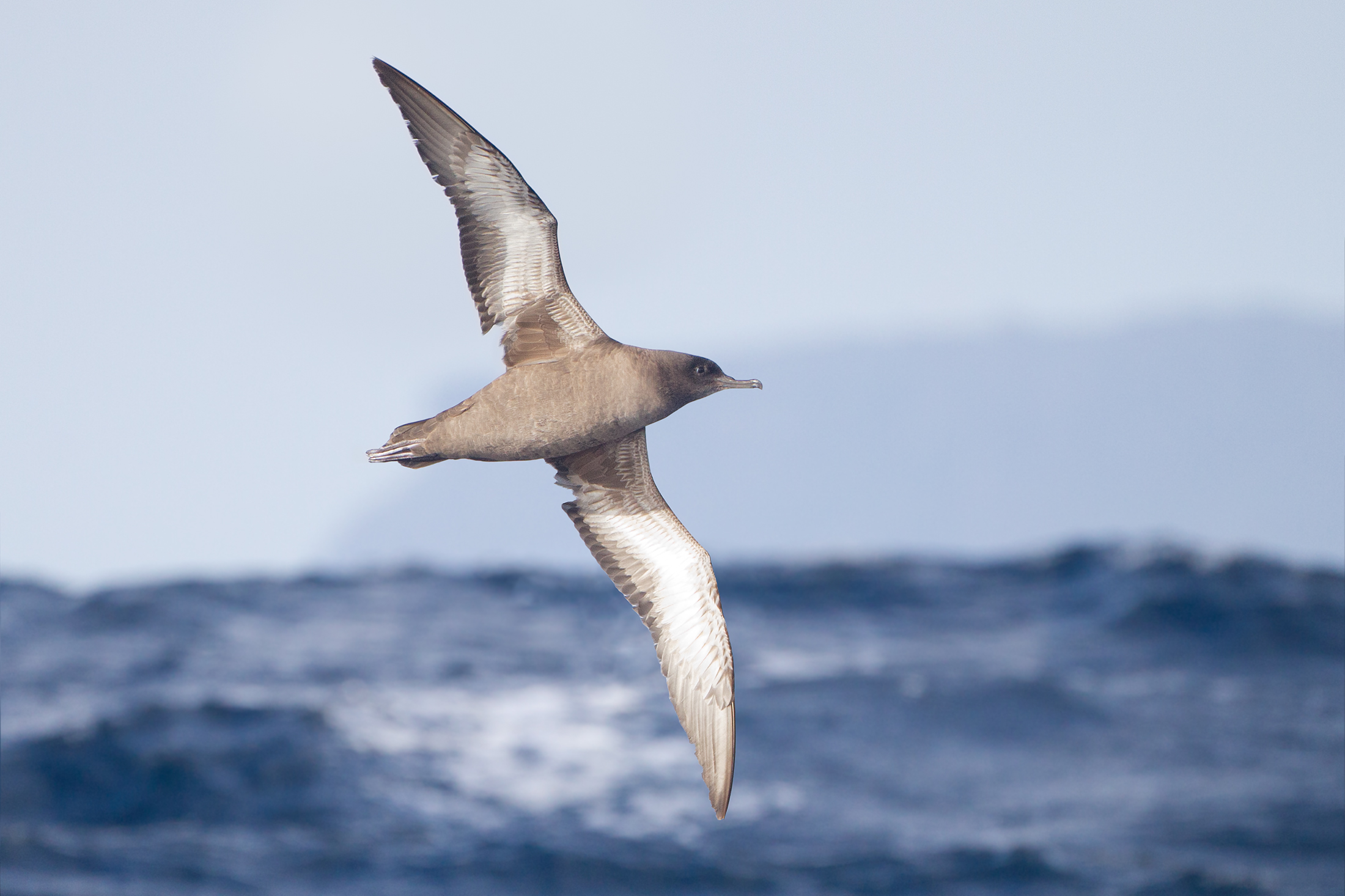
Sooty shearwater

Order: Procellariiformes Family: Procellariidae

The procellariids are a group of medium-sized petrels, characterised by united nostrils with a medium nasal septum and a long outer functional primary flight feather.

- Herald petrel, Pterodroma heraldica (A)
- Mottled petrel, Pterodroma inexpectata (A)
- Black-winged petrel, Pterodroma nigripennis
- Gould's petrel, Pterodroma leucoptera (A)
- Collared petrel, Pterodroma brevipes
- Tahiti petrel, Pseudobulweria rostrata (A)
- Wedge-tailed shearwater, Ardenna pacifica
- Buller's shearwater, Ardenna bulleri
- Sooty shearwater, Ardenna grisea
- Newell's shearwater, Puffinus newelli (A)
- Tropical shearwater, Puffinus bailloni

== Frigatebirds ==
Order: Suliformes Family: Fregatidae

Frigatebirds are large seabirds usually found over tropical oceans. They are large, black and white or completely black, with long wings and deeply forked tails. The males have coloured inflatable throat pouches. They do not swim or walk and cannot take off from a flat surface. They are essentially aerial, able to stay aloft for days at a time.

- Lesser frigatebird, Fregata ariel
- Great frigatebird, Fregata minor

== Boobies and gannets ==
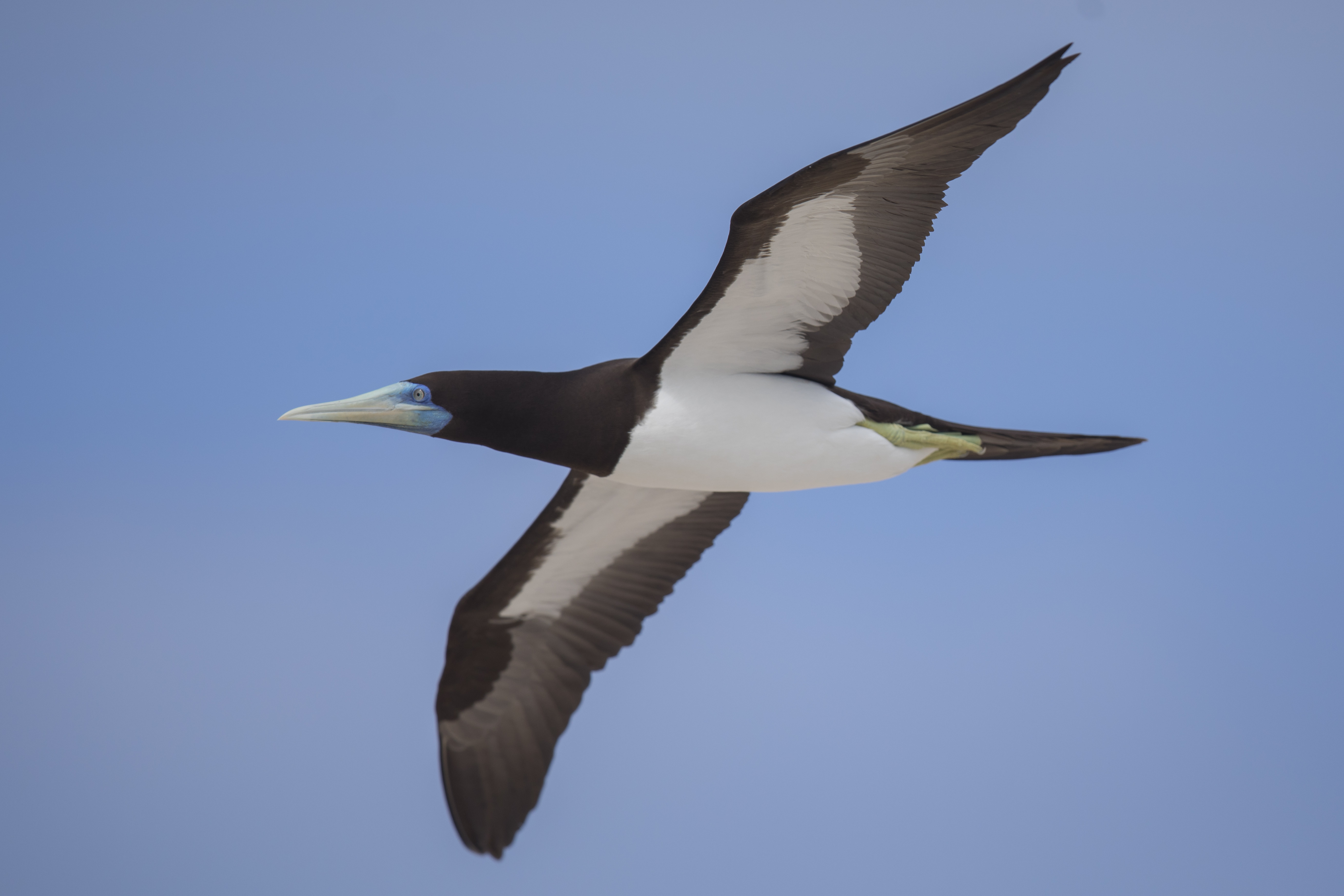
Brown booby in flight

Order: Suliformes Family: Sulidae

The sulids comprise the gannets and boobies. Both groups are medium to large coastal seabirds that plunge-dive for fish.

- Brown booby, Sula leucogaster
- Red-footed booby, Sula sula

== Herons, egrets, and bitterns ==
Order: Pelecaniformes Family: Ardeidae

The family Ardeidae contains the bitterns, herons, and egrets. Herons and egrets are medium to large wading birds with long necks and legs. Bitterns tend to be shorter necked and more wary. Members of Ardeidae fly with their necks retracted.

- White-faced heron, Egretta novaehollandiae (A)
- Pacific reef-heron, Egretta sacra

== Hawks, eagles, and kites ==
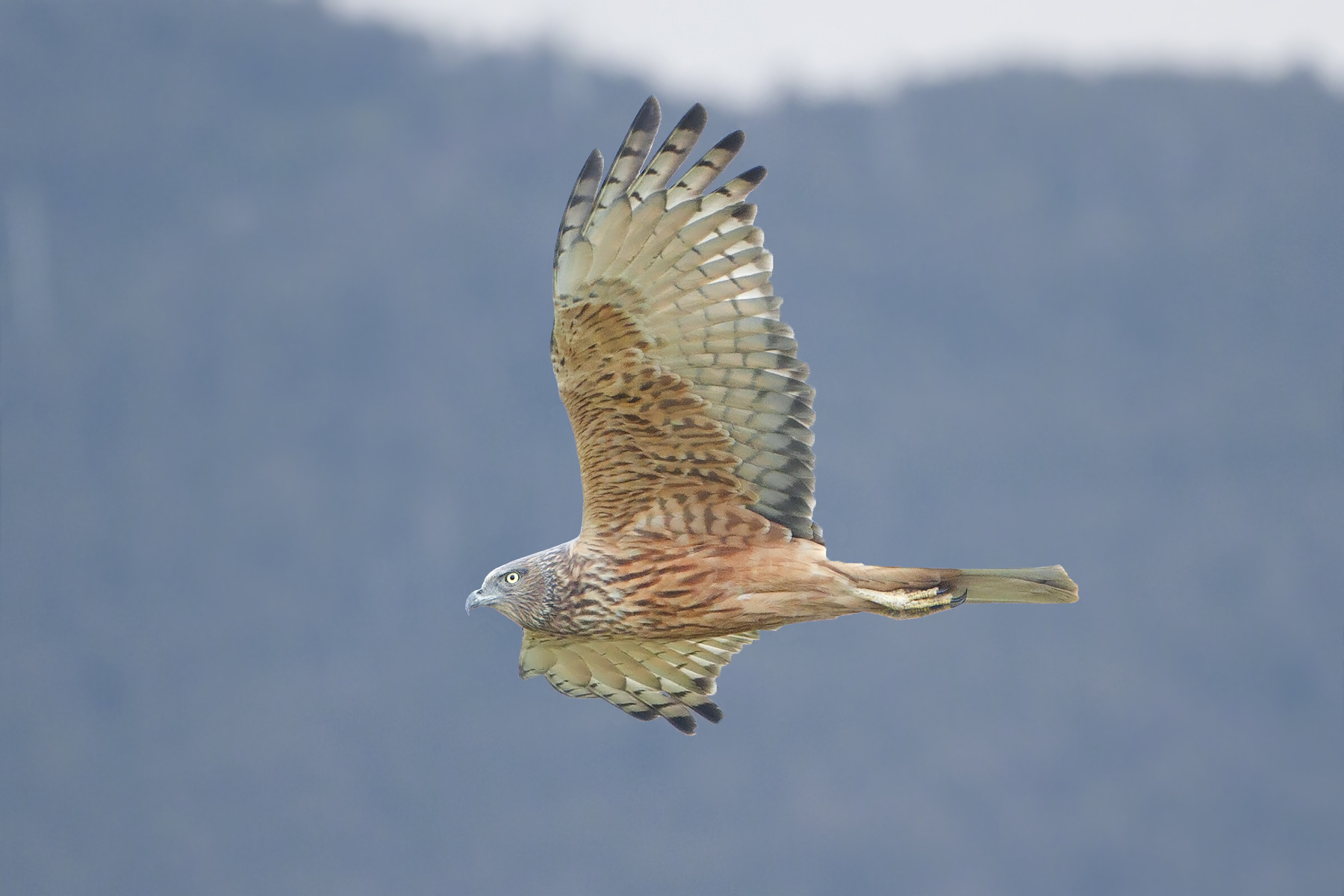
Adult male swamp harrier

Order: Accipitriformes Family: Accipitridae

Accipitridae is a family of birds of prey, which includes hawks, eagles, kites, harriers and Old World vultures. These birds have powerful hooked beaks and strong talons to hunt their typical prey of small vertebrates, although some species have other, highly specialized diets.

- Swamp harrier, Circus approximans (A)

== Barn-owls ==
Order: Strigiformes Family: Tytonidae

Barn-owls are long-legged and lightly built owls with characteristic heart-shaped faces.

- Eastern barn owl, Tyto javanica

== Kingfishers ==
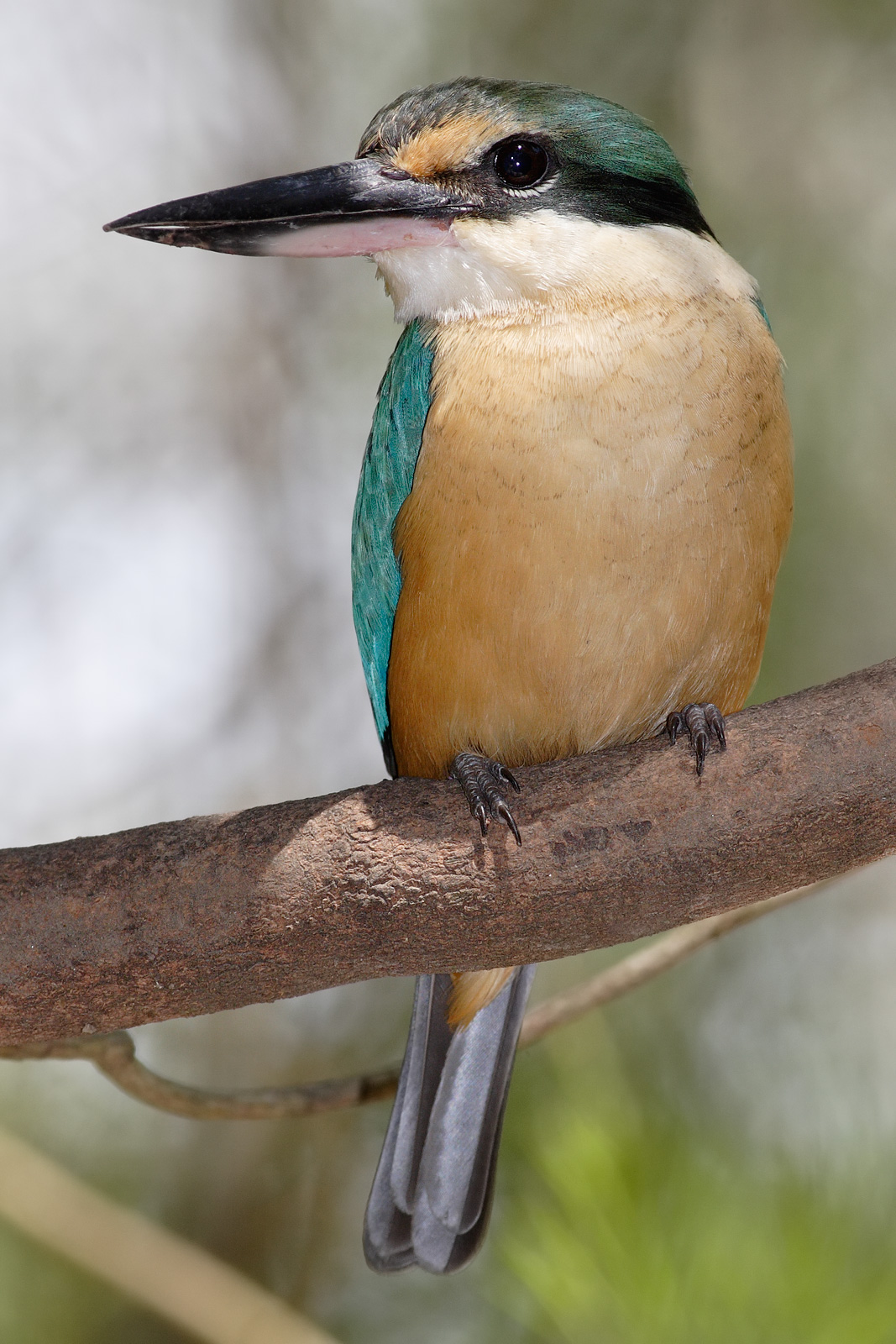
Sacred kingfisher

Order: Coraciiformes Family: Alcedinidae

Kingfishers are small to large birds with large bills and a carnivorous diet.

- Pacific kingfisher, Todirhamphus sacer
- Sacred kingfisher, Todirhamphus sanctus
- Collared kingfisher, Todirhamphus chloris

== Falcons and caracaras ==
Order: Falconiformes Family: Falconidae

Falconidae is a family of diurnal birds of prey. They feed on a variety of prey and generally inhabit open country, although some live in forests.

- Aplomado falcon, Falco femoralis (A)

== Old World parrots ==
Order: Psittaciformes Family: Psittaculidae

Old World parrots are brightly coloured birds with strong, hooked beaks and zygodactyl feet. They are found in a variety of habitats and mostly eat fruit and seeds.

- Blue-crowned lorikeet, Vini australis

== Honeyeaters ==
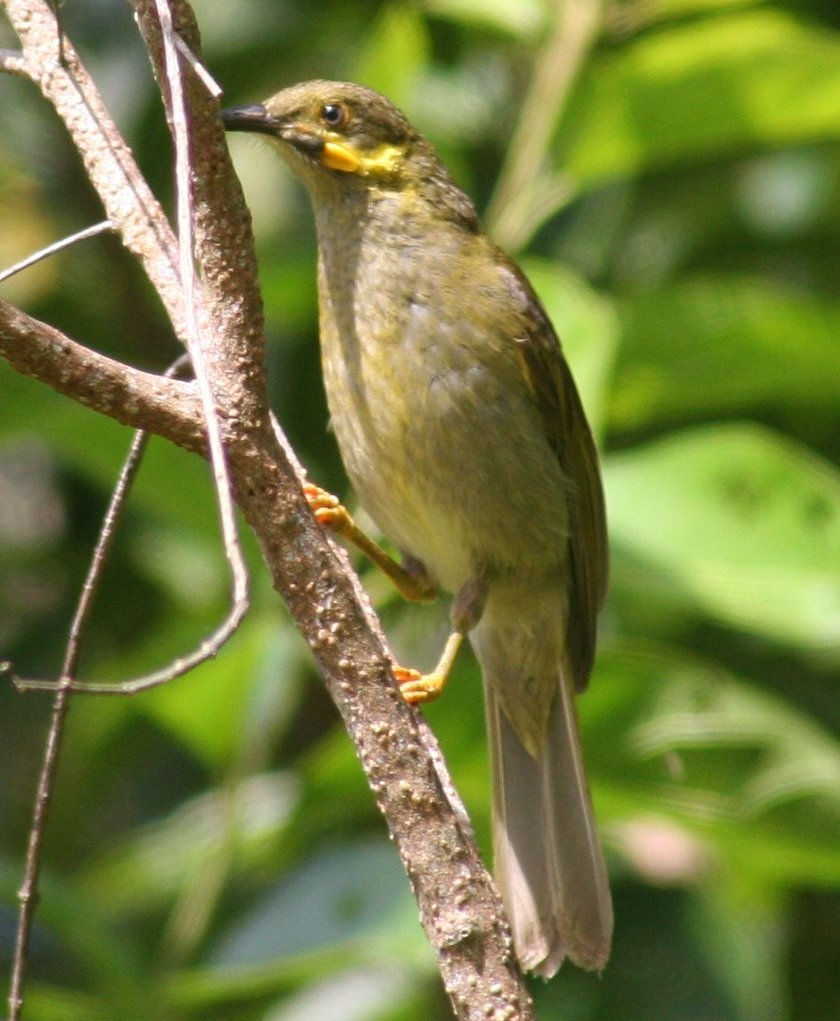
Eastern wattled honeyeater

Order: Passeriformes Family: Meliphagidae

The honeyeaters are a large and diverse family of birds most common in Australia and New Guinea. They are nectar feeders and inhabit a range of habitats with flowering plants.

- Eastern wattled honeyeater, Foulehaio carunculatus

== Cuckooshrikes ==
Order: Passeriformes Family: Campephagidae

The cuckooshrikes are mostly insectivorous passerines found in Asia, Africa, and Australia.

- Polynesian triller, Lalage maculosa

== Monarch flycatchers ==
Order: Passeriformes Family: Monarchidae

The monarch flycatchers are medium-sized insectivorous flycatchers which hunt by sallying.

- Fiji shrikebill, Clytorhynchus vitiensis

== Starlings ==
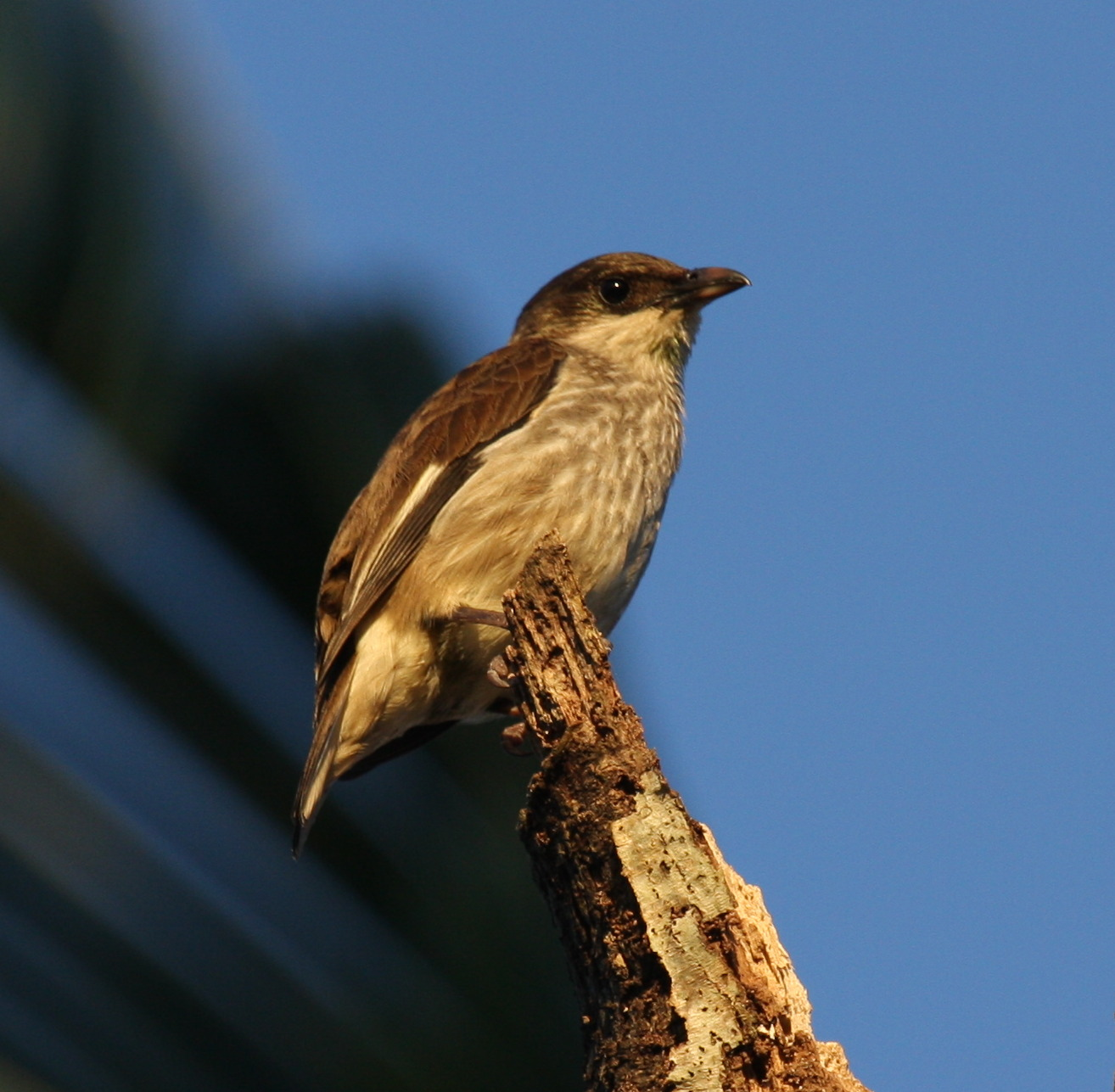
Polynesian starling

Order: Passeriformes Family: Sturnidae

Starlings are passerine birds that live in a variety of habitats in Asia and Africa. They are generally dark-colored, but some species have bold, bright, iridescent plumage.

- Polynesian starling, Aplonis tabuensis
- Common myna, Acridotheres tristis (I)
- Jungle myna, Acridotheres fuscus (I)

== Waxbills and allies ==
Order: Passeriformes Family: Estrildidae

The estrildid finches are small passerine birds of the Old World tropics and Australasia. They are gregarious and often colonial seed eaters with short and thick, but pointed, bills. They are all similar in structure and habits, but have wide variation in plumage colours and patterns.

- Chestnut-breasted munia, Lonchura castaneothorax (I)

== See also ==
- List of birds
- Lists of birds by region
