= Flag of Wallis and Futuna =

French overseas collectivity flag

Wallis and Futuna
- Flag of France and the Territory of the Wallis and Futuna Islands
- Tricolore
- Use: National flag, civil and state ensign
- Proportion: 2:3
- Adopted: 15 February 1794
- Design: A vertical tricolour of blue, white, and red.
- Uvéa Flag
- Unofficial flag of the Territory of the Wallis and Futuna Islands
- Use: Unofficial flag
- Proportion: 2:3
- Adopted: 1985
- Design: A red saltire on a white square, which in turn is placed on a red field. The cross is shifted a little off centre toward the fly. The cross pattée is also shifted slightly downwards. The flag of France, outlined in white on two sides, is in the upper hoist quadrant.

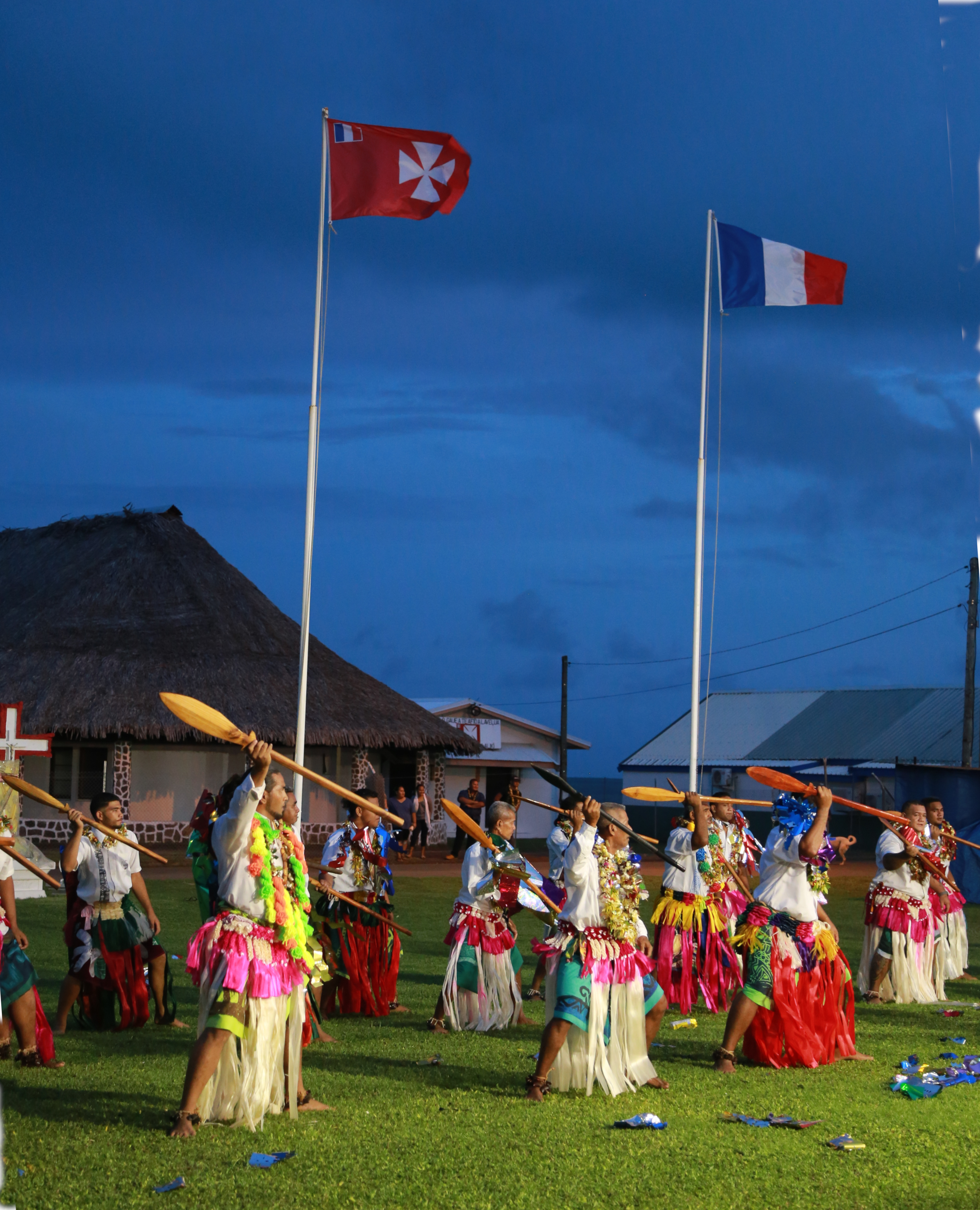
Flags at the 2019 Fête du Territoire.

The official flag of Wallis and Futuna is the French national flag, as it is a French territory. Wallis and Futuna has a locally used unofficial flag which bears the French flag in the canton.

== History ==
The flag of Wallis and Futuna was created in 1842, five years after the arrival of French settlers and missionaries. It was created by Bishop Pierre Bataillon, initially as a white flag with crosses in the corners and inspired by the coat of arms of the Marist Brothers and was approved by King Soane-Patita Vaimua Lavelua of Uvea. In the late 19th century, it was changed to be based on a new red Marist banner with a white cross pattée and in 1910, the flag of France was added in canton to recognise its status as a French protectorate. It was subsequently amended to replace the cross with four white triangles representing the French Administrator Superior of Wallis and Futuna and the three traditional kings of Uvea, Alo and Singave. Though the original one with the cross is still used.

== Description ==
The unofficial flag of Wallis and Futuna features a red saltire on a white square, which in turn is placed on a red field (alternatively, a larger white cross pattée is used). The cross is shifted a little off centre toward the fly (outer edge). The cross pattée is also shifted slightly downwards. The flag of France, outlined in white on two sides, is in the upper hoist quadrant. This flag is used to represent Wallis and Futuna at events such as the Pacific Games.

For official occasions, the French flag is used. Both flags do fly together. In sporting events, the flag of Wallis and Futuna is used to represent the territory. It is often flown by the Wallis and Futunian diaspora in Mainland France as a symbol of culture.

== Subdivision flags ==
The three official chiefdoms of Wallis and Futuna have their own separate flags:

Alo

Sigave

Uvea

== Historical flags ==
Kingdom of Uvea (1842–1860)

Kingdom of Uvea (1860–1886)

Kingdom of Uvea (1886–1887)

Royal Standard of Uvea (1837–1858)

Royal Standard of Uvea (1858–1887)

Unofficial flag of Wallis and Futuna (1887–1910)

Unofficial flag of Wallis and Futuna (1910–1976)

Unofficial flag of Wallis and Futuna (1976–1985)

Unofficial flag of Wallis and Futuna (1985–2020)

== Flag variants ==
Flag of France and the Territory of Wallis and Futuna

Unofficial flag of Wallis and Futuna

Unofficial flag of Wallis and Futuna used de facto, especially in sporting events.

Unofficial flag of Wallis and Futuna used de facto, at events such as the Pacific Games.

=== Historical flag variants ===
Unofficial flag of Wallis and Futuna, from the 1983 edition of the Grand Dictionnaire Encyclopédique Larousse.(1983–1985)

Unofficial flag of Wallis and Futuna used de facto, especially in sporting events.(1985-2020)

Unofficial flag of Wallis and Futuna used de facto, at events such as the Pacific Games.(1985-2020)

== See also ==
- Flag of France
- Coat of arms of Wallis and Futuna
- Flags of New Caledonia
