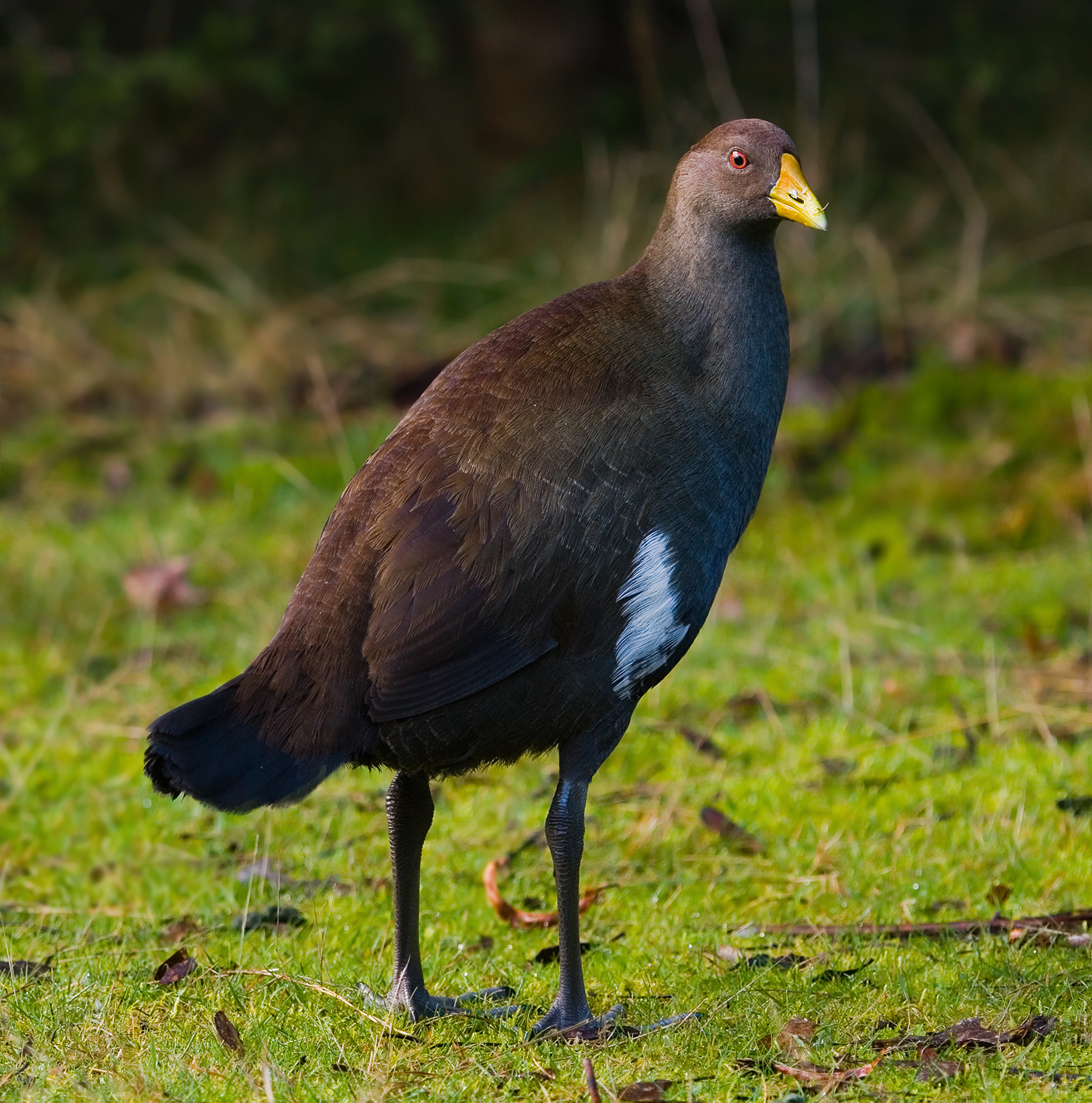
- male
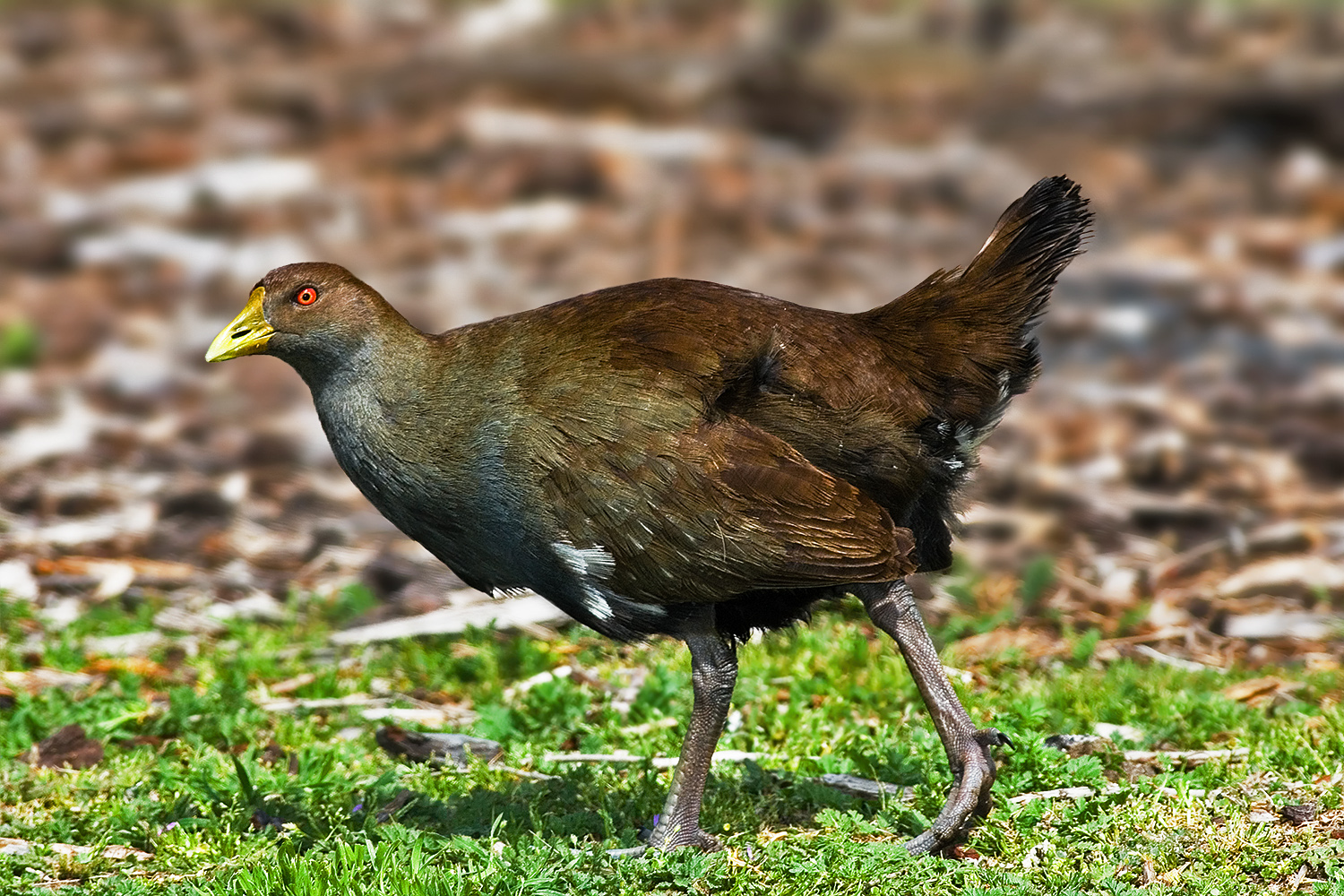
- female

Conservation status
- Least Concern (IUCN 3.1)

Scientific classification
- Kingdom: Animalia
- Phylum: Chordata
- Class: Aves
- Order: Gruiformes
- Family: Rallidae
- Genus: Tribonyx
- Species: T. mortierii

Binomial name
- Tribonyx mortierii Du Bus de Gisignies, 1840
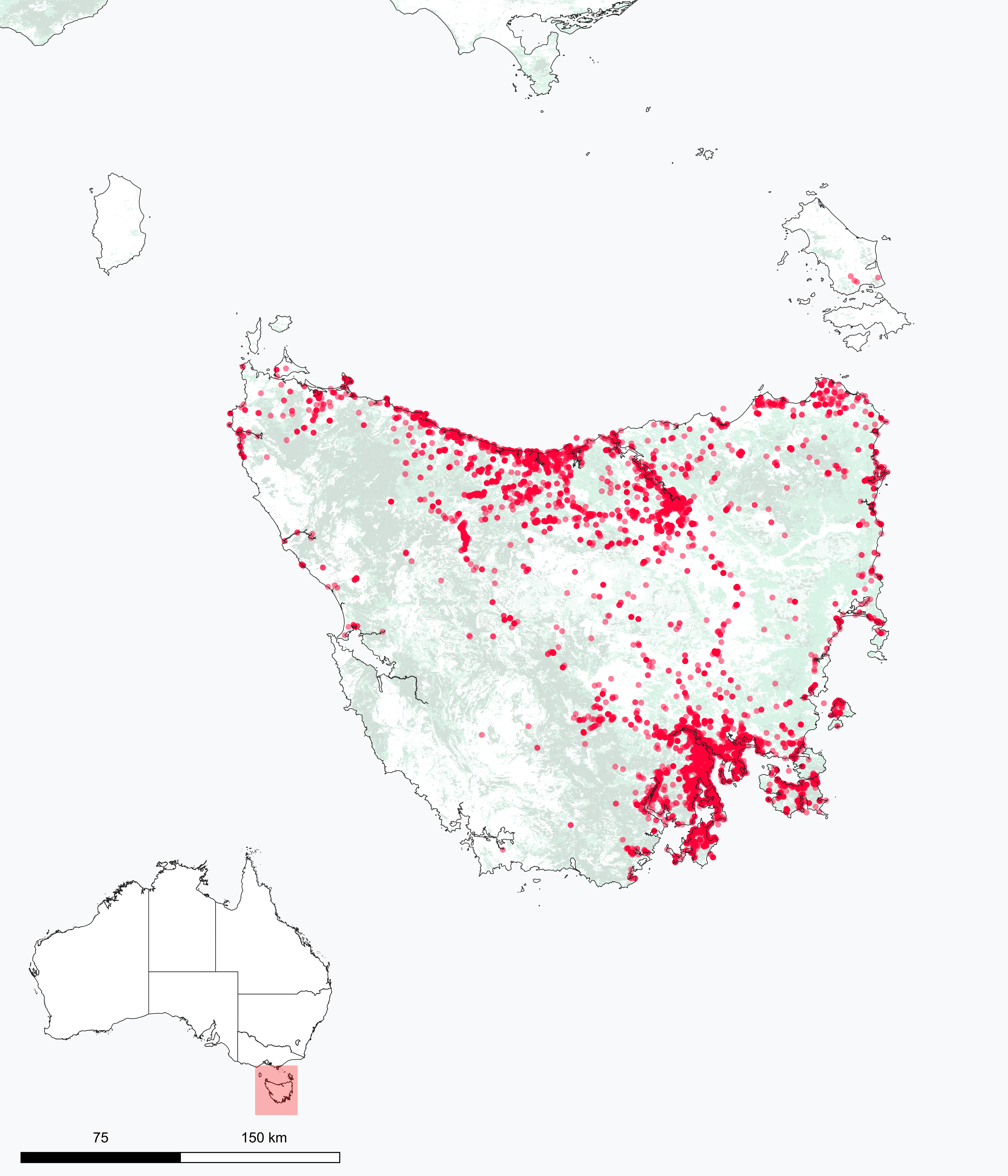

Synonyms
- Gallinula mortierii

= Tasmanian nativehen =

Species of bird

The Tasmanian nativehen (Tribonyx mortierii) (alternative spellings: Tasmanian native-hen or Tasmanian native hen), also known by its palawa kani name piyura, is a flightless rail and one of twelve species of birds endemic to Australia's island state of Tasmania. Although many flightless birds have a history of extinction at the hands of humans, the species has actually benefited from the introduction of European-style agricultural practices in Tasmania. Its success may also be attributed to the recent extinction of its main predator, the thylacine.

== Nomenclature ==
The species was originally described in 1840 as Tribonyx mortierii — the mortierii being in honour of Belgian botanist Barthélemy Charles Joseph Dumortier. The palawa kani name for the Tasmanian nativehen is piyura, from the Swanport/Oyster Bay language region. Local nicknames include narkie, waterhen and turbo chook, despite the species being in the Rallidae family and not being related to junglefowl or the domestic chicken.

== Description ==
The Tasmanian nativehen is a stocky flightless bird between 43 and 51 centimetres (17 and 20 in) in length. The upperparts are olive-brown with a white patch on the flank. The underparts are darker with a bluish-grey tinge. The short tail is close to black and mostly held erect. The legs are thick and powerful, with a grey scaly appearance and sharp claws. The eyes are bright red. The bill has a small greenish-yellow frontal shield.

The juvenile bird is similar in appearance to the adult, though the colours are more subdued on the body and the underparts have fine white spots. The bill is greenish-yellow and the eyes bright red. Male birds generally have longer bills and legs, though there is enough overlap that the sexes are indistinguishable, even in the hand.

=== Voice ===
The species has 14 separate calls, ranging from low grunts to high pitched alarm calls as well as a see-sawing duet performed in unison, rising to a crescendo of harsh screeching notes, It also calls at night.

== Distribution and habitat ==
The species is endemic to, and widespread in, Tasmania apart from the west and south-west regions. It is sedentary, living around open grassy areas close to water. It is not found on King or Flinders Island in the Bass Strait, though Michael Sharland does record it as being on Flinders Island. A population introduced to Maria Island is now well established. It is generally common and easily seen around bodies of water that have grassy verges.

Fossil records indicate that it was found on the Australian mainland until around 4,700 years ago. Suggested reasons for its extirpation have included human overhunting, the introduction of the dingo, or an extremely dry period.

== Behaviour and social organisation ==
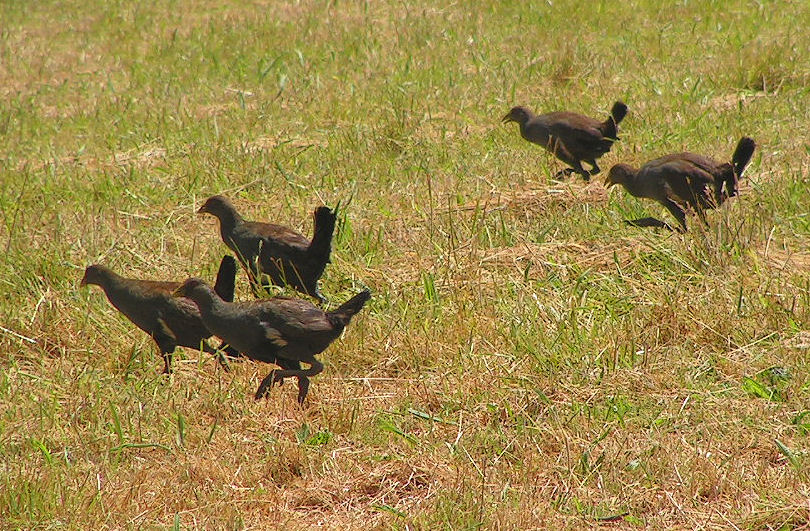
Flock on the run, Bruny Island

The nativehen's social organisation has been extensively studied. They live in groups of between two and five, plus the young birds from the previous breeding season, which tend to stay with the group and contribute to the care of the young until they move off to establish their own territories after approximately one year. The sedentary nature of the species means that groups hold sharply defined territories of up to 5 acres (2.0 ha), and repel transgression into their territory vigorously with calls and displays. Fights can also occur, where birds will jump, peck and kick at each other violently, sometimes drawing blood and pulling feathers.

Although flightless, the bird is capable of running quickly and has been recorded running at speeds up to 35 kilometres per hour (22 mph). It uses its wings when running fast to help it to balance.

=== Breeding ===
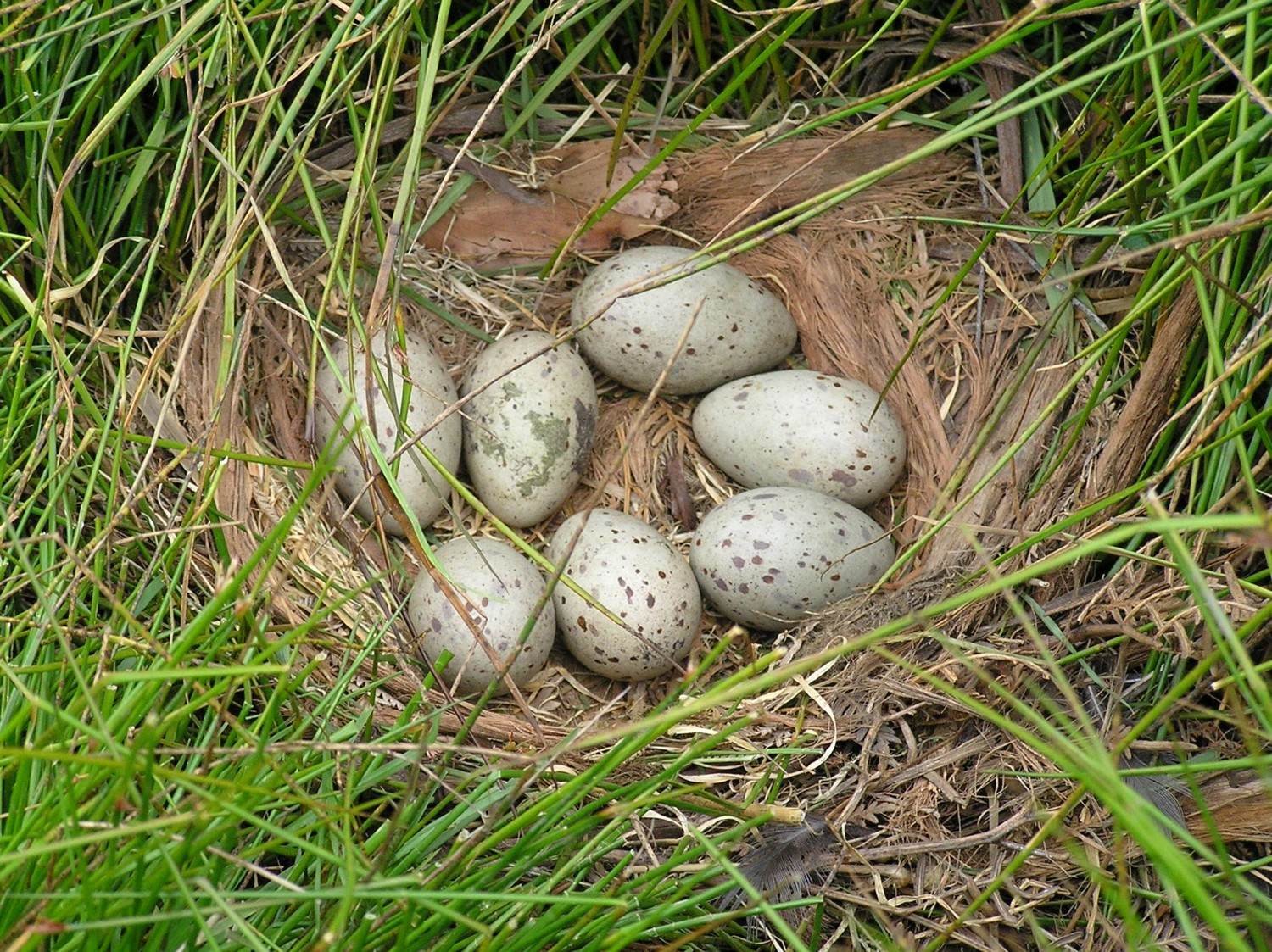
Nest with eggs

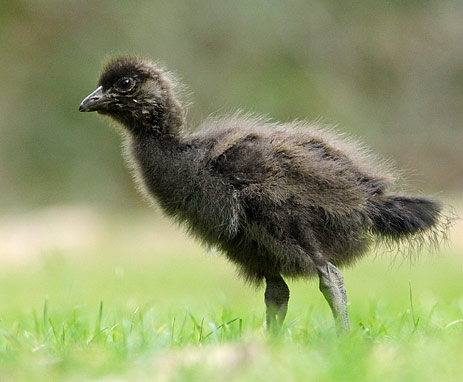
Chick

The breeding structure may be monogamous or polygamous, usually polyandrous. Each group contains a single breeding female who will mate with all the males of the group. The unusual social structure based on groups who stay together is not known to occur in many other species; the high ratio of male chicks to female chicks hatched is thought to be a possible explanation for this.

The breeding season begins in the period from July to September, depending upon rainfall and the availability of food. Birds will usually breed once per year, however in good years, with high availability of food, two broods may be produced. The nest is a rough, flattened grass mattress, among taller grasses and is usually built close to water, or on damp ground. With a clutch size of five to eight, the oval eggs measure around 56 by 38 millimetres (2.2 in × 1.5 in) and are a dull yellow or buff to brown with some spotting of reddish brown and lavender. As well as the primary nest, nursery nests are constructed with the purpose of roosting with chicks at night and as hiding places in case of predators. Chicks are covered in a dark brown fluffy down.

=== Feeding ===
The diet is mostly made up of grass shoots and the leaves of low herbs which it grazes during daylight hours. Birds will also eat insects, seeds and orchard fruit. The species has a reputation among farmers as an agricultural pest. The damage to agriculture was extensively studied in the 1960s by M Ridpath and G Meldrum, who found that although there is some damage to crops, rabbits were responsible for more damage. Many beliefs held by farmers about damage to crops were found to be unlikely, with damage probably caused by other species.

The species is a secondary grazer, meaning that it depends on other species to keep grass swards low and with fresh shoots. Before European settlement in Tasmania, the cleared spaces required for feeding would probably have been provided by Indigenous burning of grasslands to provide feeding grounds for mammals, which would be hunted for food. The expansion of these cleared grassy areas, and the introduction of rabbits, has provided greater food sources and consequently greater numbers of the species within its range.

== Conservation and threats ==
The species is currently classified as a species of least concern by the IUCN. Although there is a healthy population size and no significant falls have been measured, there is concern about the possible arrival of the red fox in Tasmania and the potential impact that it would have on this and other species.

Since 15 August 2007 it has been protected under Tasmanian legislation. Prior to this it was one of only four native birds that had no legal protection in the state of Tasmania outside national parks and other reserves — the last of Tasmania's 12 endemic bird species with this dubious status. The three remaining unprotected native species are the forest raven, the great cormorant, and the little pied cormorant. All other native Tasmanian birds are listed as protected under the state's Nature Conservation Act 2002.
