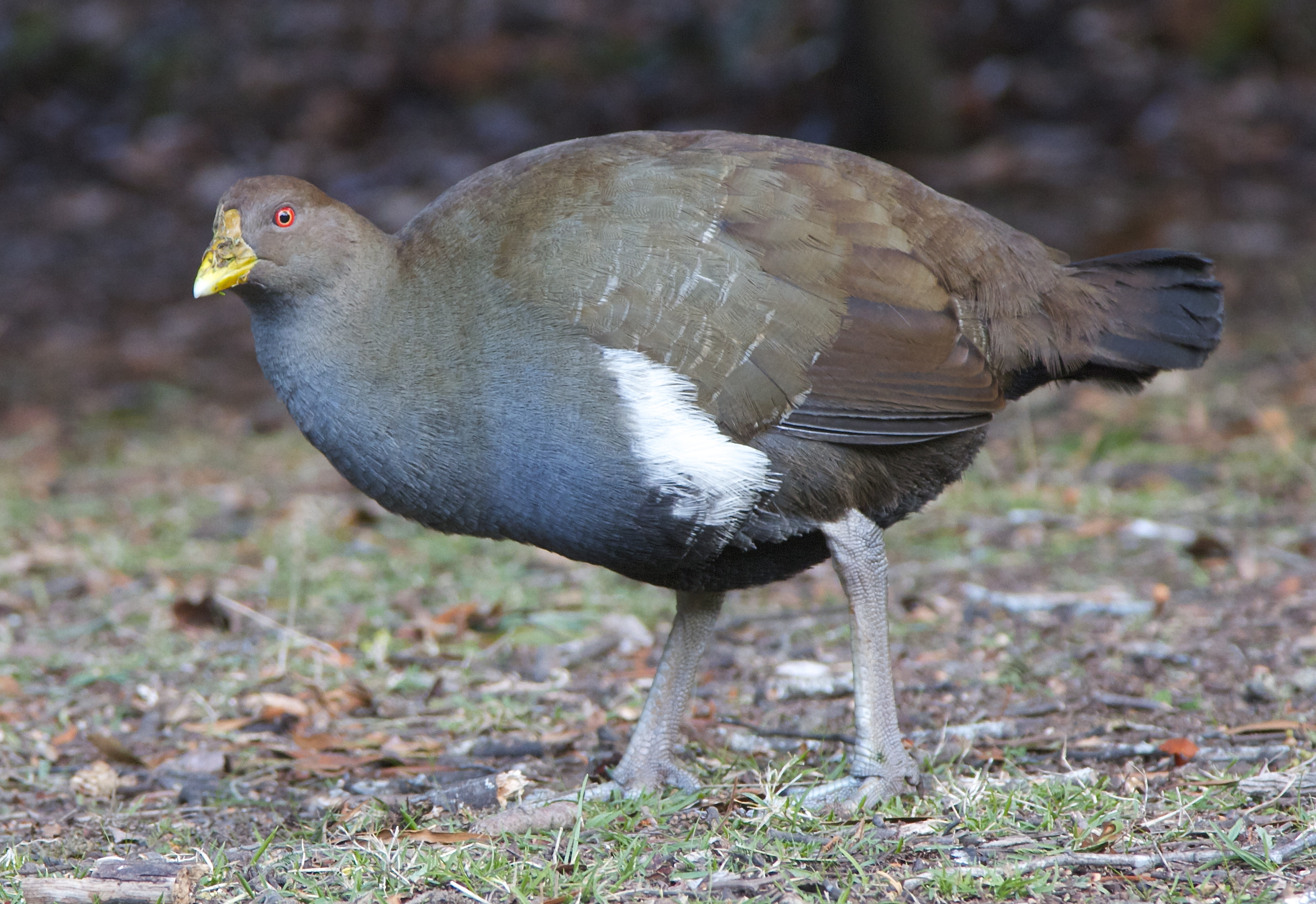
- Tasmanian nativehen in Mount Field National Park

Scientific classification
- Kingdom: Animalia
- Phylum: Chordata
- Class: Aves
- Order: Gruiformes
- Family: Rallidae
- Genus: Tribonyx; Du Bus de Gisignies, 1840

Type species
- Tribonix mortierii De Bus, 1840

Species
- See text

= Tribonyx =

Genus of birds

Tribonyx is a small genus of birds in the rail family, containing two extant species and one recently extinct species. The genus is endemic to Australia. They were formerly often lumped with the moorhens in the genus Gallinula, but differ visually by shorter, thicker and stubbier toes and bills, and longer tails that lack the white signal pattern of typical moorhens.

The New Zealand giant crake was formerly included in Tribonyx, however in 2025 an mtDNA analysis revealed it to be a member of the crake genus Porzana.

== Species ==
| Image | Common name | Scientific name | Distribution |
|---|---|---|---|
| | Black-tailed nativehen | Tribonyx ventralis (Gould, 1837) | Australia |
| | Tasmanian nativehen | Tribonyx mortierii Du Bus de Gisignies, 1840 | Tasmania |
