= Coat of arms of Wallis and Futuna =

The unofficial coat of arms of Wallis and Futuna consists of elements from the unofficial flag of Wallis and Futuna featuring a red saltire on a white square, which in turn is placed on a red field (alternatively, a larger white cross pattée is used). The cross is placed on the lower right; the flag of France outlined in white on two sides is in the upper left quadrant. The coat of arms, like the flag, is unofficial.

The official territorial seal is based on the Great Seal of France.

Unofficial coat of arms of Wallis and Futuna

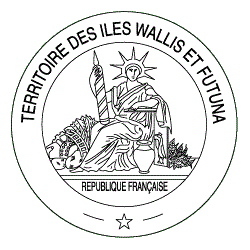
Official seal of Wallis and Futuna
