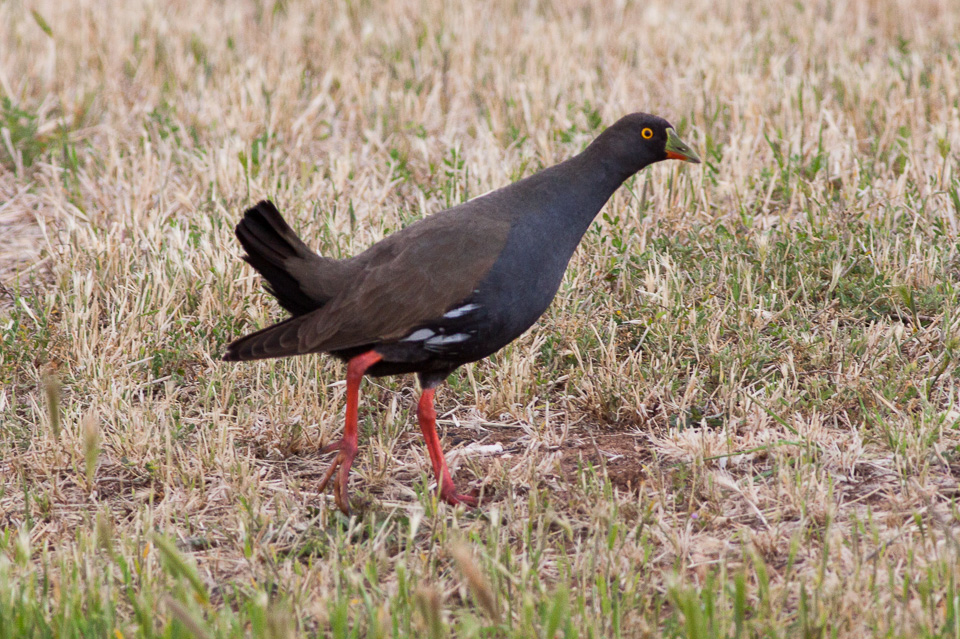

Conservation status
- Least Concern (IUCN 3.1)

Scientific classification
- Kingdom: Animalia
- Phylum: Chordata
- Class: Aves
- Order: Gruiformes
- Family: Rallidae
- Genus: Tribonyx
- Species: T. ventralis

Binomial name
- Tribonyx ventralis (Gould, 1837)
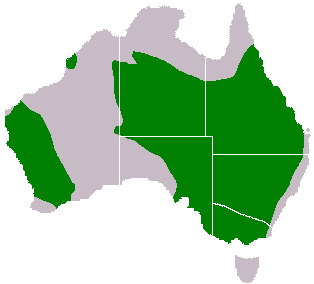
- Range in green

Synonyms
- Gallinula ventralis

= Black-tailed nativehen =

Species of bird

The black-tailed nativehen (Tribonyx ventralis) is a rail native to Australia.

== Description ==
The black-tailed nativehen is a large dark bird, reaching about 38 cm in length and weighing around 400 g (0.88 lb). This species possesses an erect tail and is endowed almost entirely with brownish-grey and green feathers. Its long legs and lower jaw are a striking pink-orange colour, as well as its eyes which are more of a bright orange colour. This species is not excessively vocal, its main call is an alarm 'kak' sound. They become noticeable when they are seen in small flocks on the ground. Their erect tails and social behaviour are reminiscent of domestic hens.

== Habitat ==
This species is nomadic, following seasonal water sources. It is found year-round living near fresh and brackish water.

== Distribution ==
The black-tailed nativehen is common throughout Australia, where it lives by permanent as well as intermittent water sources. It has a large range, with an estimated global extent of occurrence of 1,000,000–10,000,000 km^{2}. It is classified as Least Concern by IUCN. It is a rare vagrant to New Zealand, and occasional to Tasmania.

== Reproduction ==
Breeding generally takes place between August and December or when conditions are favourable. A cup-shaped nest is built in vegetation near water or swampland. 5–7 pale green eggs are laid and incubated for approximately 20 days.

== Diet ==
This species' diet consists of insects, plant material and seeds. In farming areas, the black-tailed nativehen is capable of causing crop damage.
