= HMS Moorhen =

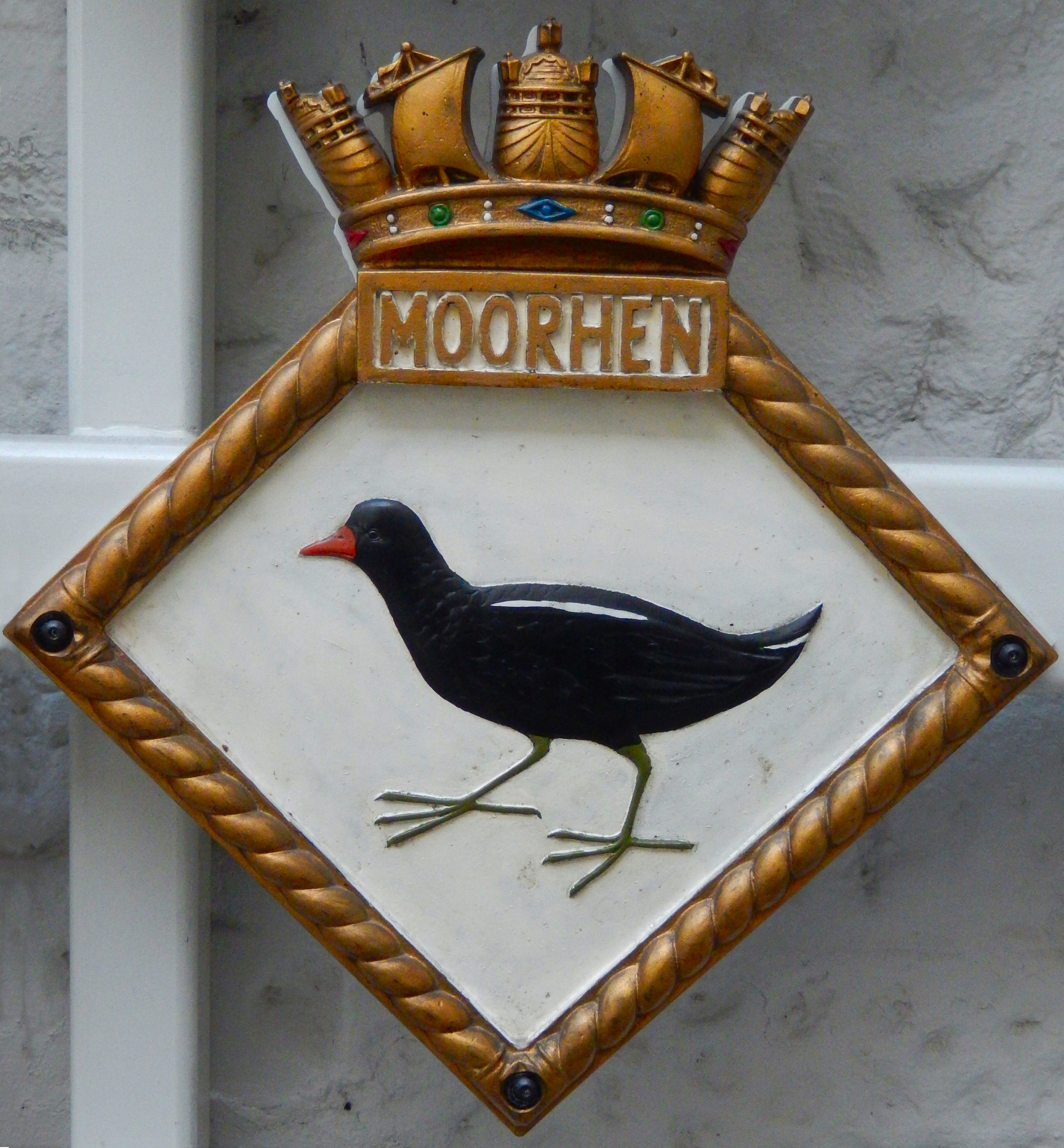
Badge of HMS Moorhen. National Maritime Museum, Greenwich

Three ships of the Royal Navy have borne the name HMS Moorhen, after the moorhen, a water bird:

- HMS Moorhen (1875) was a Forester-class composite screw gunboat launched in 1875 and sold in 1888.
- HMS Moorhen was a composite paddle vessel launched in 1880 as HMS Niger. She was renamed HMS Cockatrice in 1881, and HMS Moorhen in 1896. She was sold in 1899.
- HMS Moorhen (1901) was a river gunboat launched in 1901 and sold in 1933.
