= Makira woodhen =

Conservation status
- Critically Endangered (IUCN 3.1)

Scientific classification
- Kingdom: Animalia
- Phylum: Chordata
- Class: Aves
- Order: Gruiformes
- Family: Rallidae
- Genus: Gallinula
- Species: G. silvestris

Binomial name
- Gallinula silvestris (Mayr, 1933)

Synonyms
- Pareudiastes silvestris

Species of bird

The Makira woodhen (Gallinula silvestris), also known as the Makira moorhen, San Cristobal moorhen, or kia, is a species of bird in the family Rallidae endemic to the subtropical or tropical moist lowland forests and montane forests of the Solomon Islands.

== Taxonomy ==
The Makira woodhen was discovered on the island of Makira in 1929 by German-American evolutionary biologist Ernst Mayr. It has no known subspecies.

== Description ==
Only one specimen of this bird exists, a male Makira woodhen. The head, neck, and breast are a dark, slaty-blue color, with a black wash on the chin and face. The body is dull brownish-black, and the tail is very short. The scapulars, wing-coverts, and secondaries are a dark olive-brown. The legs and feet are slender and are bright scarlet. The bill is also bright scarlet, and is strong and laterally compressed. The shield on the front of the bird's face is dark blue. The specimen is 26 centimeters long (10.2 inches) and weighs 450 grams (15.9 ounces).

== Conservation status ==
An individual of this species was sighted in 1953, and it was reported to be well-known amongst guides from the Ghoghe village. A number of reports matching the description of the species were made, but despite several surveys in the early 2010s, the bird has not been documented since the 1953 sighting. It is listed as critically endangered by the IUCN.
