= List of villages in Wallis and Futuna =

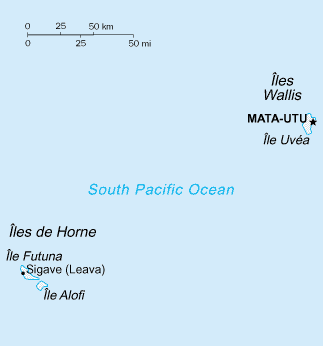
Map of Wallis and Futuna

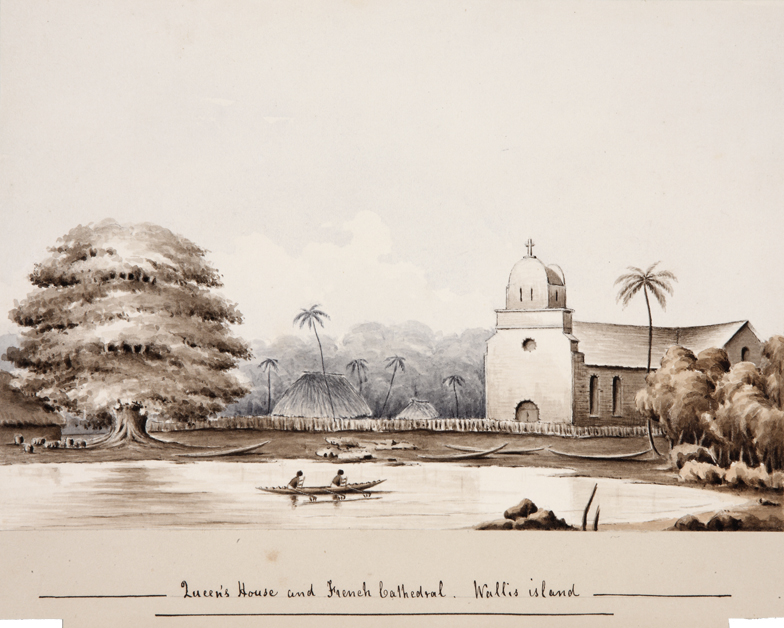
Illustration of Mata-Utu cathedral in 1862

There are 36 villages with municipal status in Wallis and Futuna, including the capital Mata'utu. The total population at the census of population of 2018 was 11,558.

== List ==
The villages are listed by district, from the largest to the smallest:

Village	Population	District	Chiefdom
Alele	524	Hihifo	Uvea
Vaitupu	406	Hihifo	Uvea
Mala'e	504	Hihifo	Uvea
Vailala	341	Hihifo	Uvea
Tufuone	167	Hihifo	Uvea
Mata'utu	1,029	Hahake	Uvea
Liku	605	Hahake	Uvea
Falaleu	572	Hahake	Uvea
Aka'aka	474	Hahake	Uvea
Ahoa	436	Hahake	Uvea
Haafuasia	299	Hahake	Uvea
Utufua	602	Mua	Uvea
Halalo	471	Mua	Uvea
Vaimalau	371	Mua	Uvea
Lavegahau	330	Mua	Uvea
Teesi	216	Mua	Uvea
Malaefoou	171	Mua	Uvea
Gahi	249	Mua	Uvea
Tepa	270	Mua	Uvea
Haatofo	197	Mua	Uvea
Kolopopo	99	Mua	Uvea
Ono	524	Alo	Alo
Taoa	480	Alo	Alo
Kolia	254	Alo	Alo
Vele	209	Alo	Alo
Poi	160	Alo	Alo
Mala'e	168	Alo	Alo
Tamana	152	Alo	Alo
Tuatafa	2	Alo	Alo
Alofitai	1	Alo	Alo
Leava	322	Sigave	Sigave
Toloke	172	Sigave	Sigave
Nuku	204	Sigave	Sigave
Fiua	257	Sigave	Sigave
Vaisei	160	Sigave	Sigave
Tavai	160	Sigave	Sigave

Other villages (without municipal status)

- Alofivai (Hahake District)
- Fineveke (Mua District)
