= List of lakes of Wallis and Futuna =

List of lakes in the collectivity of Wallis and Futuna

This is a list of lakes in the French overseas collectivity of Wallis and Futuna.

Lake	Location	Area	Notes	Coordinates
Lake Alofivai	Northeast Wallis (Uvea)	5.8 hectares (14 acres)		13°15′42″S 176°10′17″W
Lake Kikila	Southeast Wallis (Uvea)	10.5 hectares (26 acres)		13°17′49″S 176°11′20″W
Lake Lalolalo	Southwest Wallis (Uvea)	15.2 hectares (38 acres)	Crater lake. Largest lake in Wallis and Futuna	13°18′00″S 176°14′02″W
Lake Lano	Southwest Wallis (Uvea)		Crater lake	13°17′39″S 176°14′25″W
Lake Lanumaha	South Wallis (Uvea)		Crater lake	13°18′55″S 176°12′37″W
Lake Lanutavake	Southwest Wallis (Uvea)	3.9 hectares (9.6 acres)	Crater lake	13°19′16″S 176°12′47″W
Lake Lanutuli	South Wallis (Uvea)		Crater lake	13°18′55″S 176°13′03″W
Vainifao Reservoir	Southwest Futuna		Artificial lake	14°17′45″S 178°08′25″W
