= List of museums in Wallis and Futuna =

Museums in Wallis and Futuna include:

- St Joseph's Church, Mala'efo'ou
- Talietumu archaeological site
- Tonga Toto archaeological site
- Uvea Museum Association
