= Mala'e =

Mala'e may refer to:

- Mala'e (Futuna)
- Mala'e (Wallis)
