= Lake Kikila =

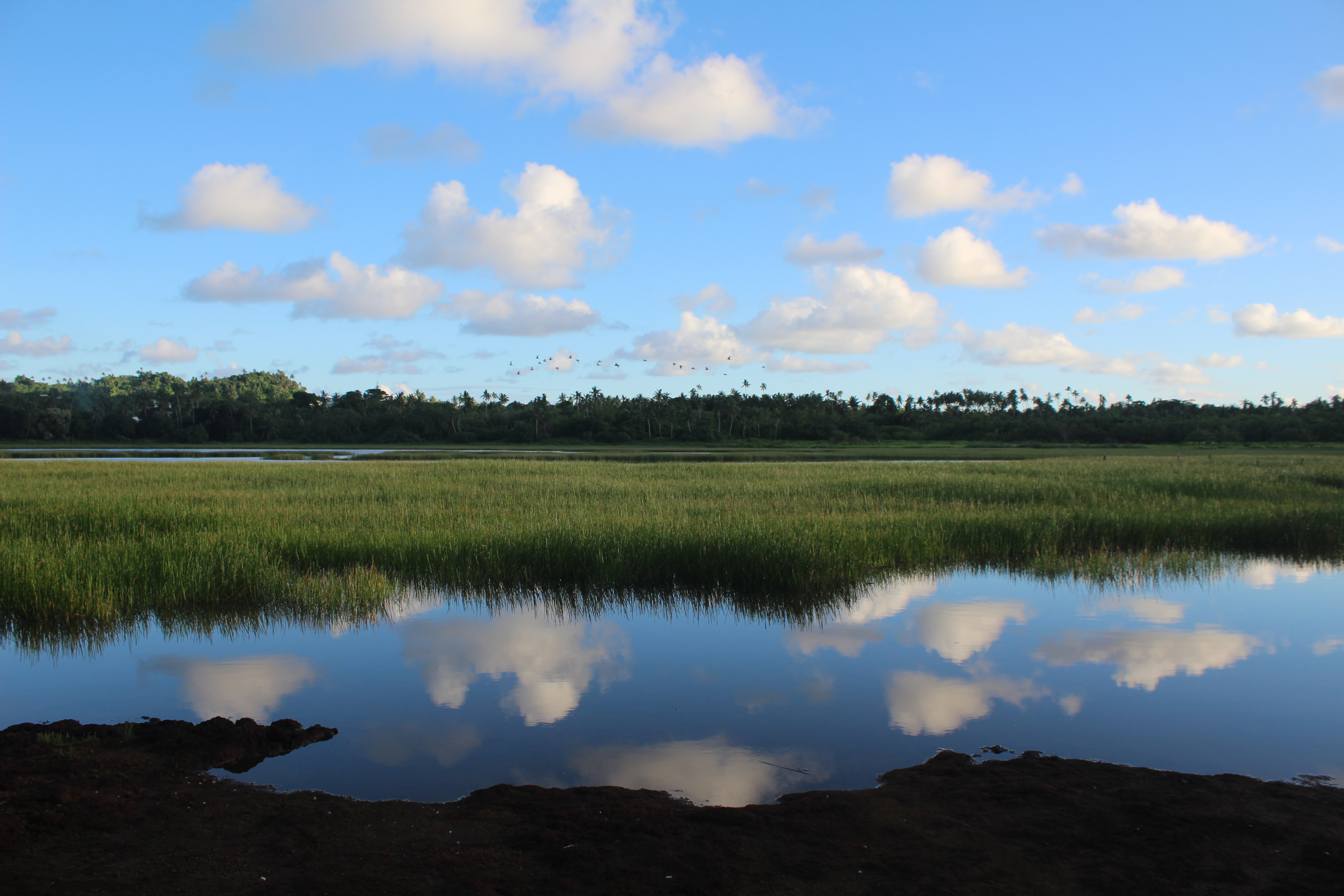
- Lake Kikila on Wallis island.

- Location within Pacific Ocean
- Location: Wallis island, Wallis and Futuna
- Coordinates: 13°17′49″S 176°11′20″W
- Type: Volcanic lake
- Surface area: 17.9 ha (44 acres)

Lake Kikila (French: Lac Kikila) is a lake on the southeastern side of Wallis (Uvea) in the French overseas collectivity of Wallis and Futuna, South Pacific. It is marginally the second lake largest lake on the island after Lake Lalolalo, although is not rounded like Lalolalo. It lies to the just to the southwest of Falaleu and northwest of Ha'afuasia.
