= Fineveke =

- Village
- Location in Wallis Island
- Coordinates: 13°19′38″S 176°13′18″W
- Country: France
- Territory: Wallis and Futuna
- Island: Wallis
- Chiefdom: Uvea
- District: Mua
- Time zone: UTC+12

Fineveke is a village in Wallis and Futuna. It is located in Mua District on the southwest coast of Wallis Island, just northwest of Halalo. Lake Lanutavake lies just to the northeast.

== Overview ==
It hosts a small private marina, visible on google maps with 14 boats harbored. The "chief of the rails" of Wallis lived in Fineveke.
