= Uvea (Wallis and Futuna) =

Kingdom of Uvea ʻPuleʻaga Hau ʻo ʻUvea
- Chiefdom
- Flag Seal

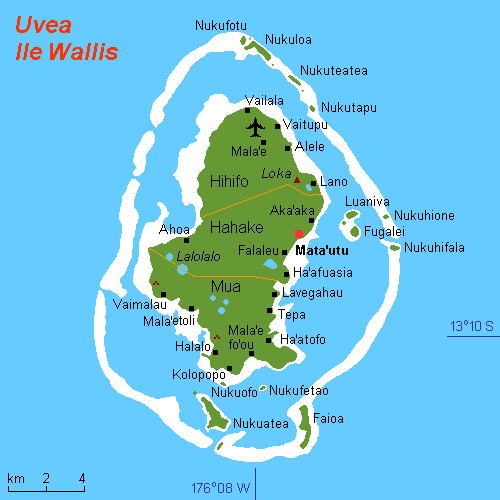
- Wallis island (Kingdom of Uvea) showing the 3 districts
- Coordinates: 13°17′S 176°12′W
- Country: France
- Territory: Wallis and Futuna
- Island: Wallis
- Capital: Mata Utu

Government
  - Type: Constitutional monarchy within an overseas collectivity
  - King: Patalione Kanimoa
  - Prime Minister: Setefano Hanisi

Area
  - Total: 159 km^{2} (61 sq mi)

Population (2018 census)
  - Total: 8,333
  - Density: 52.4/km^{2} (136/sq mi)
- Time zone: UTC+12
- No. of districts: 3
- No. of municipalities: 21

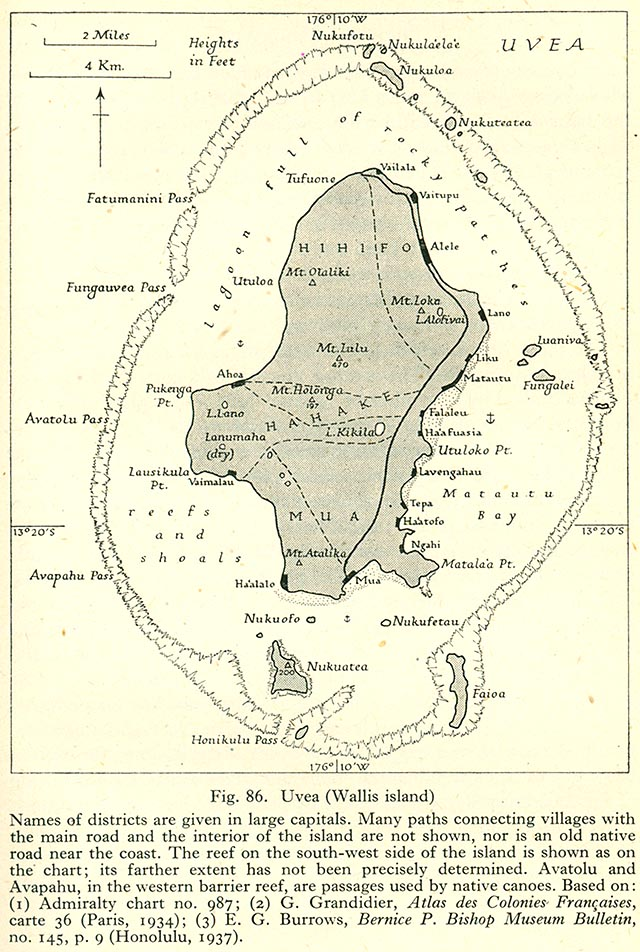
Map of Wallis island

ʻUvea (Wallisian: ʻUvea, French: Royaume coutumier de Uvea) is one of the three official chiefdoms (Royaume coutumier, lit. 'customary kingdom') of the French territory of Wallis and Futuna (the other two being Sigave and Alo) in Oceania in the South Pacific Ocean.

== Geography ==
=== Overview ===
ʻUvea encompasses the whole of Wallis and the surrounding islets. The total area of the kingdom is 96 square kilometres (37 sq mi) with a population of 8,333 spread over three districts. The capital and largest village is Mata Utu, situated on the east coast with a population of 1,029.

=== Administrative division ===
The chiefdom counts 3 districts and 21 municipalities:

Districts

| District | Population (Census 2018) |
|---|---|
| Hihifo | 1,942 |
| Hahake | 3,415 |
| Mu'a | 2,976 |

Municipal villages

| Village | Population | District |
|---|---|---|
| Alele | 524 | Hihifo |
| Vaitupu | 406 | Hihifo |
| Mala'e | 504 | Hihifo |
| Vailala | 341 | Hihifo |
| Tufu'one | 167 | Hihifo |
| Mata Utu | 1,029 | Hahake |
| Liku | 605 | Hahake |
| Falaleu | 572 | Hahake |
| Aka'aka | 474 | Hahake |
| Ahoa | 436 | Hahake |
| Ha'afuasia | 299 | Hahake |
| Utufua | 602 | Mua |
| Halalo | 471 | Mua |
| Vaimalau | 371 | Mua |
| Lavegahau | 330 | Mua |
| Te'esi | 216 | Mua |
| Mala'efo'ou | 171 | Mua |
| Gahi | 249 | Mua |
| Tepa | 270 | Mua |
| Ha'atofo | 197 | Mua |
| Kolopopo | 99 | Mua |

Other villages

| Village | Population | District |
|---|---|---|
| Alofivai | 437 | Hahake |
| Fineveke | ? | Mua |

== History ==
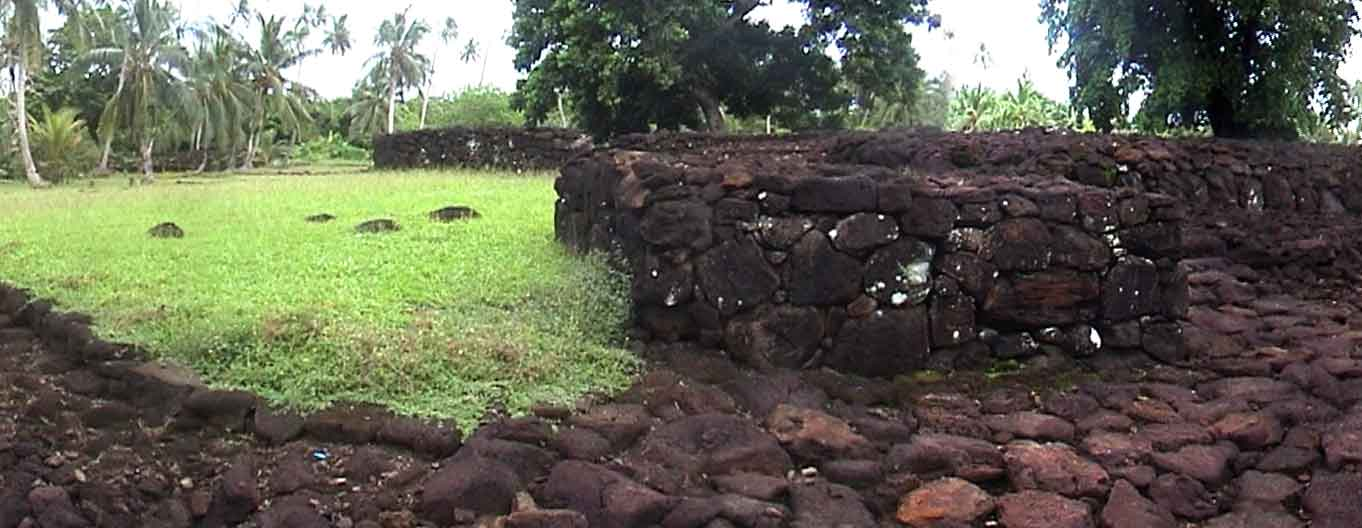
Talietumu archaeological site

Uvean flag between 1860 and 1896

ʻUvea has probably been inhabited by Polynesians since the 15th century CE and was then part of the Tuʻi Tonga Empire. The two archaeological sites of Talietumu and Tonga Toto are remains from that period.

The kingdom of ʻUvea was founded sometimes in the 15th century and the monarch was titled Tuʻi ʻUvea (king).

April 5, 1887 the island became a French protectorate after queen Amelia Tokagahahau Aliki signed a treaty with France but keeping her royal powers.

In 1888 Sigave and Alo also signed the treaty with France thus creating the "Wallis and Futuna Islands Protectorate".

In 1961 the status was upgraded to being a French overseas territory (territoire d'outre-mer) and in 2003 Wallis and Futuna became a French overseas collectivity (collectivité d'outre-mer), but the local royal powers continue.

== See also ==
- Wallis Island
- List of kings of Uvea
- Dance of Wallis and Futuna
- Customary kingdoms of Wallis and Futuna
- Royal Palace of Uvea
