= Te'esi =

- Village
- Location in Wallis Island
- Coordinates: 13°21′4″S 176°12′15″W
- Country: France
- Territory: Wallis and Futuna
- Island: Wallis
- Chiefdom: Uvea
- District: Mua

Population (2018)
  - Total: 216
- Time zone: UTC+12

Te'esi is a village in Wallis and Futuna. It is located in Mua District on the southern coast of Wallis Island. Its population according to the 2018 census was 216 people. It is the southernmost settlement on the island located on the southern tip, overlooking Mua Bay.
