= Tepa, Wallis and Futuna =

Tepa
- Village
- Location in Wallis Island
- Coordinates: 13°19′25″S 176°11′12″W
- Country: France
- Territory: Wallis and Futuna
- Island: Wallis
- Chiefdom: Uvea
- District: Mua

Population (2018)
  - Total: 270
- Time zone: UTC+12

Tepa is a village in Wallis and Futuna. It is located in Mua District on the southeastern coast of Wallis Island. Its population according to the 2018 census was 270 people.
