= Tufu'one =

- Village
- Location in Wallis Island
- Coordinates: 13°13′25″S 176°12′41″W
- Country: France
- Territory: Wallis and Futuna
- Island: Wallis
- Chiefdom: Uvea
- District: Hihifo

Population (2018)
  - Total: 167
- Time zone: UTC+12

Tufu'one is a village in Wallis and Futuna. It is located in Hihifo District on the northwest coast of Wallis Island. Its population according to the 2018 census was 167 people.
