= Lake Lanutavake =

- Lac Lanutavake (French)
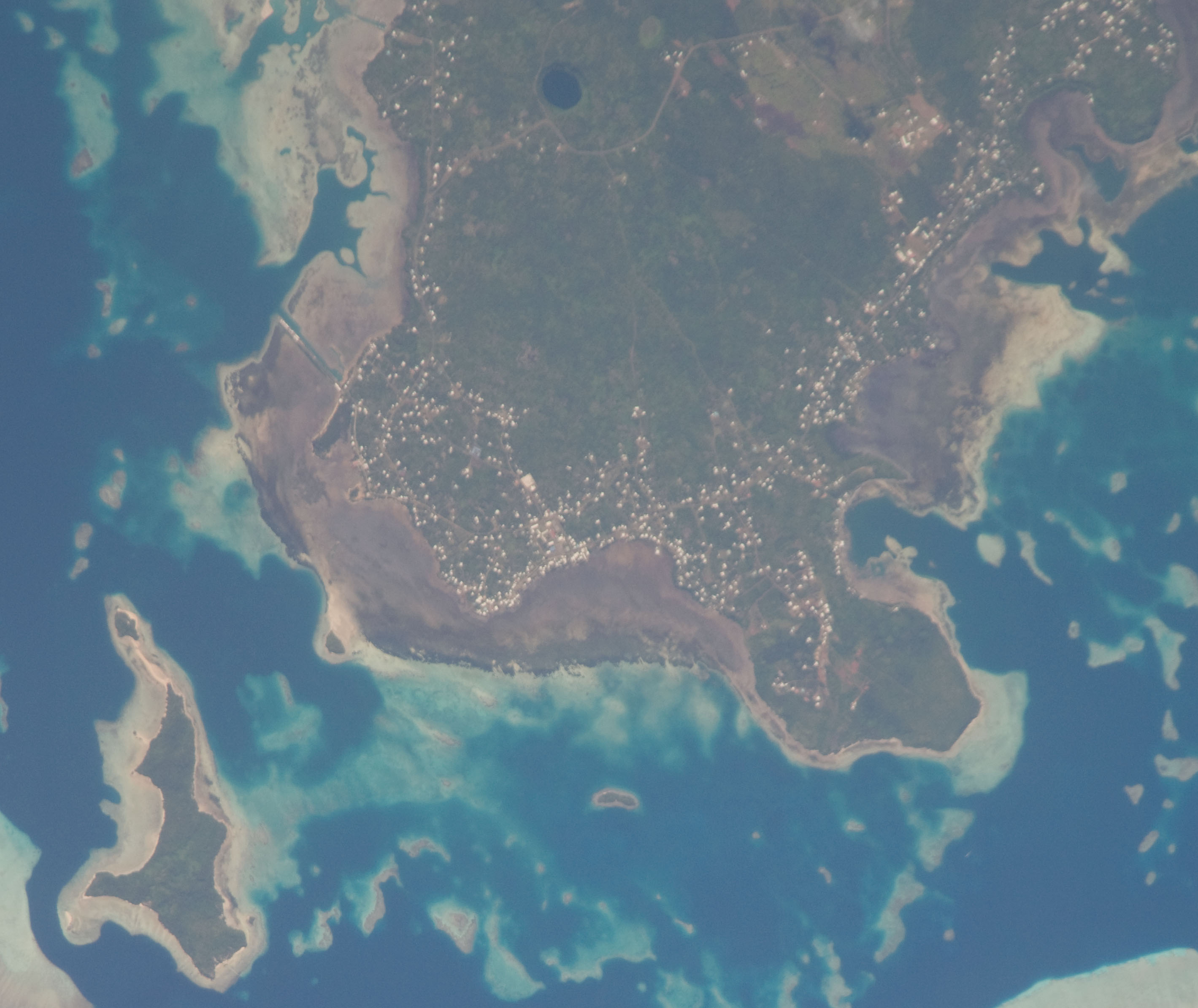
- Lake Lanutavake is in the upper left corner of this satellite picture of Wallis island.

- Location within Pacific Ocean
- Location: Wallis, Wallis and Futuna
- Coordinates: 13°18′16″S 176°12′47″W
- Type: Volcanic lake

Lake Lanutavake (French: Lac Lanutavake) is a small crater lake surrounded by jungle on the southwest side of Wallis (Uvea) in the Pacific. It lies to the northeast of Fineveke. Like Lake Lalolalo, there is a rumor that the US military dumped equipment in the lake at the end of World War II. The smaller lakes Lanumaha and Lanutuli lie to the northeast and northwest respectively.

The archaeological site Tonga Toto is located close to the lake.
