= Kolopopo =

- Village
- Location in Wallis Island
- Coordinates: 13°20′54″S 176°12′52″W
- Country: France
- Territory: Wallis and Futuna
- Island: Wallis
- Chiefdom: Uvea
- District: Mua

Population (2018)
  - Total: 99
- Time zone: UTC+12

Kolopopo is a village in Wallis and Futuna, which is a French island collectivity in the South Pacific containing 36 villages. It is located in Mua District on the southwest coast of Wallis Island. Its population according to the 2018 census was 99 people. The population has declined in this area due to lack of job opportunities and political tension on the main island. The currency used is Comptoirs Français du Pacifique (CFP) Franc.

The major ethnic group in this island region is Polynesian. Nearly 60% of the population speak Wallisian, 28% speak Futunan and over 12% speak French. 99% of inhabitants in this region are of the Roman Catholic faith.
