= Hahake District =

Hahake
- District
- Map of Wallis Island showing the 3 districts: Hahake is located in the middle
- Coordinates: 13°17′S 176°11′W
- Country: France
- Territory: Wallis and Futuna
- Island: Wallis
- Chiefdom: Uvea
- Capital: Mata Utu

Area
  - Total: 27.8 km^{2} (10.7 sq mi)

Population (2018)
  - Total: 3,415
- Time zone: UTC+12
- No. of municipalities: 6

Hahake (Uvean for "East") is one of the 5 districts of Wallis and Futuna, located in Wallis Island, in the Pacific Ocean. It is part of the Chiefdom of Uvea.

== Geography ==
Located in the middle of the island, Hahake borders with the districts of Hihifo and Mua. Mata Utu (also spelled Mata-Utu and Matāʻutu) is the capital of the district, and of the Wallis and Futuna Territory as a whole.

The district is divided into 6 municipal villages:

Village	Population
Mata Utu	1,029
Liku	605
Falaleu	572
Aka'aka	474
Ahoa	436
Haafuasia	299

== See also ==
- Alofivai
- Talietumu
