= Alofivai =

- Village
- Location in Wallis Island
- Coordinates: 13°15′42″S 176°10′2″W
- Country: France
- Territory: Wallis and Futuna
- Island: Wallis
- Chiefdom: Uvea
- District: Hahake

Population (2008)
  - Total: 437
- Time zone: UTC+12

Alofivai is a village in Wallis and Futuna. It is located in Hahake District on the northeast coast of Wallis Island, along Route 1. The hamlets of Finetomai and Papakila also form part of the area.

== Overview ==
Alofivai is the educational capital of Wallis, containing numerous Catholic churches, institutions and schools. Alofivai contains the only secondary school/college in the Wallis and Futuna territory, established by the mission in 1922 The college is located just to the northwest of Lake Alofivai. During drier spells cows owned by the college reportedly graze in the crater lake. However, during wetter periods, the lake is populated with frogs.
