= Haʻatofo =

- Village
- Location in Wallis Island
- Coordinates: 13°19′38″S 176°11′25″W
- Country: France
- Territory: Wallis and Futuna
- Island: Wallis
- Chiefdom: Uvea
- District: Mua

Population (2018)
  - Total: 197
- Time zone: UTC+12

Haʻatofo is a village in Wallis and Futuna. It is located in Mua District on the southeast coast of Wallis Island. Its population according to the 2018 census was 197 people.
