= Nuku (disambiguation) =

Nuku was a historical province on the island of Hiva Oa.

Nuku may also refer to:

== Places ==
- Nuku, Papua New Guinea, a district capital in Papua New Guinea
- Nuku District, Papua New Guinea
- Nuku Hiva, largest of the Marquesas Islands
- Nuku, Wallis and Futuna, a village in Futuna Island

== People ==
- Nuku of Tidore (c. 1738–1805), anti-colonial rebel leader and Sultan of Tidore

== Media ==
- Nuku Nuku, a manga character
