= Vailala =

- Village
- Location in Wallis Island
- Coordinates: 13°13′17″S 176°12′22″W
- Country: France
- Territory: Wallis and Futuna
- Island: Wallis
- Chiefdom: Uvea
- District: Hihifo

Population (2018)
  - Total: 341
- Time zone: UTC+12

Vailala is a village in Wallis and Futuna. It is located in Hihifo District on the northeast coast of Wallis Island. Its population according to the 2018 census was 341 people.
