= Gahi =

- Village
- Location in Wallis Island
- Coordinates: 13°20′12″S 176°11′13″W
- Country: France
- Territory: Wallis and Futuna
- Island: Wallis
- Chiefdom: Uvea
- District: Mua

Population (2018)
  - Total: 249
- Time zone: UTC+12

Gahi is a village in Wallis and Futuna. It is located in Mua District on the southeast coast of Wallis Island on Gahi Bay. Its population according to the 2018 census was 249 people.
