= Liku =

Liku may refer to:

== People ==
- ʻAloʻalo Liku, Tongan javelin and discus thrower
- Ana Siulolo Liku (born 1974), Tongan hurdler
- Maria Liku (born 1990), Fijian weightlifter
- Tauʻalupe Liku, Tongan rugby league football player

== Places ==
- Liku, Niue
- Liku, Wallis and Futuna
- Liku, another name for Likhu Khola, a river in Nepal
