= Ha'afuasia =

- Village
- Location in Wallis Island
- Coordinates: 13°18′0″S 176°11′6″W
- Country: France
- Territory: Wallis and Futuna
- Island: Wallis
- Chiefdom: Uvea
- District: Hahake

Population (2018)
  - Total: 299
- Time zone: UTC+12

Ha'afuasia is a village in Wallis and Futuna. It is located in Hahake District on the east coast of Wallis Island. Its population according to the 2018 census was 299 people. To the northwest is Lake Kikila.
