= Nukuhifala =

Coordinates: 13°17′19″S 176°7′36″W

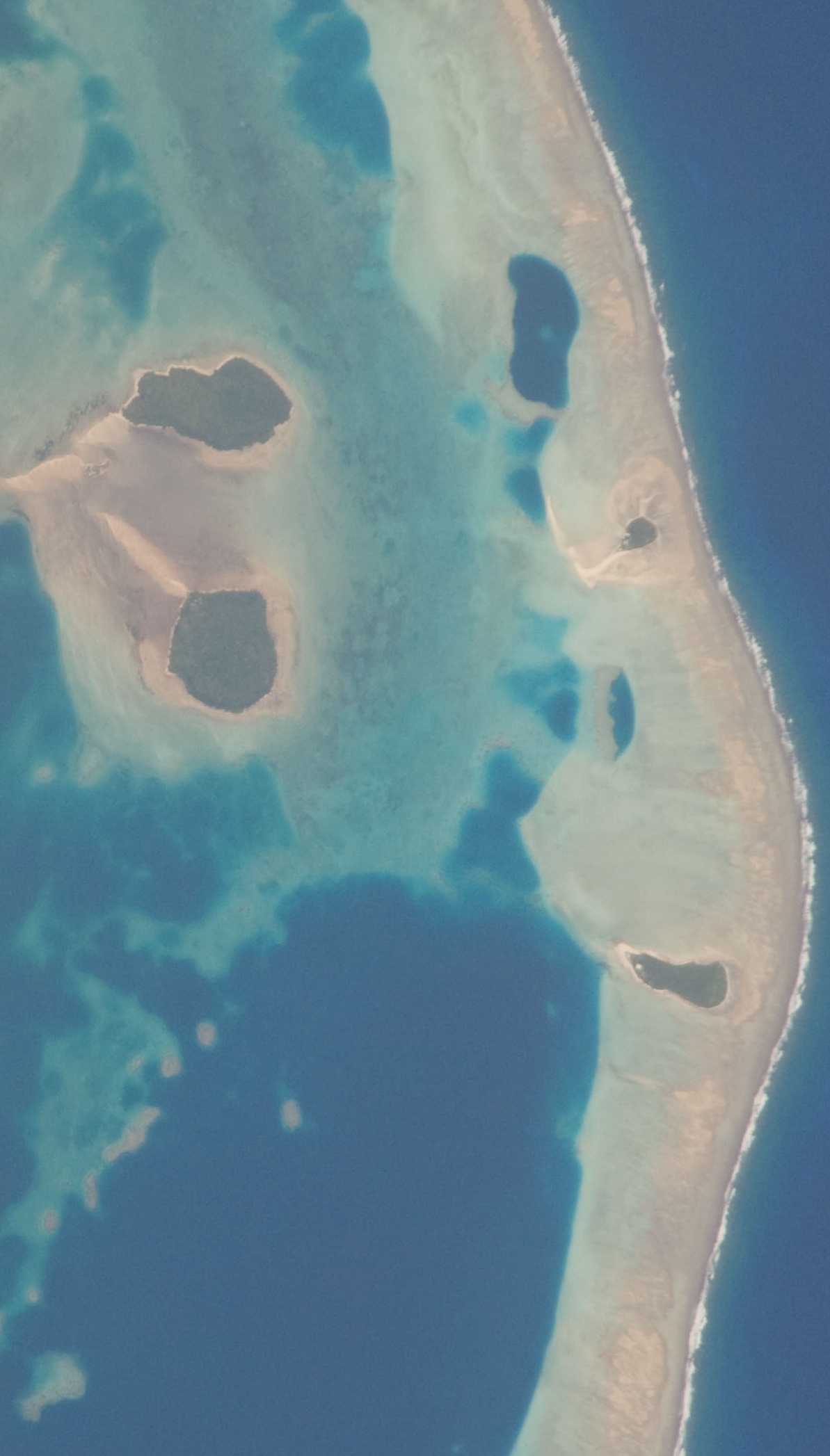
Space view of the Wallis island lagoon including Nukuhifala island

Nukuhifala is an islet of Wallis and Futuna. It is located off the east coast of Mata-Utu, Wallis Island. The only settlement is a tiny hamlet on the southwest coast. It lies on the outer coral reef. It has a population of four.
