= Aka'aka =

- Village
- Location in Wallis Island
- Coordinates: 13°16′37″S 176°10′17″W
- Country: France
- Territory: Wallis and Futuna
- Island: Wallis
- Chiefdom: Uvea
- District: Hahake

Population (2018)
  - Total: 474
- Time zone: UTC+12

Aka'aka is a village in Wallis and Futuna. It is located in Hahake District on Wallis Island. Its population according to the 2018 census was 474 people.
