= Ahoa =

- Village
- Location in Wallis Island
- Coordinates: 13°17′3″S 176°14′8″W
- Country: France
- Territory: Wallis and Futuna
- Island: Wallis
- Chiefdom: Uvea
- District: Hahake

Population (2018)
  - Total: 436
- Time zone: UTC+12

Ahoa is a village in Wallis and Futuna. It is located in Hahake District on the west coast of Wallis Island. Its population, according to the 2018 census, was 436 people. To the southeast is Lake Lalolalo, a volcanic crater lake which is the largest on the island.
