= Nuku, Wallis and Futuna =

Nuku
- Village
- Location in Futuna Island
- Coordinates: 14°17′20.76″S 178°10′0.12″W
- Country: France
- Territory: Wallis and Futuna
- Island: Futuna
- Chiefdom and District: Sigave
- Elevation: 6 m (20 ft)

Population (2018)
  - Total: 204
- Time zone: UTC+12

Nuku is a village in Wallis and Futuna. It is located in Sigave District on the northwestern coast of Futuna Island. Its population according to the 2018 census was 204 people.

== Overview ==
The village lies between Leava, the district seat, and Vaisei. Its major building is the church of Sausau (French: Eglise de Sausau).
