= Hihifo District =

Hihifo
- District
- Map of Wallis Island showing the 3 districts: Hihifo is located in the north
- Coordinates: 13°13′35″S 176°11′15″W
- Country: France
- Territory: Wallis and Futuna
- Island: Wallis
- Chiefdom: ʻUvea
- Capital: Vaitupu

Area
  - Total: 23.4 km^{2} (9.0 sq mi)

Population (2018)
  - Total: 1,942
- Time zone: UTC+12
- No. of municipalities: 5

Hihifo (Uvean for "West") is one of the 5 districts of Wallis and Futuna, located in Wallis Island, in the Pacific Ocean. It is part of the Chiefdom of ʻUvea.

== Geography ==
Located in the northern side of the island, Hihifo borders with the districts of Hahake. Vaitupu is the administrative seat.

The district is divided into 5 municipal villages:

Village	Population
Alele	524
Vaitupu	406
Mala'e	504
Vailala	341
Tufuone	167

=== Climate ===
Hihifo has a tropical rainforest climate (Köppen climate classification Af). The average annual temperature in Hihifo is 27.6 °C (81.7 °F). The average annual rainfall is 3,278.7 mm (129.08 in) with January as the wettest month. The temperatures are highest on average in April, at around 28.0 °C (82.4 °F), and lowest in July, at around 27.0 °C (80.6 °F). The highest temperature ever recorded in Hihifo was 33.4 °C (92.1 °F) on 29 April 2004; the coldest temperature ever recorded was 18.0 °C (64.4 °F) on 14 July 2014.

Climate data for Hihifo (1991–2020 averages, extremes 1971−present)
Month	Jan	Feb	Mar	Apr	May	Jun	Jul	Aug	Sep	Oct	Nov	Dec	Year
Record high °C (°F)	33.0 (91.4)	33.0 (91.4)	32.8 (91.0)	33.4 (92.1)	32.8 (91.0)	32.1 (89.8)	31.4 (88.5)	31.5 (88.7)	32.0 (89.6)	31.9 (89.4)	33.1 (91.6)	32.7 (90.9)	33.4 (92.1)
Mean daily maximum °C (°F)	30.7 (87.3)	30.8 (87.4)	30.9 (87.6)	30.8 (87.4)	30.4 (86.7)	29.8 (85.6)	29.4 (84.9)	29.6 (85.3)	29.9 (85.8)	30.1 (86.2)	30.5 (86.9)	30.7 (87.3)	30.3 (86.5)
Daily mean °C (°F)	27.9 (82.2)	27.9 (82.2)	27.9 (82.2)	28.0 (82.4)	27.7 (81.9)	27.5 (81.5)	27.0 (80.6)	27.1 (80.8)	27.3 (81.1)	27.4 (81.3)	27.6 (81.7)	27.9 (82.2)	27.6 (81.7)
Mean daily minimum °C (°F)	25.0 (77.0)	25.0 (77.0)	25.0 (77.0)	25.1 (77.2)	25.0 (77.0)	25.1 (77.2)	24.6 (76.3)	24.6 (76.3)	24.8 (76.6)	24.7 (76.5)	24.8 (76.6)	25.0 (77.0)	24.9 (76.8)
Record low °C (°F)	19.9 (67.8)	20.5 (68.9)	19.6 (67.3)	19.3 (66.7)	18.5 (65.3)	19.7 (67.5)	18.0 (64.4)	18.4 (65.1)	19.2 (66.6)	19.5 (67.1)	20.5 (68.9)	19.5 (67.1)	18.0 (64.4)
Average precipitation mm (inches)	395.2 (15.56)	332.1 (13.07)	309.3 (12.18)	289.1 (11.38)	223.8 (8.81)	179.7 (7.07)	213.4 (8.40)	165.3 (6.51)	219.8 (8.65)	297.8 (11.72)	306.2 (12.06)	347.0 (13.66)	3,278.7 (129.08)
Average precipitation days (≥ 1.0 mm)	20.2	18.1	19.3	17.4	16.7	14.8	15.6	14.5	15.4	17.7	18.0	19.9	207.6
Mean monthly sunshine hours	170.9	161.4	175.4	185.9	180.8	167.9	179.8	192.5	191.0	187.4	181.6	175.2	2,149.9
Source: Météo France

== See also ==
- Hihifo Airport
