= Sigave =

Sigavé Singave / Sigave
- Chiefdom and District
- Flag

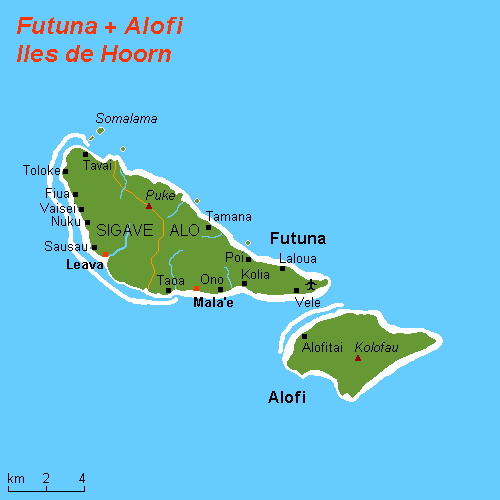
- Sigave and Alo within the Hoorn Islands
- Coordinates: 14°17′45.96″S 178°9′30.6″W
- Country: France
- Territory: Wallis and Futuna
- Island: Futuna
- Capital: Leava

Government
  - King (Tu'i Sigave): Eufenio Takala

Area
  - Total: 30 km^{2} (12 sq mi)

Population (2018)
  - Total: 1,275
  - Density: 53/km^{2} (140/sq mi)
- Time zone: UTC+12
- No. of districts: 1 (Sigave)
- No. of municipalities: 6

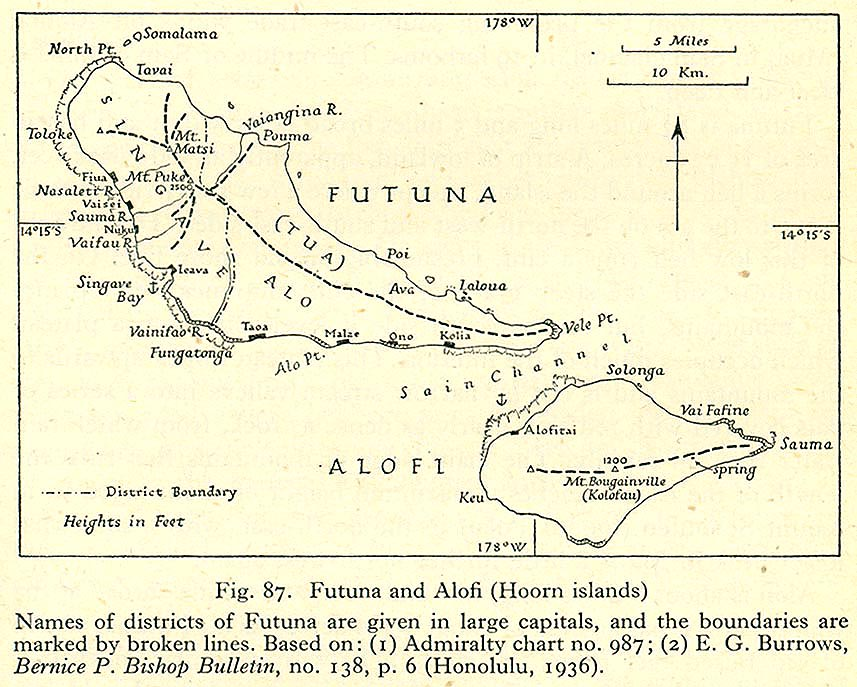
Map of Hoorn Islands

Sigavé (also Singave or Sigave) is one of the three official chiefdoms of the French territory of Wallis and Futuna in Oceania in the South Pacific Ocean. (The other two chiefdoms are Uvea and Alo.)

== Geography ==
=== Overview ===
Sigave encompasses the western third of Futuna Island (30 km^{2} of Futuna Island's total area of 83 km^{2}). Sigave has six villages, which together had a population of 1,275 as of the 2018 census. The capital and largest village is Leava (pop. 322).

=== Administrative division ===
The chiefdom of Sigave is coextensive with the district of the same name. Its six villages (or municipalities) are as follows:

Village	Population	District	Zone
Leava	322	Sigave	West to Southwest Coast
Toloke	172	Sigave	West to Southwest Coast
Nuku	204	Sigave	West to Southwest Coast
Fiua	257	Sigave	West to Southwest Coast
Vaisei	160	Sigave	West to Southwest Coast
Tavai	160	Sigave	North Coast

== Education ==
The junior high school in the area is Collège Fiua de Sigave.

== See also ==
- Hoorn Islands
- List of kings of Sigave
- Customary kingdoms of Wallis and Futuna
