= Mala'efo'ou =

Malaʻefoʻou
- Village
- Location in Wallis Island
- Coordinates: 13°20′25″S 176°11′30″W
- Country: France
- Territory: Wallis and Futuna
- Island: Wallis
- Chiefdom: Uvea
- District: Mua

Population (2018)
  - Total: 171
- Time zone: UTC+12

Malaʻefoʻou, formerly Mua, is a village in Wallis and Futuna. It is located in Mua District on the southeast coast of Wallis Island.

== Overview ==
Malaʻefoʻou is the main town in the district, located about 8 km south of Mata-Utu. Its population according to the 2018 census was 171 people. Except a few industrial buildings the village is residential.

Near the village there are two archaeological sites Talietumu and Tonga Toto and north of the center is also the church L'église Saint-Joseph, the oldest church in Wallis.
