= Lake Alofivai =

- Lac Alofivai (French)
- Location within Pacific Ocean
- Location: Wallis, Wallis and Futuna
- Coordinates: 13°15′42″S 176°10′17″W
- Type: Volcanic lake

Lake Alofivai (French: Lac Alofivai) is a lake on the northeastern side of Wallis (Uvea) in the Pacific. It is located off Route 1 (RT1) adjacent to the village of Alofivai. The lake is reportedly "often dry, and the bottom of the crater then affords pasture for the cows of the nearby mission schools." However, during wetter periods, the lake is populated with frogs.
