= Vaitupu, Wallis and Futuna =

Vaitupu
- Village
- Location in Wallis Island
- Coordinates: 13°13′35″S 176°11′15″W
- Country: France
- Territory: Wallis and Futuna
- Island: Wallis
- Chiefdom: Uvea
- District: Hihifo

Population (2018)
  - Total: 406
- Time zone: UTC+12

Vaitupu (French pronunciation: [vajtupu]) is a village in Wallis and Futuna. It is located in Hihifo District on the northeast coast of Wallis Island in the South Pacific. Its population according to the 2018 census was 406 people.
