= Alele =

- Village
- Location in Wallis Island
- Coordinates: 13°14′39″S 176°10′50″W
- Country: France
- Territory: Wallis and Futuna
- Island: Wallis
- Chiefdom: Uvea
- District: Hihifo

Population (2018)
  - Total: 524
- Time zone: UTC+12

Alele is a village in Wallis and Futuna. It is located in Hihifo District on the northeast coast of Wallis Island. Its population according to the 2018 census was 524 people.
