= Lycée des Îles Wallis et Futuna =

Coordinates: 13°16′29.65″S 176°11′55.2″W

Information
- Website: https://www.ac-wf.wf/Lycee-d-etat-de-Wallis-et-Futuna.html

Lycée des Îles Wallis et Futuna (LdIWF), also known as Lycée d'état de Wallis et Futuna is the public senior high school/sixth-form college of the Wallis and Futuna islands. Its campus is on Wallis.

LdIWF offers classes in French, English, Applied Arts, First Aid, Physical Sciences, Economics and Social Sciences.

Students can also undertake vocational baccalaureates in:

- Electrical Engineering
- Commerce, Accounting and Administration
- Business and Sales
- Science and Technology in Management and Administration (Baccalauréat sciences et technologies du management et de la gestion)
