= Halalo =

- Village
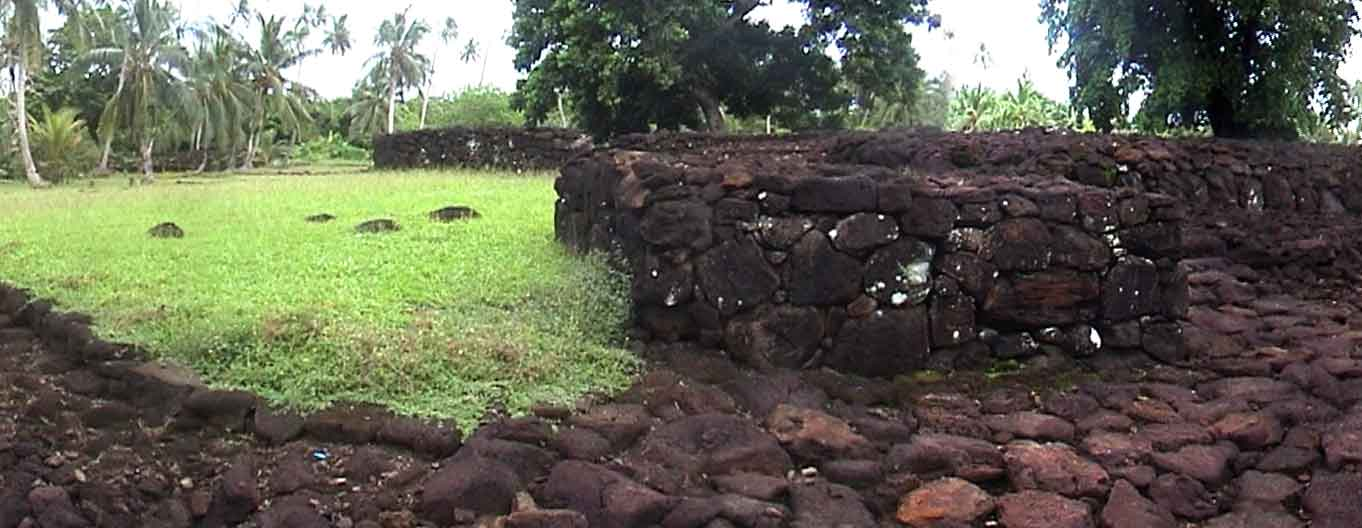
- Talietumu

- Location in Wallis Island
- Coordinates: 13°20′19″S 176°12′54″W
- Country: France
- Territory: Wallis and Futuna
- Island: Wallis
- Chiefdom: Uvea
- District: Mua

Population (2018)
  - Total: 471
- Time zone: UTC+12

Halalo is a village in Wallis and Futuna. It is located in Mua District on the southwest coast of Wallis Island. Its population according to the 2018 census was 471 people. Just to the northeast is the archeological site of Talietumu.
