= Liku, Wallis and Futuna =

Liku
- Village
- Location in Wallis Island
- Coordinates: 13°15′50″S 176°10′24″W
- Country: France
- Territory: Wallis and Futuna
- Island: Wallis
- Chiefdom: Uvea
- District: Hahake

Population (2018)
  - Total: 605
- Time zone: UTC+12

Liku is a village in Wallis and Futuna. It is located in Hahake District, near the east coast of Wallis Island. Its population according to the 2018 census was 605 people. It's the second largest town in Wallis and Futuna.
