= Mua District =

Mua Mu'a
- District
- Map of Wallis Island showing the 3 districts: Mua is located in the South
- Coordinates: 13°20′25″S 176°11′30″W
- Country: France
- Territory: Wallis and Futuna
- Island: Wallis
- Chiefdom: Uvea
- Capital: Mala'efo'ou

Area
  - Total: 26.3 km^{2} (10.2 sq mi)

Population (2018)
  - Total: 2,976
- Time zone: UTC+12
- No. of municipalities: 10

Mua (also spelled Mu'a, Uvean for "first") is one of the 5 districts of Wallis and Futuna, located in Wallis Island, in the Pacific Ocean. It is part of the Chiefdom of Uvea.

== Geography ==
Located in the southern side of the island, Mua borders with the districts of Hahake. Mala'efo'ou (formerly named Mu'a) is the administrative seat.

The district is divided into 10 municipal villages, with the combined population of 2,976.

Village	Population
Utufua	602
Halalo	471
Vaimalau	371
Lavegahau	330
Teesi	216
Malaefoou	171
Gahi	249
Tepa	270
Haatofo	197
Kolopopo	99

== See also ==
- Fineveke
