= Mala'e (Wallis) =

- Village
- Location in Wallis Island
- Coordinates: 13°14′40″S 176°11′36″W
- Country: France
- Territory: Wallis and Futuna
- Island: Wallis
- Chiefdom: Uvea
- District: Hihifo

Population (2018)
  - Total: 504
- Time zone: UTC+12

Mala'e or Mala'etoli is a village in Wallis and Futuna. It is located in Hihifo District on the southwest coast of Wallis Island. Its population according to the 2018 census was 504 people.

== See also ==
- Hihifo Airport
