= Toloke =

- Village
- Location in Futuna Island
- Coordinates: 14°14′32″S 178°10′36″W
- Country: France
- Territory: Wallis and Futuna
- Island: Futuna
- Chiefdom and District: Sigave

Population (2018)
  - Total: 172
- Time zone: UTC+12

Toloke is a village in Wallis and Futuna. It is located in Sigave District on the northwestern tip of Futuna Island. Its population according to the 2018 census was 172 people.
