= Falaleu =

- Village
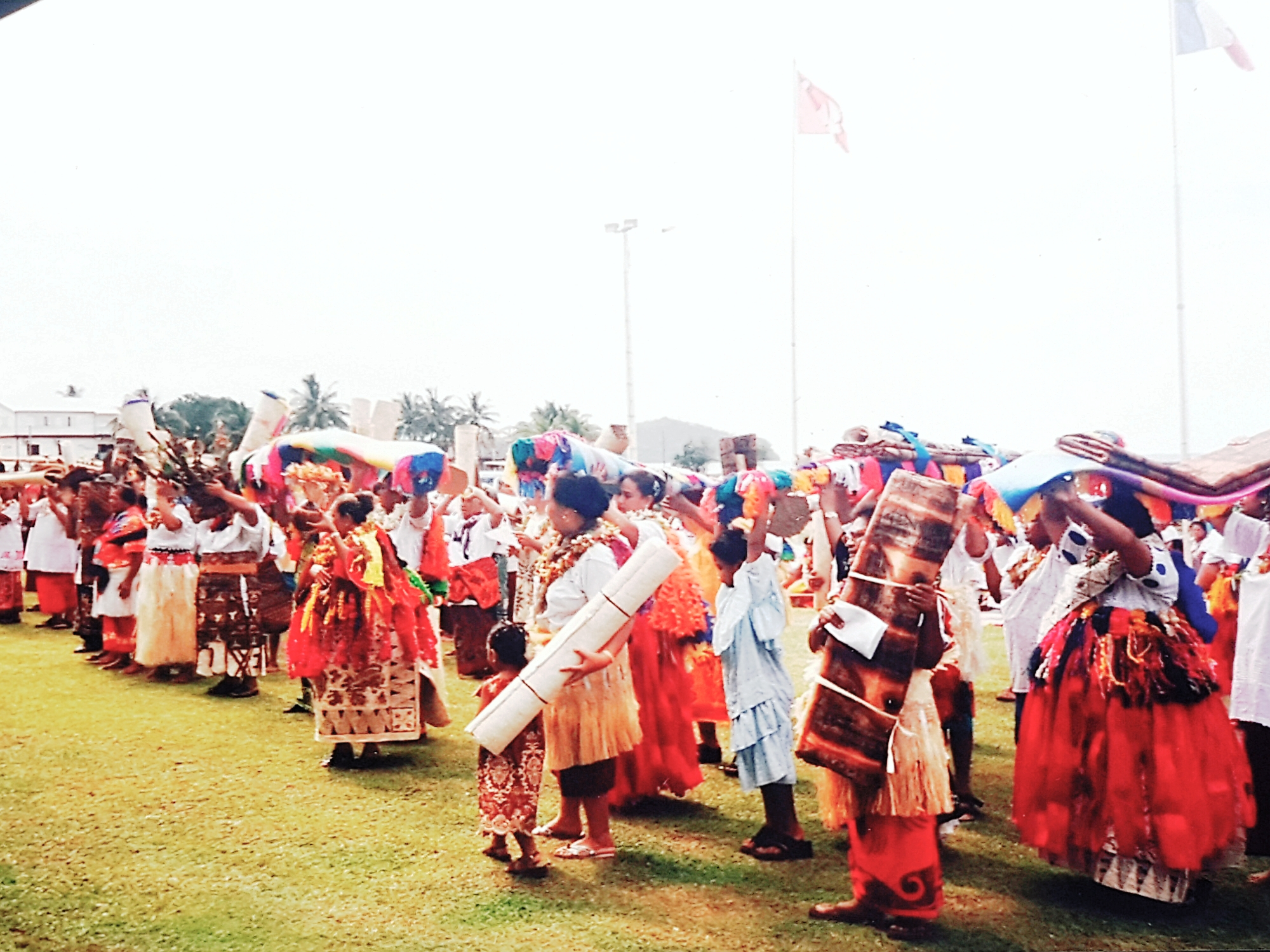
- Festival of To'okava taking place in Falaleu

- Location in Wallis Island
- Coordinates: 13°17′36″S 176°10′54″W
- Country: France
- Territory: Wallis and Futuna
- Island: Wallis
- Chiefdom: Uvea
- District: Hahake

Population (2022)
  - Total: 550
- Time zone: UTC+12

Falaleu is a village in Wallis and Futuna. It is one of 7 villages located in the Hahake District on the east coast of Wallis Island. Its population according to the 2023 census was 550 people.

== Location ==
Falaleu is on the south border of the village Mata-Utu, and on the east coast of the island. Administratively, it falls within Hahake district, one of three districts on Wallis. There are a total of 7 villages within the Hahake district, and 21 villages on Wallis overall.

== Governance ==
Falaleu is home to Fale Fonu, the traditional residence of the Fotu'atamai, the customary minister of health, justice and land disputes in the Kingdom of Uvea. The island of Wallis is ruled by a King, known as Lavelua, appointed within a Royal Family. The King is supported by a Prime Minister. The island is further divided into three districts, of which Falaleu is in Hahake. Each district is headed by a Chief and each of the 21 villages are led by village chiefs.

== Culture ==
Every year, during the Feast of the Assumption (August 15), which corresponds to the festival of the district of Hahake, the inhabitants of Falaleu bring many products to Mata-Utu that they have made and collected: crafts, fishing, agriculture. This ceremony is called to'okava. Women present their achievements, such as weaving and tapa cloths.

== Etymology ==
In the Tongan language fala means "pandanus" (a fruit) and leu means "ripe". Falaleu therefore refers to "ripe pandanus".

== Population ==
According to the 2018 census, the village had a population of 572 people. However, by 2023, this figure had dropped to 550.
