= Taoa =

- Village
- Location in Futuna Island
- Coordinates: 14°18′37″S 178°7′41″W
- Country: France
- Territory: Wallis and Futuna
- Island: Futuna
- Chiefdom and District: Alo

Population (2018)
  - Total: 480
- Time zone: UTC+12

Taoa is a village in Wallis and Futuna. It is located in Alo District on the southern coast of Futuna Island. Its population according to the 2018 census was 480 people.
