= Leava =

- Village
- Location in Futuna Island
- Coordinates: 14°17′45.96″S 178°9′30.6″W
- Country: France
- Territory: Wallis and Futuna
- Island: Futuna
- Chiefdom and District: Sigave

Population (2018)
  - Total: 322
- Time zone: UTC+12

Leava is the largest village in the chiefdom of Sigave, on the French Pacific island of Futuna, part of the Wallis and Futuna island group. It is also the administrative centre of Sigave.

== Overview ==
Leava is located on the shore of Sigave Bay in the centre of the island's west coast, and has a population of 322. This makes it the largest village in the chiefdom.
