= Mala'e (Futuna) =

- Village
- Location in Futuna Island
- Coordinates: 14°18′33.77″S 178°7′24.78″W
- Country: France
- Territory: Wallis and Futuna
- Island: Futuna
- Chiefdom and District: Alo

Population (2018)
  - Total: 168
- Time zone: UTC+12

Mala'e is a village in the chiefdom of Alo, on the French Pacific island of Futuna, which is part of the Wallis and Futuna group. It is located in the centre of the island's south coast.

According to the 2018 census, its population is 168.
