= Talietumu =

Archaeological site in Wallis and Futuna

Coordinates: 13°17′17″S 176°12′21″W

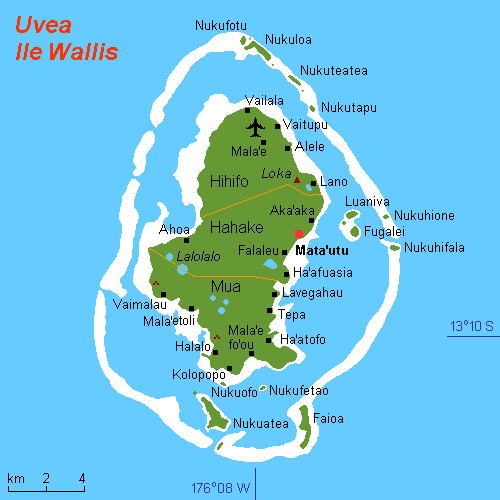
Talietumu, directly northeast of Halalo

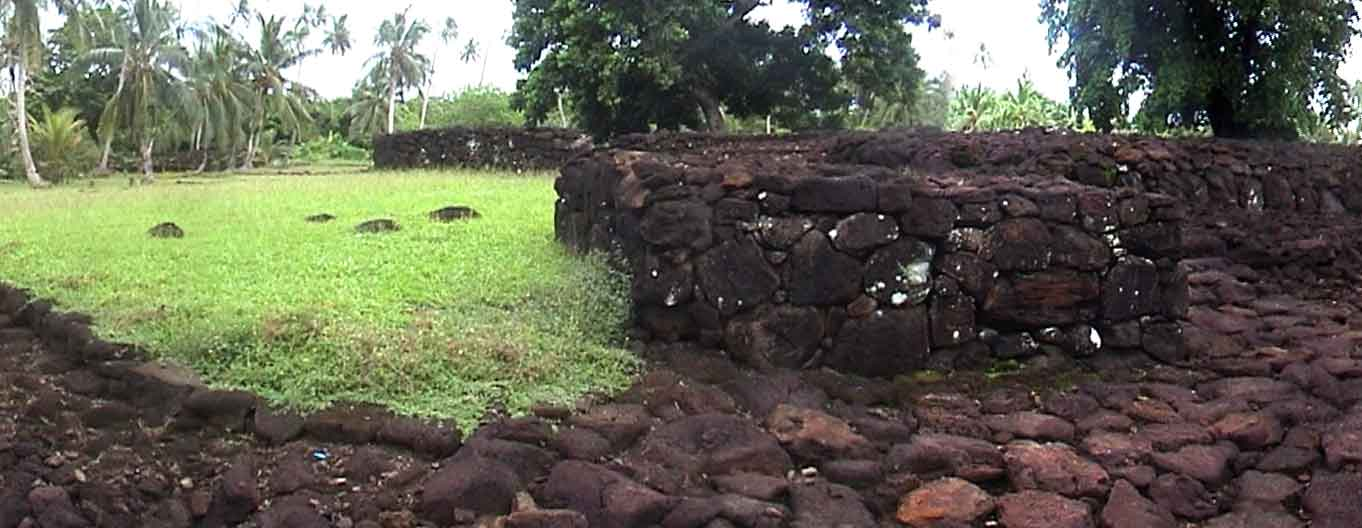
Ruins of Talietumu

Talietumu or Kolo Nui is an archaeological site in Wallis and Futuna in the southwestern part of the Pacific Ocean.

== Site ==
Talietumu is situated about 9 km (5.6 mi) southwest of the capital of Mata Utu and northeast of Halalo in the Mua District on Wallis Island (Uvea).

The site was a fortified Tongan settlement called Kolo Nui and the whole fortress is surrounded by a strong defensive wall build of basalt with several entrances. Inside the fort there are a few preserved buildings and structures, lawns and the central elevated platform called Talietumu (a Marae or Mala´e, "Sacred Place"). The platform is of circular prolonged shape upon a circular stockade base. Raised walkways paved in stone start from the mala'e and radiate outward from within the fort.

== History ==
The fort, built around 1450 during the expansion of the Tu'i Tonga Empire, was the last holdout of the Tongans on Uvea until they were defeated.

French archaeologists Daniel Frimigacci, Jean-Pierre Siorat, and Maurice Hardy of the French National Centre for Scientific Research spent several years restoring the central platform using original techniques and completed that work around 1997. The platform now measures about five metres (16 ft) in height and about 80 metres (260 ft) in length.

Today the ruins of the fortress are a popular tourist attraction.
