= Lake Lalolalo =

Volcanic crater lake in Wallis

Lake Lalolalo Lac Lalolalo
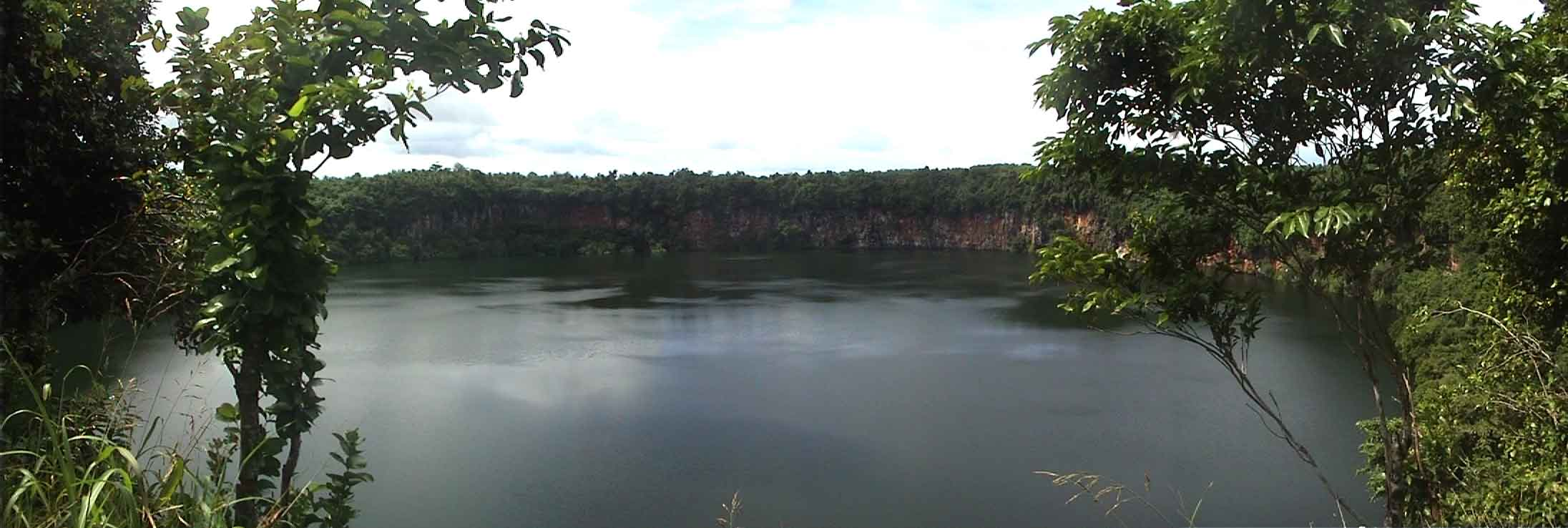

- Location within Pacific Ocean

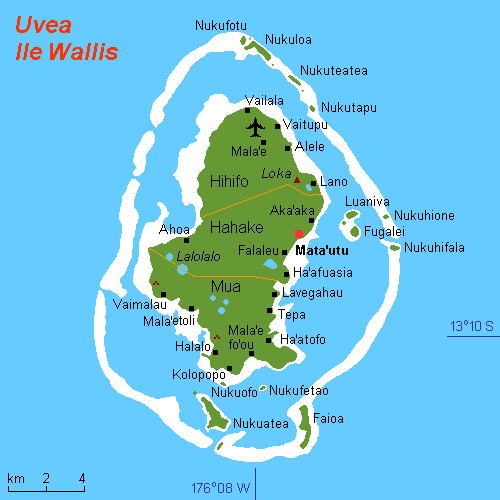
- Wallis map showing the lake at the left-middle of the island
- Location: Wallis, Wallis and Futuna
- Coordinates: 13°18′0″S 176°14′2″W
- Surface area: 15.2 ha (38 acres)
- Average depth: 88.5 m (290 ft)

Lake Lalolalo (French: Lac Lalolalo) is a volcanic crater lake surrounded by jungle, in the southwest of the island of Wallis (Uvea) in the Pacific Ocean. The largest lake on the island, it lies off Route 1 between the coastal village of Mala'etoli and Ahoa. A small lake, Lake Lano, lies just to the northwest.

== Background and history ==
The lake, almost a perfect circle and the largest of several on the island, is important to local mythology of Wallis and Futuna and to historical disputes over territory. The lake was also mentioned in Father Joseph Henquel's history. There is a rumor that the US military dumped equipment in the lake at the end of World War II. Scuba dives into the lake have found various calibers of dumped World War II-era ammunition.

== Description ==
Lonely Planet says of it, "Lake Lalolalo is the most spectacular of the Wallis crater lakes. The eerie lake is an almost perfect circle with sheer rocky cliffs falling 30m (98ft) down to the inky, 80m (262ft) deep waters." The lake is also described as "circular, with vertical red walls 30 metres high, which make the pea-green water almost inaccessible" Others claim its maximum depth is a little less at 76 metres. The surrounding jungle is inhabited by tropical birds and flying foxes which regularly fly low over the lake. Lake Lalolalo is home to a population of eels, which many conservationists have been concerned with due to the lake's inaccessibility.
