= Wallis and Futuna =

Overseas collectivity of France

Wallis and Futuna Wallis-et-Futuna (French) ʻUvea mo Futuna (Wallisian and Futunan)
- Overseas collectivity of France
- Territory of the Wallis and Futuna Islands; Territoire des îles Wallis-et-Futuna (French)
- Flag (unofficial) Coat of arms
- Motto: "Liberté, égalité, fraternité" (French) (English: "Liberty, equality, fraternity")
- Anthem: La Marseillaise ("The Marseillaise")
- Location of Wallis and Futuna

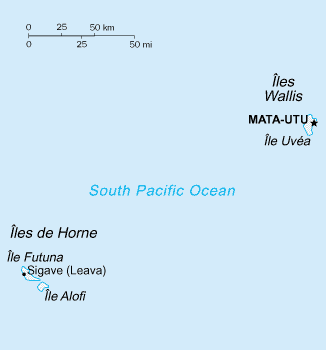
- Sovereign state: France
- Protectorate over Wallis: 5 April 1887
- Protectorate over Alo and Sigave: 16 February 1888
- Separation from New Caledonia: 29 July 1961
- Current status: 28 March 2003
- Capital and largest city: Mata Utu; 13°17′S 176°11′W
- Official languages: French
- Common languages: Wallisian; Futunan
- Demonym(s): Wallisian; Futunan
- Government: Devolved parliamentary dependency
  - President of France: Emmanuel Macron
  - Administrator Superior: Hervé Jonathan
  - Assembly President: Munipoese Muli'aka'aka
  - King of Uvea: Patalione Kanimoa
  - King of Alo: Lino Leleivai
  - King of Sigave: Eufenio Takala
- Legislature: Territorial Assembly

French Parliament
  - Senate: 1 senator (of 348)
  - National Assembly: 1 seat (of 577)

Area
  - Total: 142.42 km^{2} (54.99 sq mi)
  - Water (%): negligible
- Highest elevation: 524 m (1,719 ft)

Population
  - 2023 census: 11,151 (not ranked)
  - Density: 78.3/km^{2} (202.8/sq mi) (not ranked)
- GDP (nominal): 2019 estimate
  - Total: US$212 million
  - Per capita: US$18,360
- Currency: CFP franc (₣) (XPF)
- Time zone: UTC+12:00
- Driving side: Right
- Calling code: +681
- INSEE code: 986
- ISO 3166 code: WF; FR-WF
- Internet TLD: .wf and .fr

Wallis and Futuna, officially the Territory of the Wallis and Futuna Islands (Note: French: Wallis-et-Futuna [walis e futuna] or Territoire des îles Wallis-et-Futuna, Fakauvea and Fakafutuna: ʻUvea mo Futuna) (/ˈwɒlɪs ... fuːˈtuːnə/), is a French island collectivity in the South Pacific, situated between Tuvalu to the northwest, Fiji to the southwest, Tonga to the southeast, Samoa to the east, and Tokelau to the northeast.

Mata Utu is its capital and largest city. Wallis and Futuna is associated with the European Union as an overseas country and territory (OCT). The territory's land area is 142.42 km^{2} (54.99 sq mi). It had a population of 11,151 at the July 2023 census (down from 14,944 at the 2003 census). The territory is made up of three main volcanic tropical islands and a number of tiny islets. It is divided into two island groups that lie about 260 km (160 mi) apart: the Wallis Islands (also known as Uvea) in the northeast; and the Hoorn Islands (also known as the Futuna Islands) in the southwest, including Futuna Island proper and the mostly uninhabited Alofi Island.

Since 28 March 2003, Wallis and Futuna has been a French overseas collectivity (collectivité d'outre-mer, or COM). Between 1961 and 2003, it had the status of a French overseas territory (territoire d'outre-mer, or TOM). Its official name did not change with the change in its status.

== History ==
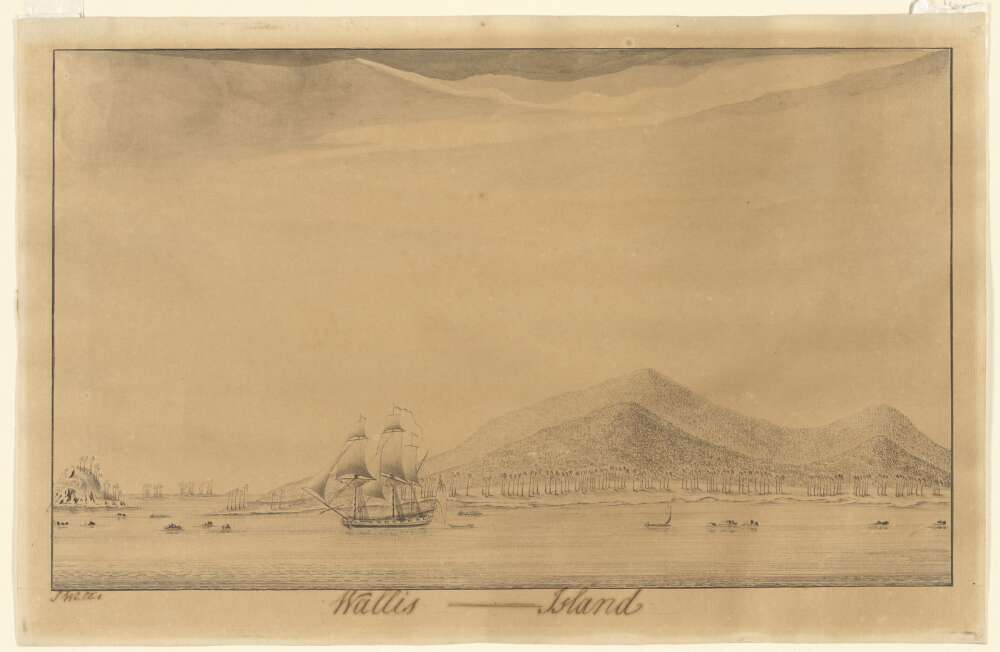
Drawing of Wallis Island by Captain Samuel Wallis in 1767

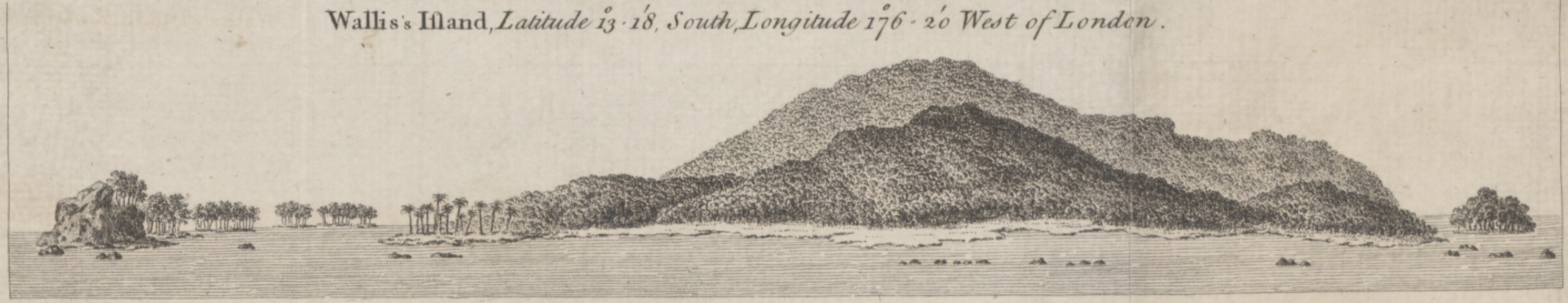
Coastal view of Wallis island by Captain James Cook in 1773

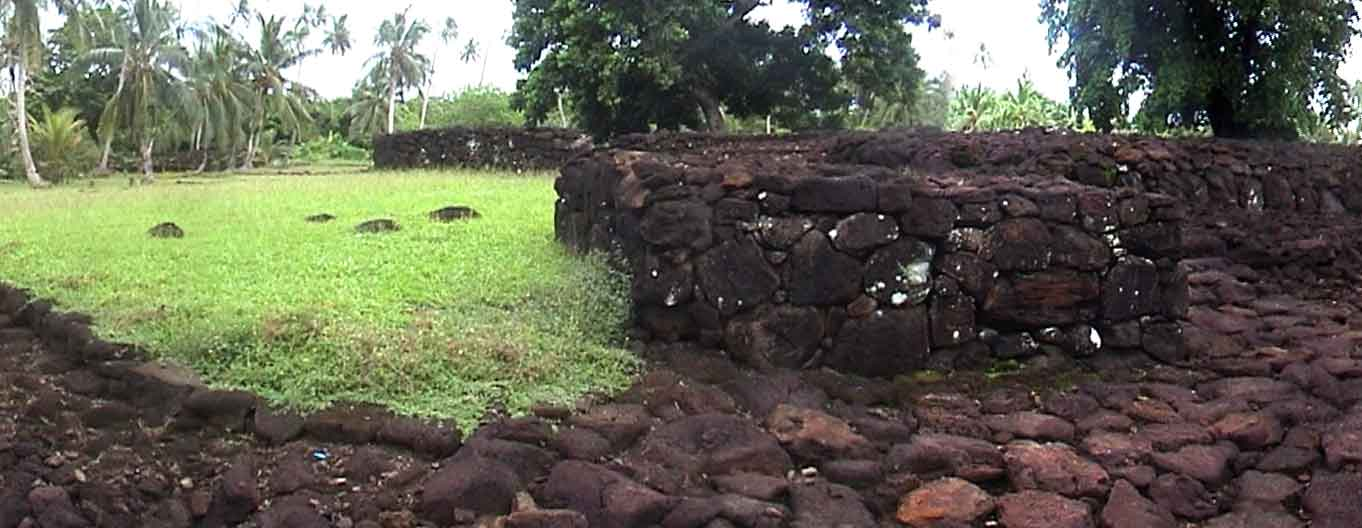
Ruins of the Talietumu fort

=== Early humans ===
The earliest signs of human habitation on these islands are artifacts characteristic of the Lapita culture, dating roughly to between 850 and 800 BCE. The islands served as natural stopover points for boat traffic, mostly between Fiji and Samoa. During Tongan invasions in the 15th and 16th centuries, the islands defended themselves with varying levels of resistance, but also accepted varying degrees of assimilation. Futuna retained more of its pre-Tongan cultural features, while Wallis underwent greater fundamental changes in its society, language, and culture. The original inhabitants built forts and other identifiable structures on the islands (many of which are in ruins), some of which are still partially intact. Oral history and archaeological evidence suggests that the Tongan invaders re-occupied and modified some of these structures. The oral history also preserves a cultural memory of relationships between Samoa and Futuna that are so longstanding that they are described in the islanders' origin stories.

=== European settlements ===
Futuna was first put on European maps by Willem Schouten and Jacob Le Maire, during their circumnavigation of the globe, in 1616. They named the islands of Futuna "Hoornse Eylanden", after the Dutch town of Hoorn where they hailed from. This was later translated into French, as "Isles de Horne". The Wallis Islands are named after the British explorer Samuel Wallis, who sailed past them in 1767, after being the first European to visit Tahiti. The French were the first Europeans to settle in the territory, with the arrival of French missionaries in 1837, who converted the population to Roman Catholicism. Pierre Chanel, canonized in 1954, is a major patron saint of the island of Futuna and of the region.

On 5 April 1842, the missionaries asked for the protection of France, after the uprising of part of the local population. On 5 April 1887, the queen of Uvea (of the traditional chiefdom of Wallis) signed a treaty, officially establishing a French protectorate. The kings of Sigave and Alo (on the islands of Futuna and Alofi) also signed a treaty establishing a French protectorate, on 16 February 1888. From that moment, the islands were officially under the authority of the French colony of New Caledonia.

In 1917, the three traditional kingdoms of Uvea, Sigave, and Alo were annexed by France, integrated into the colony of Wallis and Futuna, and remained under the authority of the colony of New Caledonia.

=== World War II ===
During World War II, the islands' administration was briefly pro-Vichy, until a Free French corvette from New Caledonia deposed the regime, on 26 May 1942. Units of the US Marine Corps later landed on Wallis, on 29 May 1942.

=== Overseas territory ===
In 1959, the inhabitants of the islands voted to become a separate French overseas territory, effective since 29 July 1961, thus ending their subordination to New Caledonia.

In 2005, the 50th king of Uvea, Tomasi Kulimoetoke II, faced being deposed after giving sanctuary to his grandson who was convicted of manslaughter. The king claimed his grandson should be judged by tribal law rather than by the French penal system. As a result, there were riots in the streets involving the king's supporters, who were victorious over attempts to replace the king. Two years later, Tomasi Kulimoetoke died on 7 May 2007. There was a six-month period of mourning, during which mentioning a successor was forbidden. On 25 July 2008, Kapeliele Faupala was installed as king despite protests from some of the royal clans. He was deposed in 2014. A new king, Patalione Kanimoa, was eventually installed in Uvea in 2016; Lino Leleivai in Alo on Futuna succeeded after Filipo Katoa abdicated, and Eufenio Takala succeeded Polikalepo Kolivai in Sigave. The French president at the time, François Hollande, attended the installation ceremony.

== Governance and law ==
The territory is divided into three traditional kingdoms (royaumes coutumiers): Uvea, on the island of Wallis, Sigave, on the western part of the island of Futuna, and Alo, on the eastern part of the island of Futuna and on the uninhabited island of Alofi (only Uvea is further subdivided, into three districts):

Kingdom District	Capital	Area (km^{2})	Population 2003 census	Population 2018 census	Population 2023 census	2003–2018 evolution	Villages (Note: Refers to villages with municipal status.)
Wallis Island
Uvea (Wallis)	Mata Utu	77.5	10,071	8,333	8,088	▼ −17.3%	21
Hihifo ("west")	Vaitupu	23.4	2,422	1,942	1,855	▼ −19.8%	5
Hahake ("east")	Mata Utu	27.8	3,950	3,415	3,343	▼ −13.5%	6
Mu'a ("first")	Mala'efo'ou (Note: Formerly called Mua.)	26.3	3,699	2,976	2,890	▼ −19.5%	10
Futuna (Note: Alofi is virtually uninhabited; administratively it falls under Alo.)
Sigave (Singave)	Leava	16.75	1,880	1,275	1,188	▼ −32.2%	6
Alo	Mala'e	47.5	2,993	1,950	1,875	▼ −34.8%	9
Total Futuna	Leava	64.25	4,873	3,225	3,063	▼ −33.8%	15
Overall total	Mata Utu	142.42	14,944	11,558	11,151	▼ −22.7%	36

The capital of the collectivity is Mata Utu on the island of Uvéa, the most populous of the Wallis Islands. As an overseas collectivity of France, it is governed under the French constitution of 28 September 1958, and has universal suffrage for those over 18 years of age. The French president is elected by popular vote for a five-year term; the high administrator is appointed by the French president on the advice of the French Ministry of the Interior and heads the Territory Government; the president of the Territorial Assembly is elected by the members of the assembly. The most recent election was held on 20 March 2022.

As of 2023, the head of state is President Emmanuel Macron of France, as represented by Administrator-Superior Hervé Jonathan. The president of the Territorial Assembly has been Munipoese Muliʻakaʻaka since March 2022. The Council of the Territory consists of three kings (monarchs of the three pre-colonial kingdoms) and three members appointed by the high administrator on the advice of the Territorial Assembly.

The legislative branch consists of the unicameral 20-member Territorial Assembly or Assemblée territoriale. Its members are elected by popular vote, and serve five-year terms. Wallis and Futuna elects one senator to the French Senate and one deputy to the French National Assembly.

Criminal justice is generally governed by French law and administered by a tribunal of first resort in Mata Utu; appeals from that tribunal are decided by the Court of Appeal in Nouméa, New Caledonia. However, in non-criminal cases (civil-law disputes), the three traditional kingdoms administer justice according to customary law.

The territory participates in the Franc Zone, and is both a permanent member of the Secretariat of the Pacific Community and an observer at the Pacific Islands Forum.

== Geography and climate ==
Location map of Wallis and Futuna in relation to France.

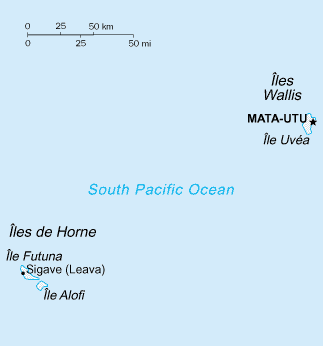
Map of the territory of Wallis and Futuna

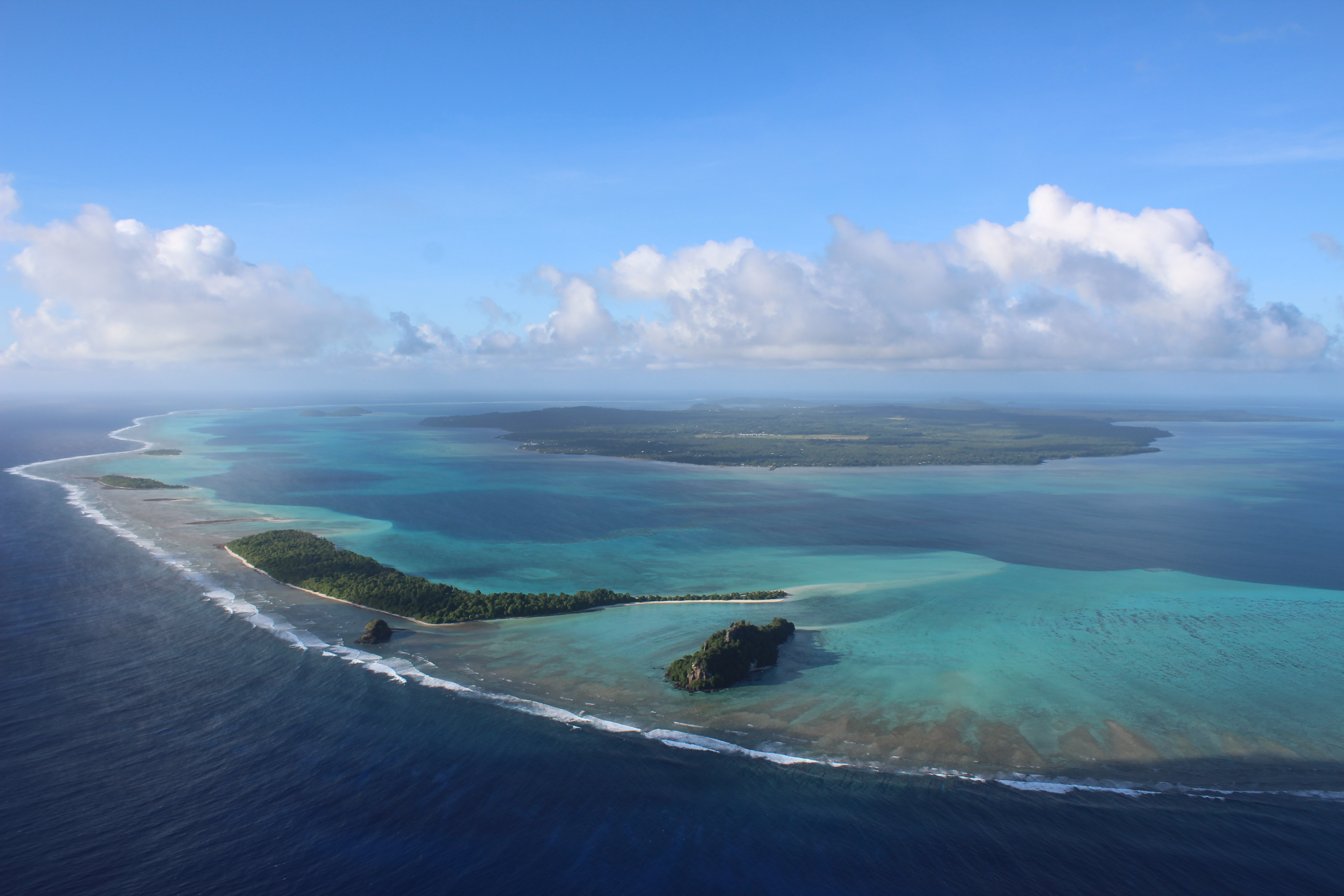
Aerial view of Wallis Island (Uvea)

Wallis and Futuna is located at 13°18′S 176°12′W, 360 km (220 mi) west of Samoa and 480 km (300 mi) northeast of Fiji — about one-third of the way northeast from New Zealand towards Hawaii.

The territory includes the island of Uvéa (also called Wallis), which is the most populous; the island of Futuna; the virtually uninhabited island of Alofi; and 20 uninhabited islets. The total area of the territory is 274 km^{2} (106 sq mi), with 129 km (80 mi) of coastline. The highest point in the territory is Mont Puke, on the island of Futuna, at 524 m (1,719 ft).

The islands have a hot, rainy season from November to April, when tropical cyclones passing over them cause storms. Then they have a cool, dry season from May to October, caused by the southeast trade winds that predominate during those months. The average annual rainfall is between 2,500 and 3,000 millimeters (98 and 118 inches), and rain is likely on at least 260 days per year. The average humidity is 80%. The average annual temperature is 26.6 °C (79.9 °F), rarely falling below 24.0 °C (75.2 °F); during the rainy season, it ranges between 28.0 and 32.0 °C (82.4 and 89.6 °F).

Only 5% of the islands' land area consists of arable land; permanent crops cover another 20%. Deforestation is a serious problem: Only small portions of the original forests remain, largely because the inhabitants use wood as their main fuel source, and, as a result, the mountainous terrain of Futuna is particularly susceptible to erosion. The island of Alofi lacks natural freshwater resources, so it has no permanent settlements.

Volcanic activity during the mid-Pleistocene created numerous volcanic crater lakes on Uvea (Wallis Island). The names of some of them are: Lalolalo, Lano, Lanutavake, Lanutuli, Lanumaha, Kikila, and Alofivai.

Wallis and Futuna is part of the Fiji tropical moist forests terrestrial ecoregion.

Climate data for Mata Utu (Köppen Af)
Month	Jan	Feb	Mar	Apr	May	Jun	Jul	Aug	Sep	Oct	Nov	Dec	Year
Mean daily maximum °C (°F)	30.3 (86.5)	30.4 (86.7)	30.3 (86.5)	30.3 (86.5)	29.7 (85.5)	29.4 (84.9)	28.9 (84.0)	29.1 (84.4)	29.3 (84.7)	29.5 (85.1)	29.9 (85.8)	30.3 (86.5)	29.8 (85.6)
Daily mean °C (°F)	27.4 (81.3)	27.5 (81.5)	27.4 (81.3)	27.4 (81.3)	27.0 (80.6)	26.9 (80.4)	26.5 (79.7)	26.6 (79.9)	26.8 (80.2)	26.9 (80.4)	27.1 (80.8)	27.4 (81.3)	27.1 (80.7)
Mean daily minimum °C (°F)	24.4 (75.9)	24.5 (76.1)	24.5 (76.1)	24.4 (75.9)	24.3 (75.7)	24.4 (75.9)	24.0 (75.2)	24.1 (75.4)	24.2 (75.6)	24.2 (75.6)	24.3 (75.7)	24.4 (75.9)	24.3 (75.8)
Average precipitation mm (inches)	381.4 (15.02)	301.3 (11.86)	373.5 (14.70)	287.6 (11.32)	258.4 (10.17)	159.3 (6.27)	186.5 (7.34)	149.9 (5.90)	221.1 (8.70)	330.4 (13.01)	322.9 (12.71)	350.3 (13.79)	3,322.6 (130.79)
Average rainy days	20	19	19	16	16	14	14	14	14	19	17	19	201
Source: Weatherbase

Climate data for Hihifo District (Köppen Af)
Month	Jan	Feb	Mar	Apr	May	Jun	Jul	Aug	Sep	Oct	Nov	Dec	Year
Record high °C (°F)	33.0 (91.4)	33.0 (91.4)	32.8 (91.0)	33.4 (92.1)	32.8 (91.0)	32.1 (89.8)	31.4 (88.5)	31.5 (88.7)	32.0 (89.6)	31.9 (89.4)	33.1 (91.6)	32.7 (90.9)	33.4 (92.1)
Mean daily maximum °C (°F)	30.7 (87.3)	30.8 (87.4)	30.9 (87.6)	30.8 (87.4)	30.4 (86.7)	29.8 (85.6)	29.4 (84.9)	29.6 (85.3)	29.9 (85.8)	30.1 (86.2)	30.5 (86.9)	30.7 (87.3)	30.3 (86.5)
Daily mean °C (°F)	27.9 (82.2)	27.9 (82.2)	27.9 (82.2)	28.0 (82.4)	27.7 (81.9)	27.5 (81.5)	27.0 (80.6)	27.1 (80.8)	27.3 (81.1)	27.4 (81.3)	27.6 (81.7)	27.9 (82.2)	27.6 (81.7)
Mean daily minimum °C (°F)	25.0 (77.0)	25.0 (77.0)	25.0 (77.0)	25.1 (77.2)	25.0 (77.0)	25.1 (77.2)	24.6 (76.3)	24.6 (76.3)	24.8 (76.6)	24.7 (76.5)	24.8 (76.6)	25.0 (77.0)	24.9 (76.8)
Record low °C (°F)	19.9 (67.8)	20.5 (68.9)	19.6 (67.3)	19.3 (66.7)	18.5 (65.3)	19.7 (67.5)	18.0 (64.4)	18.4 (65.1)	19.2 (66.6)	19.5 (67.1)	20.5 (68.9)	19.5 (67.1)	18.0 (64.4)
Average precipitation mm (inches)	395.2 (15.56)	332.1 (13.07)	309.3 (12.18)	289.1 (11.38)	223.8 (8.81)	179.7 (7.07)	213.4 (8.40)	165.3 (6.51)	219.8 (8.65)	297.8 (11.72)	306.2 (12.06)	347.0 (13.66)	3,278.7 (129.08)
Average precipitation days (≥ 1.0 mm)	20.2	18.1	19.3	17.4	16.7	14.8	15.6	14.5	15.4	17.7	18.0	19.9	207.6
Mean monthly sunshine hours	170.9	161.4	175.4	185.9	180.8	167.9	179.8	192.5	191.0	187.4	181.6	175.2	2,149.9
Source: Météo France

== Islands ==
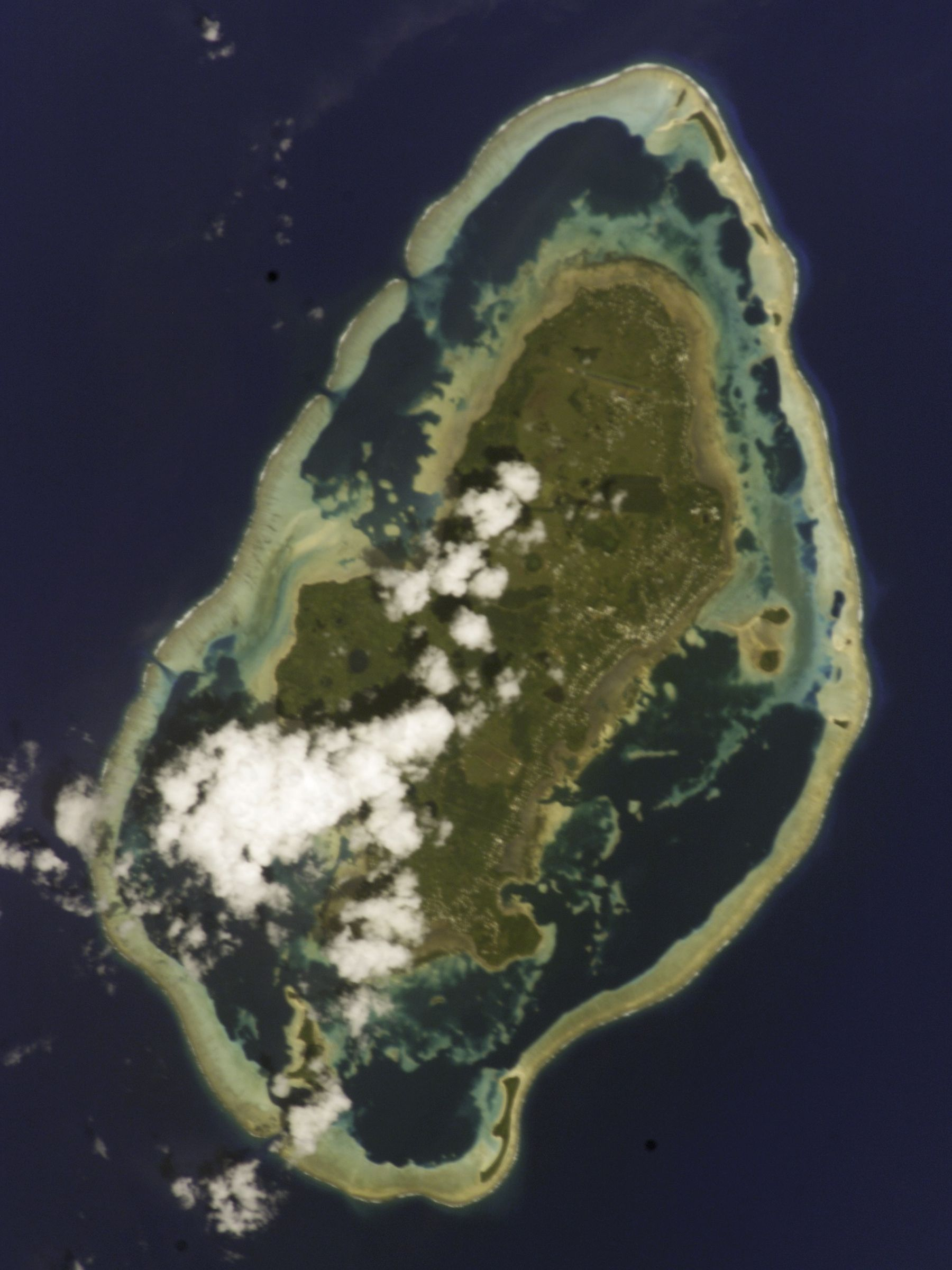
Satellite image of Wallis Island

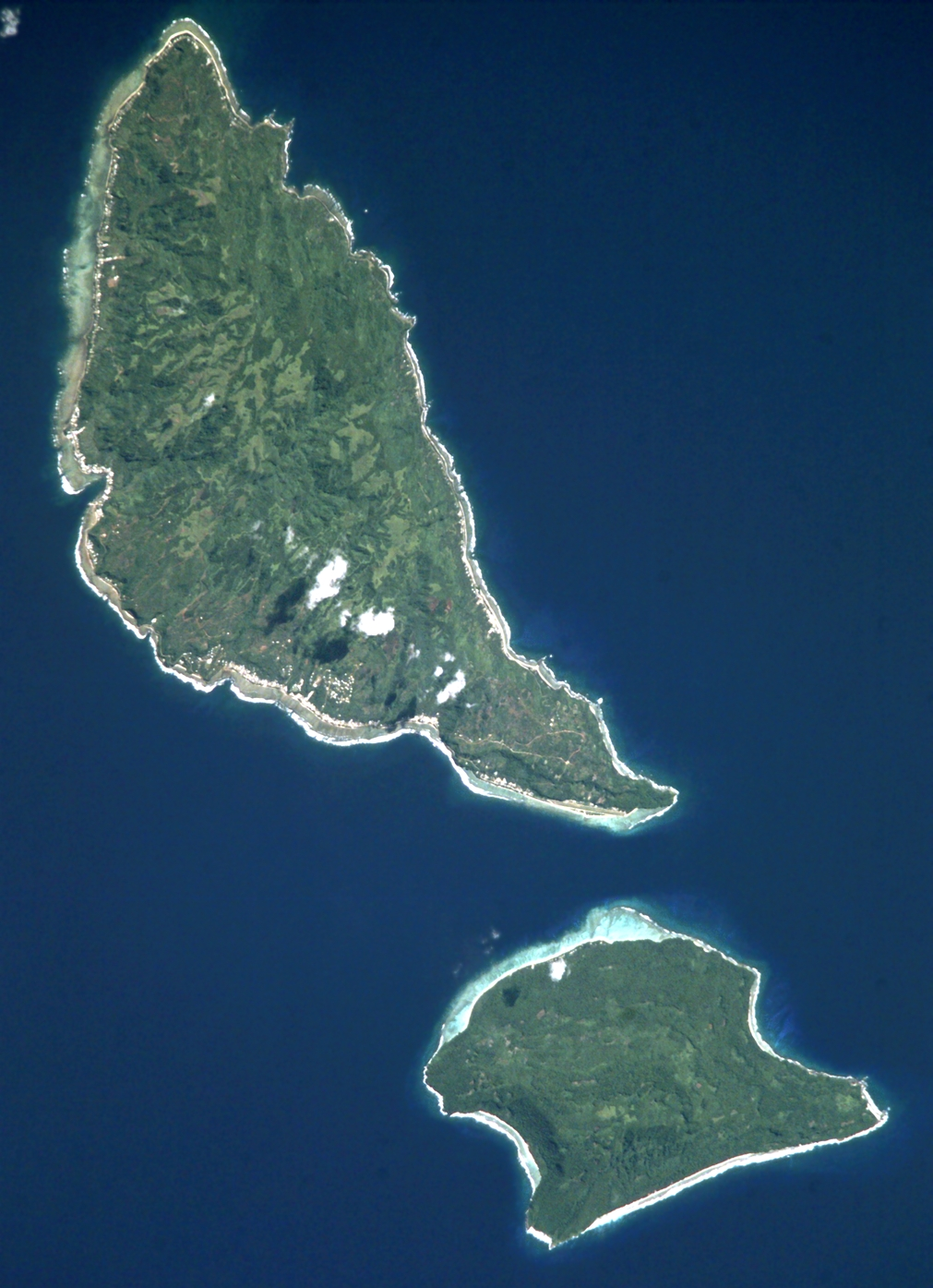
Satellite image of Futuna Island and Alofi Island, also known as the Hoorn Islands

Island	Capital	Other villages	Area (km^{2})	Population
Wallis and Futuna	Mata Utu	Leava, Vaitupu, Alele, Liku, Falaleu, Utufua	142.42	11,558
Hoorn Islands (Futuna and Alofi islands)	Leava	Fiua, Nuku, Taoa, Mala'e, Ono, Vele	64.1	3,239
Alofi			17.8	0
Futuna	Leava	Toloke, Fiua, Vaisei, Nuku, Taoa, Mala'e, Kolopelu, Ono, Kolia, Vele, Kolotai, Laloua, Poi, Tamana, Tuatafa, Tavai	46.3	3,225
Faioa			0.68	0
Fenuafo'ou			0.03	0
Fugalei			0.18	0
Ilot St. Christophe	Chappel St. Christophe		0.03	0
Luaniva			0.18	0
Nukuatea			0.74	0
Nukufotu			0.04	0
Nukuhifala	Nukuhifala		0.067	4
Nukuhione			0.02	0
Nukuloa	Nukuloa		0.35	10
Nukutapu			0.05	0
Nukuteatea			0.1	0
Other	Nukuato		0.043	0
Wallis Islands	Mata Utu	Vaitupu, Alele, Liku, Falaleu, Utufua, Mala'efo'ou, Mala'e	75.9	8,333
Wallis (island)	Mata Utu	Vaitupu, Alele, Liku, Falaleu, Utufua, Mala'efo'ou, Mala'e	75.8	8,333
Tekaviki			0.01	0
Other			0	0
Wallis and Futuna	Mata Utu	Leava, Vaitupu, Alele, Liku, Falaleu, Utufua	142.42	11,558

== Economy ==
The GDP of Wallis and Futuna in 2019 was US$212 million (at market exchange rates). The territory's economy consists mostly of traditional subsistence agriculture, with about 80% of the labor force earning its livelihood from agriculture (coconuts and vegetables), livestock (mostly pigs), and fishing. About 4% of the population is employed in government. Additional revenue comes from French government subsidies, licensing of fishing rights to Japan and South Korea, import taxes, and remittances from expatriate workers in New Caledonia, French Polynesia, and France. Industries include copra, handicrafts, fishing, and lumber. Agricultural products include coconuts, breadfruit, yams, taro, bananas, pigs, and fish. Exports include copra, chemicals, and fish.

There is a single bank in the territory, Banque de Wallis-et-Futuna, established in 1991. It is a subsidiary of BNP Paribas. There had previously been a branch of Banque Indosuez at Mata Utu. It had opened in 1977, but was closed in 1989, leaving the territory without any bank for two years.

== Demographics ==
=== Population ===
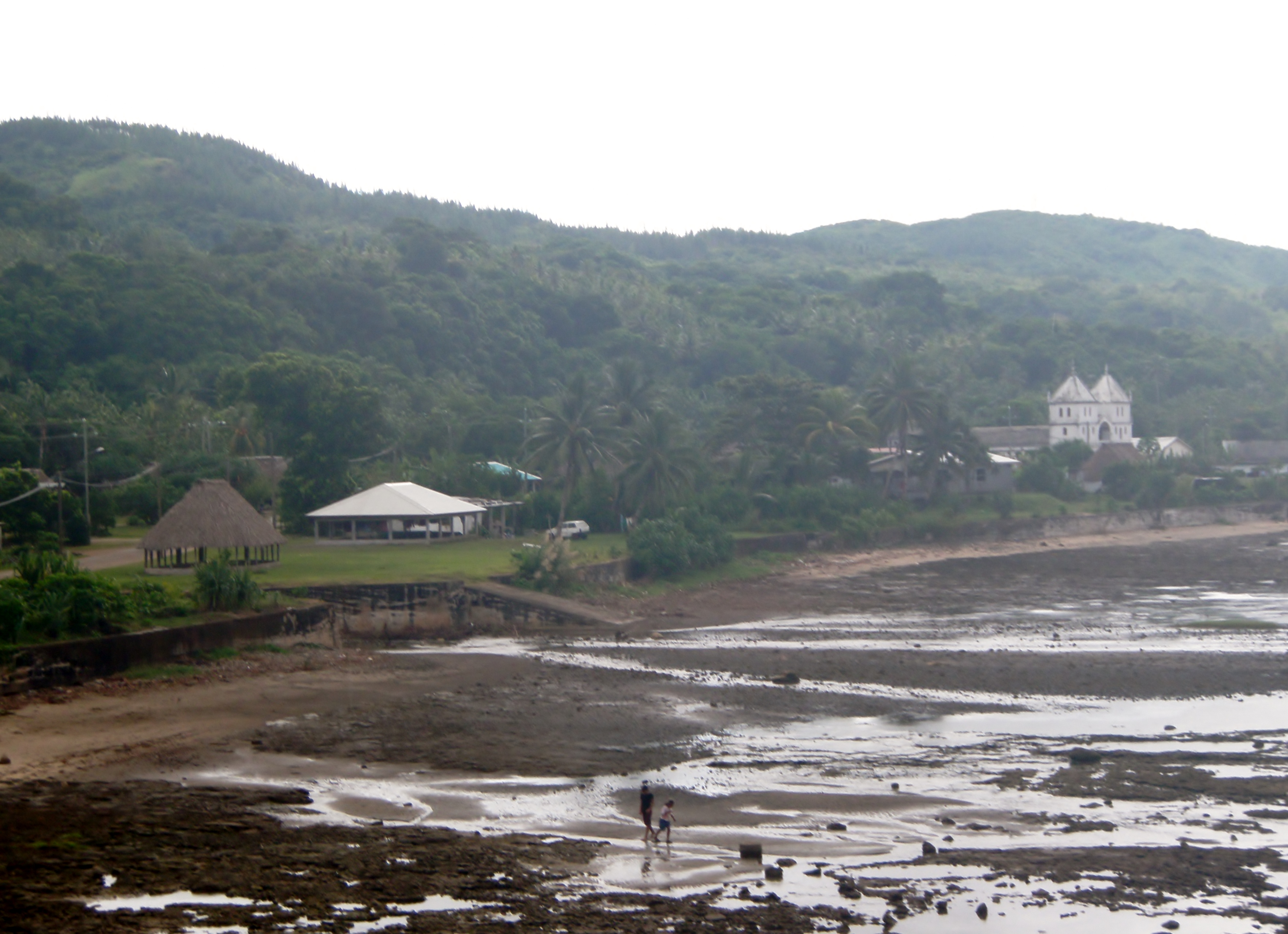
Futuna Island

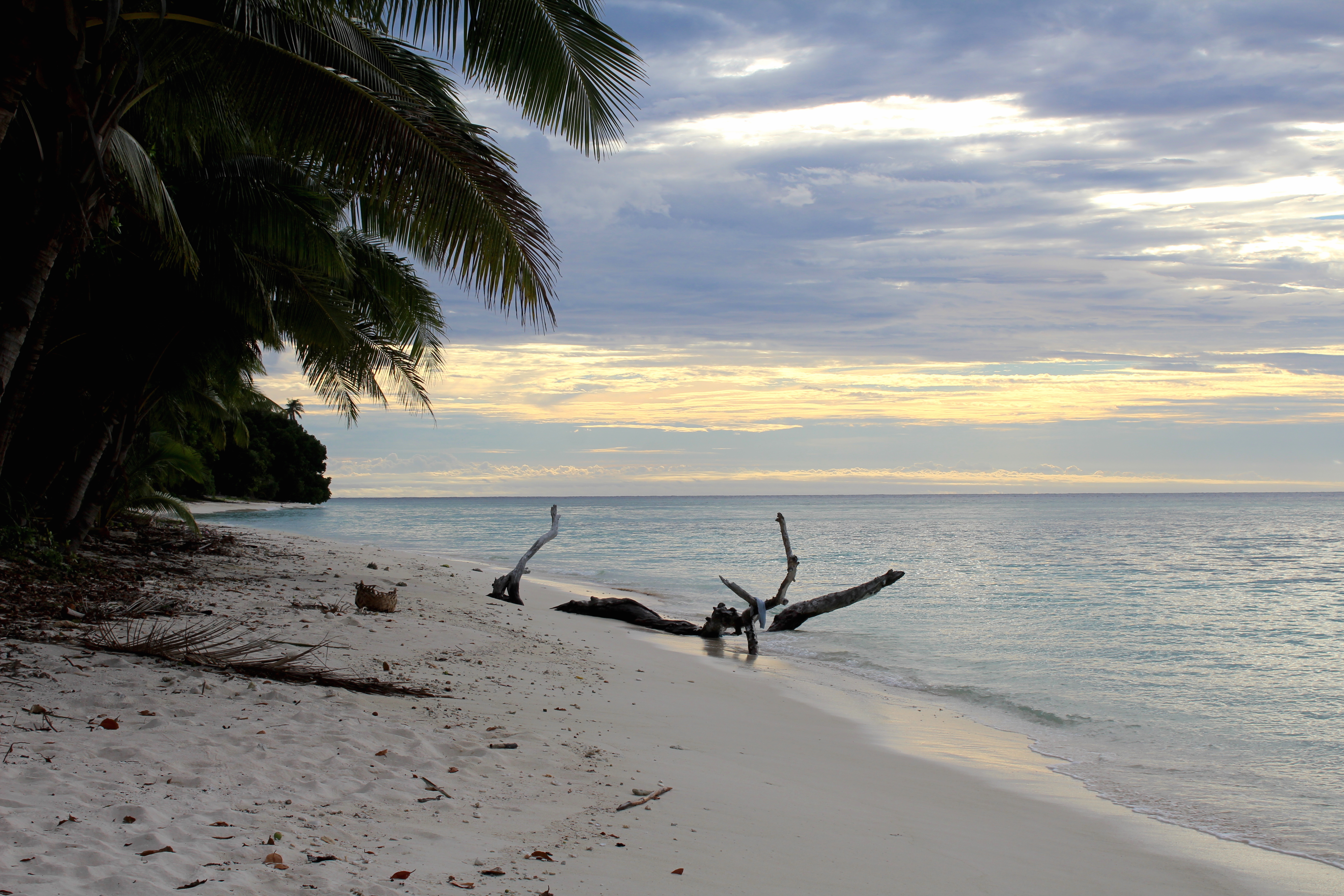
Alofi Island

The total population of the territory at the July 2023 census was 11,151 (72.5% on the island of Wallis, 27.5% on the island of Futuna), down from 14,944 at the July 2003 census. The vast majority of the population are of Polynesian ethnicity, with a small minority who were born in Metropolitan France or are of French European descent.

Lack of economic opportunities has, since the 1950s, been impelling many young Wallisians and Futunians to migrate to the more prosperous French territory of New Caledonia, where, as French citizens, they are legally entitled to settle and work. Since the mid-2000s, emigration has surged in response to political tensions on the main island of Wallis (Uvea), that have arisen from a feud between rival aristocratic clans, who are supporting competing kings. Emigrants have begun settling, not only in New Caledonia, but also much farther away, in Metropolitan France. At the 2019 New Caledonian census, 22,520 residents of New Caledonia (whether born in New Caledonia or in Wallis and Futuna) reported their ethnicity as "Wallisian and Futunian". This is almost double the total population of Wallis and Futuna.

==== Historical population ====
1969	1976	1983	1990	1996	2003	2008	2013	2018	2023
8,546	9,192	12,408	13,705	14,166	14,944	13,484	12,197	11,558	11,151
Official figures from past censuses.

=== Languages ===
Percentages of speakers of each language
Language most spoken at home in Wallis and Futuna	2008	2013	2018	2023	Change (2018 – 2023)
Wallisian	60.15	58.14	59.15	57.32	1.83
Futunan	29.89	28.40	27.89	28.20	0.31
French	9.71	13.08	12.72	14.29	1.57
Other	0.25	0.38	0.24	0.19	0.05

Languages spoken at home in Wallis and Futuna (2018 Census)
1. Wallisian (59.1%)
2. Futunan (27.9%)
3. French (12.7%)

According to the 2018 census, among people 14 years and older, 59.1% reported Wallisian as the language they spoke the most at home (down from 60.2% in 2008), 27.9% reported Futunan (down from 29.9% in 2008), and 12.7% reported French (up from 9.7% in 2008). On Wallis Island, the languages most spoken at home were Wallisian (82.2%, down from 86.1% in 2008), French (15.6%, up from 12.1% in 2008), and Futunan (1.9%, up from 1.5% in 2008). On Futuna, the languages most spoken at home were Futunan (94.5%, down from 94.9% in 2008), French (5.3%, up from 4.2% in 2008), and Wallisian (0.2%, down from 0.8% in 2008).

At the 2018 census, 90.5% of people 14 y/o and older could speak, read and write either Wallisian or Futunan (up from 88.5% at the 2008 census), and 7.2% had no knowledge of either Wallisian or Futunan (same percentage as at the 2008 census).

Among those 14 y/o and older, 84.2% could speak, read and write French in 2018 (up from 78.2% at the 2008 census), and 11.8% reported that they had no knowledge of French (down from 17.3% at the 2008 census). On Wallis Island, 85.1% of people age 14 or older could speak, read and write French (up from 81.1% at the 2008 census), and 10.9% reported that they had no knowledge of French (down from 14.3% at the 2008 census). On Futuna, 81.9% of people age 14 or older could speak, read and write French (up from 71.6% at the 2008 census), and 14.0% had no knowledge of French (down from 24.3% at the 2008 census).

=== Religion ===
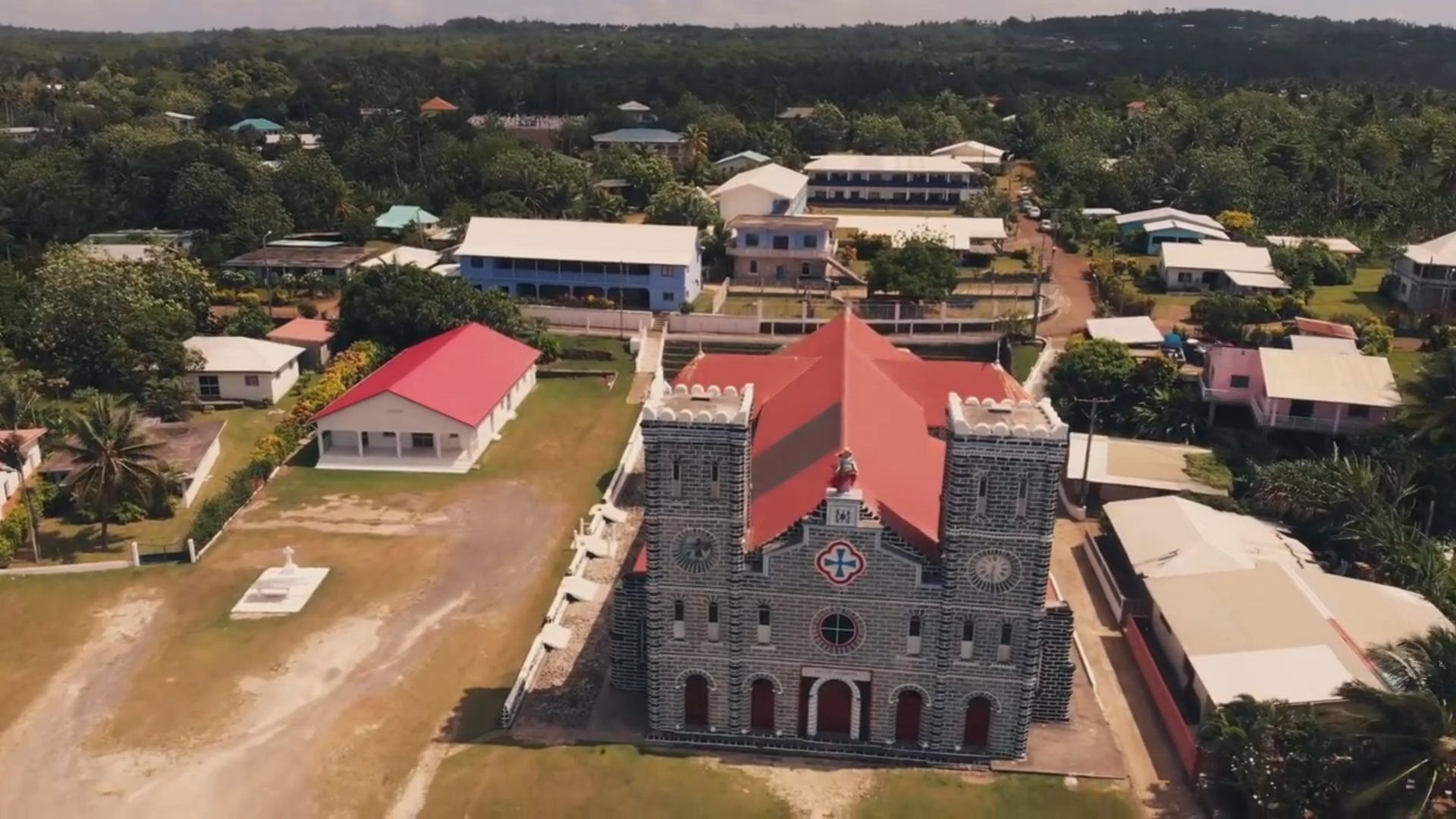
Cathedral of Our Lady of the Assumption, Mata-Utu

The overwhelming majority (99%) of the people in Wallis and Futuna are Catholics, with the island having been evangelized in the 19th century by Fr Peter Chanel, SM. They are served by their own Diocese of Wallis and Futuna, with a see at Mata Utu, a suffragan diocese of the Metropolitan Archdiocese of Nouméa (New Caledonia). There are smaller numbers of people following ethnic religions, the Baháʼí Faith or who have no religion.

== Culture ==
The culture of Wallis and Futuna is Polynesian, and is similar to the cultures of its neighboring nations Samoa and Tonga. The Wallisian and Futunan cultures are very similar to each other in language, dance, cuisine and modes of celebration.

Fishing and agriculture are the traditional occupations, and most people live in traditional oval, thatch fale houses. Kava is a popular beverage brewed in the two islands, as in much else of Polynesia. It also serves as a traditional offering in rituals. Highly detailed tapa cloth art is a specialty of Wallis and Futuna.

Uvea Museum Association is a private museum that holds a collection of objects that record the history of the Second World War in the territory. It is located in Mata Utu shopping center and in 2009 was open by appointment.

== Transport and communications ==
In 2018, the territory had 3,132 telephones in use, one AM radio station, and two television broadcast stations. Communication costs are up to ten times higher than in western countries. The island of Wallis has about 100 km (62 mi) of roadways, 16 of which are paved. The island of Futuna has only 20 km (12 mi) of roadways, none of which are paved. The territory has two main ports, in the harbors at Mata Utu and Leava (on the island of Futuna). These ports support its merchant marine fleet, which comprises three ships (two passenger ships and a petroleum tanker), totaling 92,060 GRT or 45,881 tonnes. There are two airports: Hihifo Airport, on Wallis, which has a 2.1 km (1.3 mi) paved runway; and Pointe Vele Airport, on Futuna, which has a 1 km (0.62 mi) runway. Now the only commercial flights to and from Wallis are operated by Caledonia-based Aircalin, which has an office in Mata Utu. There are currently no commercial boat operators.

=== Newspapers ===
The French High Commission published a local newspaper in the 1970s, Nouvelles de Wallis et de Futuna. Today, news is available online via a local program broadcast by the French television network La Première.

== Education ==
There are 18 primary schools in the territory, 12 on Wallis and six on Futuna, with a combined total of over 5200 students.

The territory has six junior high schools and one senior high school/sixth-form college.

- Junior high schools (collèges) in Wallis: Mataotama de Malae, Alofivai de Lano, Vaimoana de Lavegahau, and Tinemui de Teesi
- Junior high schools in Futuna: Fiua de Sigave and Sisia d'Ono
- The senior high school/sixth-form college is Lycée d'État de Wallis et Futuna on Wallis

There is also an agricultural high school.

== Healthcare ==
As of 2018, yaws was endemic in the area, but cases were not being reported to the WHO eradication program.

Healthcare is available free of charge in two hospitals on Uvea and Futuna islands. There are also three dispensaries.

== Environment ==
Deforestation is a major concern in the region as only small portions of the original forests remain due to the continued use of wood as the main source of fuel. Consequently, the mountainous terrain of Futuna has become prone to erosion. There are no permanent settlements on Alofi due to the lack of natural freshwater resources, and the presence of infertile soil on the islands of Uvea and Futuna further reduces agricultural productivity.

== Sport ==
Wallis and Futuna competes in the Pacific Games. Volleyball and rugby union are popular in the territory, with several rugby players going on to play for the France national rugby union team.

== See also ==
- Outline of Wallis and Futuna
- Administrative divisions of France
- French overseas departments and territories
- Islands controlled by France in the Indian and Pacific oceans
- Katoaga
- Vicariate Apostolic of Oriental Oceania
- Wallis and Futuna during the Second World War
- Statute of Wallis and Futuna (1961)
- Customary kingdoms of Wallis and Futuna
- Protectorate of Wallis and Futuna
- Customary Kings of Wallis and Futuna
- Justice in Wallis and Futuna

== Notes ==
By ISO 639-3 code
Enter an ISO code to find the corresponding language article.
