= Wallis (island) =

Island in Wallis and Futuna

Kingdom of ʻUvea Puleʻaga Hau ʻo ʻUvea
- Flag Coat of arms
- Motto: "Liberté, Egalité, Fraternité" (Motto of France)

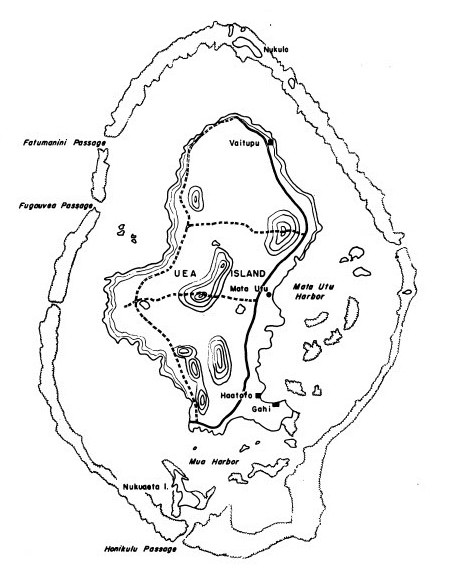
- Detailed map of the island
- Capital and largest city: Mata Utu; 13°18′S 176°12′W
- Official languages: Wallisian (ʻUvean); French
- Demonym: Wallisian
- Government: Constitutional monarchy under a Overseas collectivity
  - King (Lavelua): Patalione Kanimoa
  - Prime Minister (Kalae Kivalu): Setefano Hanisi
  - Bishop of Diocese: Susitino Sionepoe
- Legislature: Territorial Assembly

Traditional customary kingdom
  - Overseas collectivity: 29 July 1961

Area
  - Total: 96 km^{2} (37 sq mi) (211th)
  - Water (%): negligible

Population
  - 2018 census: 8,333
  - Density: 11,136/km^{2} (28,842.1/sq mi)
- Currency: CFP franc
- Time zone: UTC+12
- Calling code: +681
- Internet TLD: .wf

Wallis (Wallisian: ʻUvea) is a Polynesian atoll/island in the Pacific Ocean belonging to the French overseas collectivity (collectivité d'outre-mer, or COM) of Wallis and Futuna. It lies north of Tonga, northeast of Fiji, east-northeast of the Hoorn Islands, east of Fiji's Rotuma, southeast of Tuvalu, southwest of Tokelau and west of Samoa. Its area is almost 100 km^{2} (39 sq mi) with 8,333 people. Its capital is Mata Utu. Roman Catholicism is the predominant religion. Its highest point is Mount Lulu Fakahega (131 m, 430 ft). Wallis is of volcanic origin with fertile soil and some remaining lakes. Rainfall is plentiful.

It was part of the Tongan maritime empire from around the 13th to 16th century. By that time the influence of the Tuʻi Tonga had declined so much that ʻUvea became important in itself. The big fortress of Talietumu close to Lotoalahi in Mua was the last holdout of the Tongans until they were defeated. The island was renamed "Wallis" after a Cornish navigator, Captain Samuel Wallis, who saw it while sailing aboard HMS Dolphin on 16 August 1767. On 5 April 1842, the authorities of Wallis Island requested protection by France with a protectorate treaty signed in April 1887. After a referendum in 1959, Wallis became a French Overseas Territory in 1961.

== Geography ==
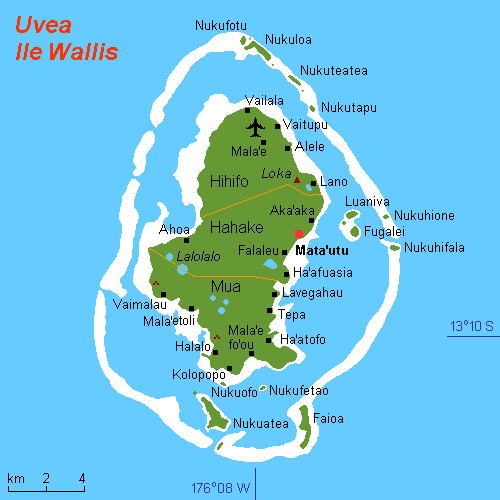
Map of the Wallis Islands

The island has an area of 77.5 km^{2} (29.9 sq mi) and a circumference of c. 50 km (31 mi). Its highest point is Mount Lulu Fakahega, which rises 131 m (430 ft). There are also a few large lakes such as Lake Lalolalo. These crater lakes attest to the island's volcanic origin. Some of the lakes, such as Lalolalo and Lanu'tavake appear as almost perfect circles with straight vertical walls.

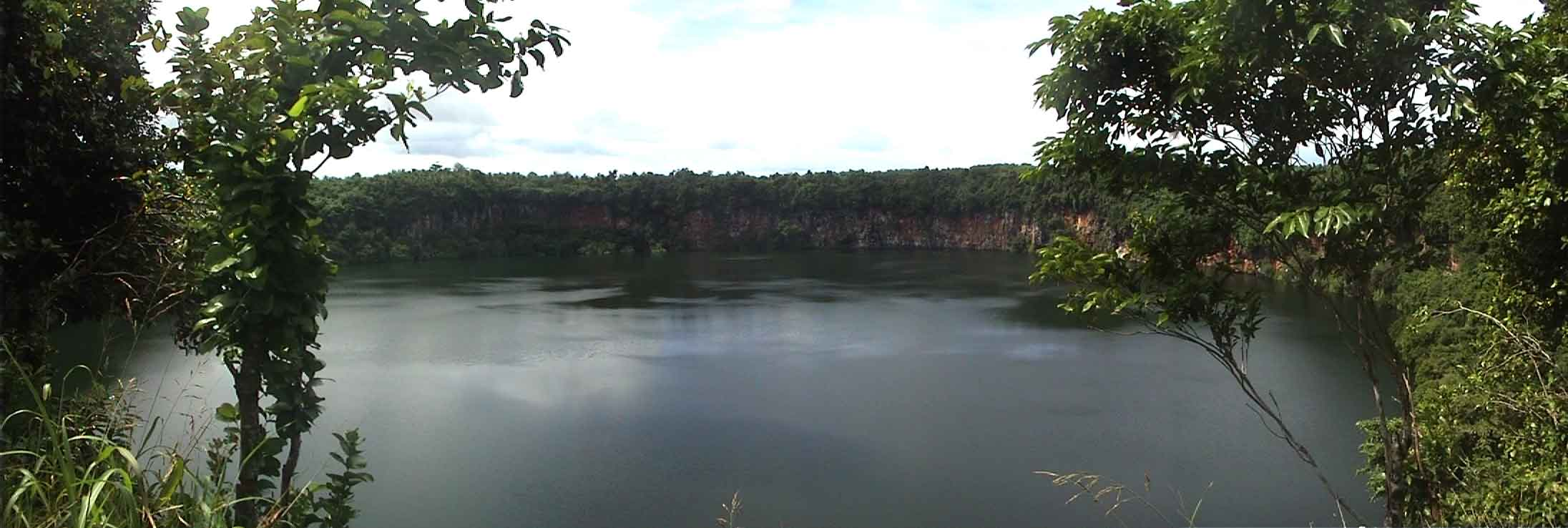
Lake Lalolalo

Wallis Island is located 240 km (150 mi) northeast of Futuna and Alofi islands which form the Hoorn archipelago. Together with some 15 smaller islands surrounding it, on its huge barrier reef, it forms the Wallis archipelago. Wallis has a fertile volcanic soil and sufficient rainfall to allow subsistence farming.

Wallis is subdivided into three districts (north to south):

- Hihifo: 5 villages: Vailala, Tufuone, Vaitupu, Malae, and Alele
- Hahake: 6 villages: Liku, Aka'aka, Mata Utu, Ahoa, Falaleu, and Ha'afuasia
- Mu'a: 10 villages: Lavegahau, Tepa, Gahi, Ha’atofo, Mala’efo’ou, Kolopo, Halalo, Utufua, Vaimalau, and Teesi

| District ("meaning") | Capital | Area (km^{2}) | Population (2003 census) | Villages |
|---|---|---|---|---|
| Hihifo ("West") | Vaitupu | 23.4 | 2422 | 5 |
| Hahake ("East") | Mata Utu | 27.8 | 3950 | 6 |
| Mu'a ("First") | Mala'efo'ou^{A} | 26.3 | 3699 | 10 |
| 'Uvea (Wallis) chiefdom | Mata Utu | 77.5 | 10071 | 21 |

^{A} Formerly called "Mua".

Sub-equatorial oceanic trade winds make the island hot and humid. The average temperature is around 26 °C (79 °F) all year round and almost never drops below 24 °C (75 °F), and in the rainy season is held in the 28–32 °C (82–90 °F) range.

Rainfall is 2,500–3,000 mm (98–118 in) per year, up to 4,000 mm (160 in) in Wallis and Futuna. This rain is likely at least 260 days in a year, and the humidity is 80%. The rainy season lasts from November to April. The same period (November to March), the season of storms, is associated with the passage over the territory of the islands of powerful tropical cyclones. It is followed, in May to October–December, by a cooler and drier season because of the predominance in this period of the southeast trade winds.

=== Climate ===
==== Climate data of Wallis Island ====
Wallis (Hihifo District) has a tropical rainforest climate (Köppen climate classification Af). The average annual temperature in Hihifo is 27.6 °C (81.7 °F). The average annual rainfall is 3,278.7 mm (129.08 in) with January as the wettest month. The temperatures are highest on average in April, at around 28.0 °C (82.4 °F), and lowest in July, at around 27.0 °C (80.6 °F). The highest temperature ever recorded in Hihifo was 33.4 °C (92.1 °F) on 29 April 2004; the coldest temperature ever recorded was 18.0 °C (64.4 °F) on 14 July 2014.

Climate data for Hihifo, Wallis (1991–2020 averages, extremes 1971−present)
| Month | Jan | Feb | Mar | Apr | May | Jun | Jul | Aug | Sep | Oct | Nov | Dec | Year |
|---|---|---|---|---|---|---|---|---|---|---|---|---|---|
| Record high °C (°F) | 33.0 (91.4) | 33.0 (91.4) | 32.8 (91.0) | 33.4 (92.1) | 32.8 (91.0) | 32.1 (89.8) | 31.4 (88.5) | 31.5 (88.7) | 32.0 (89.6) | 31.9 (89.4) | 33.1 (91.6) | 32.7 (90.9) | 33.4 (92.1) |
| Mean daily maximum °C (°F) | 30.7 (87.3) | 30.8 (87.4) | 30.9 (87.6) | 30.8 (87.4) | 30.4 (86.7) | 29.8 (85.6) | 29.4 (84.9) | 29.6 (85.3) | 29.9 (85.8) | 30.1 (86.2) | 30.5 (86.9) | 30.7 (87.3) | 30.3 (86.5) |
| Daily mean °C (°F) | 27.9 (82.2) | 27.9 (82.2) | 27.9 (82.2) | 28.0 (82.4) | 27.7 (81.9) | 27.5 (81.5) | 27.0 (80.6) | 27.1 (80.8) | 27.3 (81.1) | 27.4 (81.3) | 27.6 (81.7) | 27.9 (82.2) | 27.6 (81.7) |
| Mean daily minimum °C (°F) | 25.0 (77.0) | 25.0 (77.0) | 25.0 (77.0) | 25.1 (77.2) | 25.0 (77.0) | 25.1 (77.2) | 24.6 (76.3) | 24.6 (76.3) | 24.8 (76.6) | 24.7 (76.5) | 24.8 (76.6) | 25.0 (77.0) | 24.9 (76.8) |
| Record low °C (°F) | 19.9 (67.8) | 20.5 (68.9) | 19.6 (67.3) | 19.3 (66.7) | 18.5 (65.3) | 19.7 (67.5) | 18.0 (64.4) | 18.4 (65.1) | 19.2 (66.6) | 19.5 (67.1) | 20.5 (68.9) | 19.5 (67.1) | 18.0 (64.4) |
| Average precipitation mm (inches) | 395.2 (15.56) | 332.1 (13.07) | 309.3 (12.18) | 289.1 (11.38) | 223.8 (8.81) | 179.7 (7.07) | 213.4 (8.40) | 165.3 (6.51) | 219.8 (8.65) | 297.8 (11.72) | 306.2 (12.06) | 347.0 (13.66) | 3,278.7 (129.08) |
| Average precipitation days (≥ 1.0 mm) | 20.2 | 18.1 | 19.3 | 17.4 | 16.7 | 14.8 | 15.6 | 14.5 | 15.4 | 17.7 | 18.0 | 19.9 | 207.6 |
| Mean monthly sunshine hours | 170.9 | 161.4 | 175.4 | 185.9 | 180.8 | 167.9 | 179.8 | 192.5 | 191.0 | 187.4 | 181.6 | 175.2 | 2,149.9 |
Source: Météo France

==== Climate crisis ====
Whilst Wallis is high enough to be in no danger of complete submersion due to the rising sea-levels, most of the population lives in coastal settlements which will be affected by climate change and floods.

== History ==
Archaeological excavations have identified sites on Wallis dating from circa 1400 AD. It was part of the Tongan maritime empire from around the 13th to 16th century. By that time the influence of the Tuʻi Tonga had declined so much that ʻUvea became important in itself. Several current, high-ranking Tongan titles, like Halaevalu, trace their descent from ʻUvea. A legendary large canoe, the Lomipeau, was built on the island as a donation to the Tuʻi Tonga. The big fortress of Talietumu close to Lotoalahi in Mua was the last holdout of the Tongans until they were defeated. The ruins of the place are still a tourist attraction.

The island was renamed "Wallis" after a Cornish navigator, Captain Samuel Wallis, who saw it while sailing aboard HMS Dolphin on 16 August 1767, following his discovery of Tahiti.

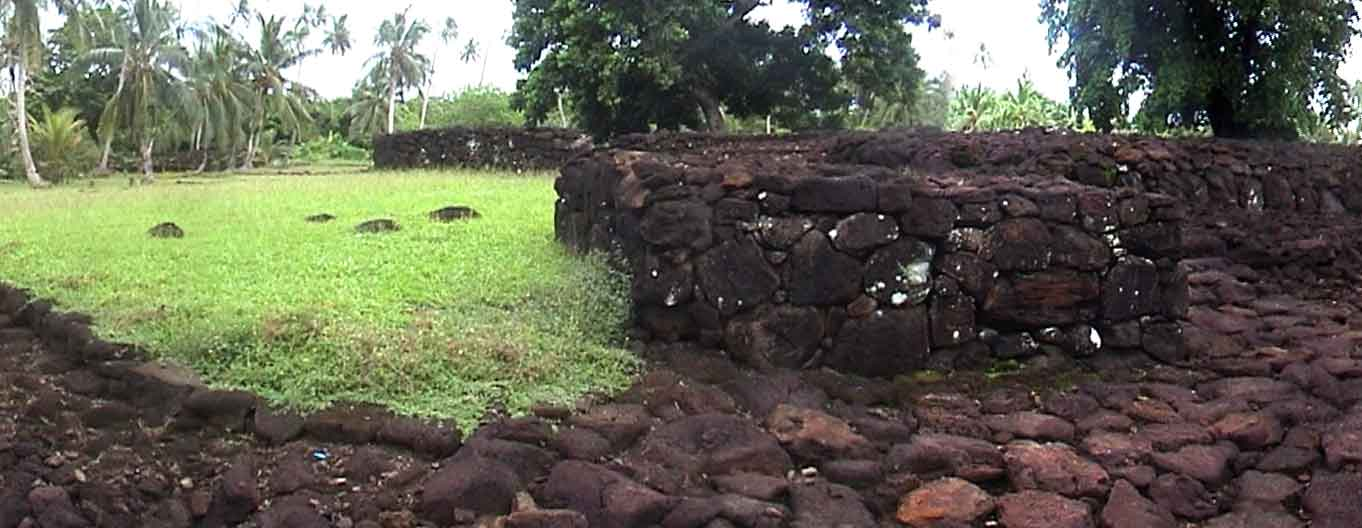
Ruins of the fortress of Talietumu

In 1835, Uvea was attacked by a party of armed missionaries from Tonga, who attempted to convert the island to Protestantism by force. In October 1837, Jean-Baptiste Pompallier visited, and after negotiations with Lavelua, left a priest and a brother behind, ostensibly to learn the language and establish friendly relations. Four years later they reported that Wallis was a Catholic community. On 5 April 1842, the authorities of Wallis Island requested protection by France. A protectorate treaty was signed in April 1887.

During World War II the island's administration was pro-Vichy until a Free French corvette from New Caledonia deposed the regime on 26 May 1942. Units of the US Marine Corps landed on Wallis on 29 May 1942.

After a referendum in 1959, Wallis became a French Overseas Territory in 1961.

== Demographics ==
The population of the island was 8,333 in 2018 (72% of the territory's population). Most of the inhabitants speak ʻUvean (or Wallisian) as their mother tongue.

== Culture and religion ==
Religion ("Lotu") and culture ("Aga'ifenua") are very close in Wallis. Everyday life is heavily influenced by Polynesian traditions and especially by the Roman Catholic feasts. Each village has its own patron saint. Each district has its great church. The chief cathedral is the Cathedral of Mata Utu. Almost all the people are Roman Catholic ("Lotu Katolika"), and there are numerous religious buildings on the island.

At their arrival, Catholic missionaries were welcomed by the King Vaimua Lavelua then baptized "Soane-Patita Vaimua". Bishop Bataillon developed close relationships with the royal families. As Private Councillor of Queen Amelia, he established in 1847 the Lano Seminary (the first Catholic seminary of Oceania).

Lano celebrated 150 years in 1997. The anniversary was attended by Samoan Cardinal Pio Taofinu'u, who studied there in the 1940s, and a big delegation from Tonga, Samoa, Fiji and New-Caledonia.

Wallis and Futuna was established as an apostolic vicariate on 11 November 1935 and promoted to a diocese on 21 June 1966.

== Transportation ==
The only commercial flights to Wallis are operated by the New Caledonia-based Aircalin. There is an Aircalin office in Mata Utu in Hahake.

== Education ==
The island has 12 primary schools, four junior high schools, and one senior high school/sixth-form college.

- Junior high schools (collèges) in Wallis: Mataotama de Malae, Alofivai de Lano, Vaimoana de Lavegahau, and Tinemui de Teesi
- The senior high school/sixth-form college is Lycée d'Etat de Wallis et Futuna on Wallis

== Museums ==
Uvea Museum Association is a private museum in Mata Utu which records the history of the Second World War on the island.

== Notable people ==
- Ilaïsaane Lauouvéa - politician in New Caledonia

== See also ==
- Hihifo Airport
- Samoa hotspot
- Customary kingdoms of Wallis and Futuna
- Royal Palace of Uvea

== Bibliography ==
- E.G. Burrows, Ethnology of Uvea, BPB 1937.
- "Wallis Islands". Global Volcanism Program. Smithsonian Institution.
- Hawkesworth, John; Byron, John; Wallis, Samuel; Carteret, Philip; Cook, James; Banks, Joseph (1773), An account of the voyages undertaken by the order of His present Majesty for making discoveries in the Southern Hemisphere, and successively performed by Commodore Byron, Captain Wallis, Captain Carteret, and Captain Cook, in the Dolphin, the Swallow, and the Endeavour drawn up from the journals which were kept by the several commanders, and from the papers of Joseph Banks, esq, London Printed for W. Strahan and T. Cadell, Volume I, Volume II-III
