= Fagaloa Bay =

Region in Samoa

Coordinates: 13.929°S 171.543°W

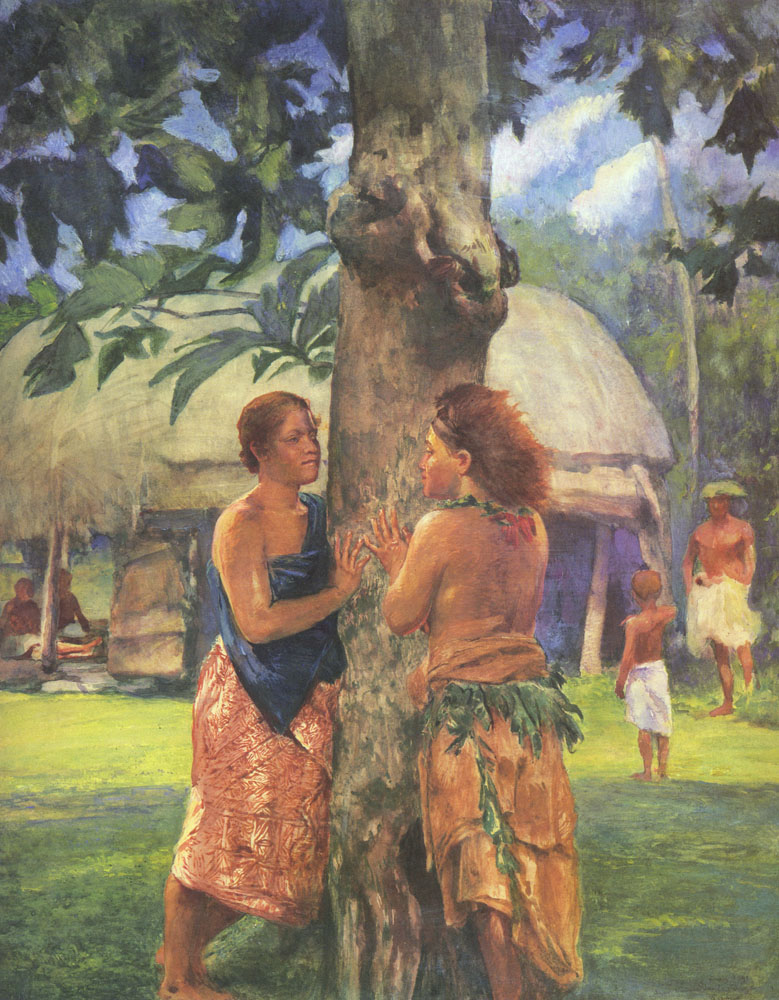
John LaFarge, Portrait of Faase, the Taupou of the Fagaloa Bay (1881)

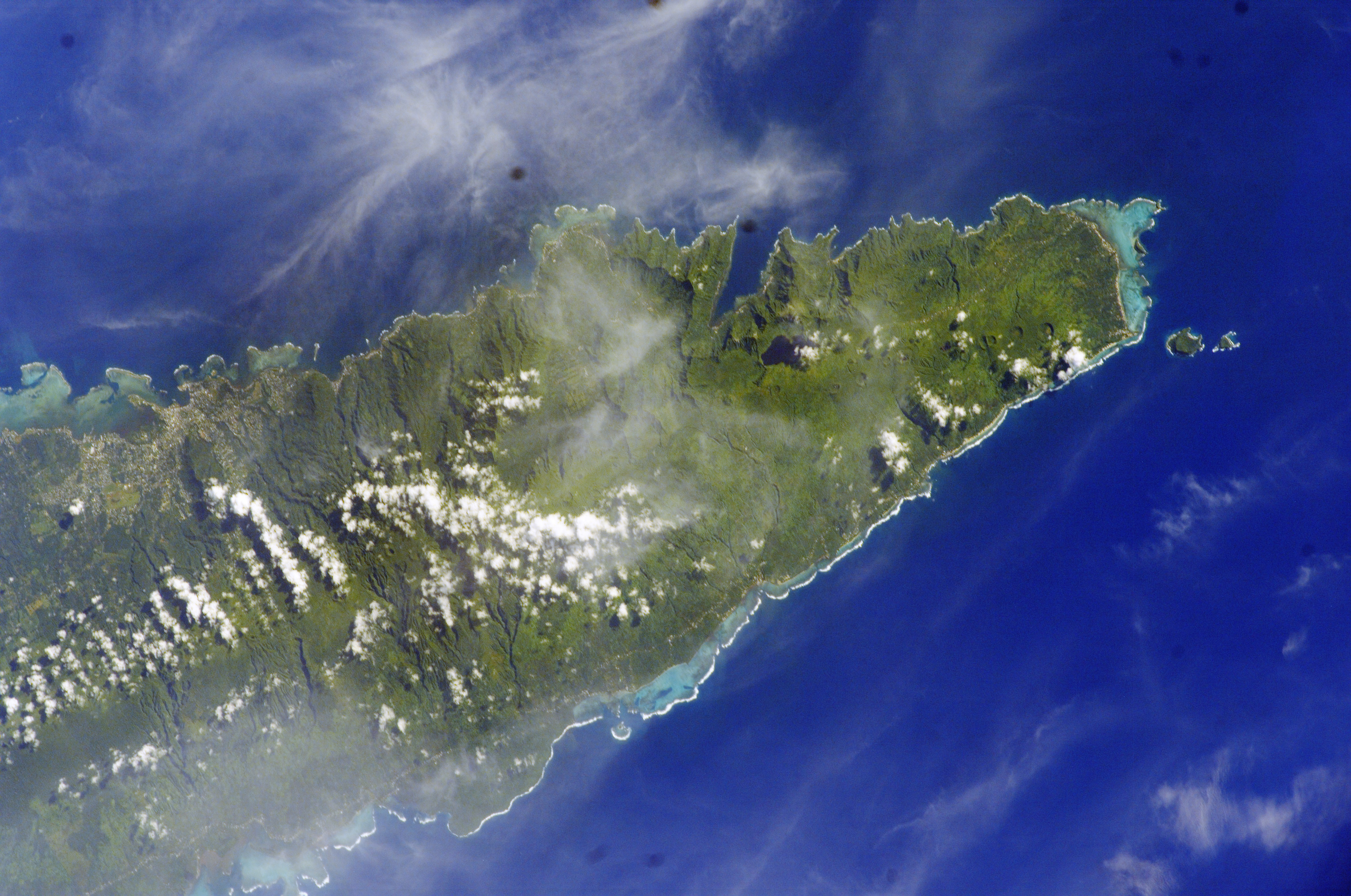
Satellite photo, east side of Upolu with Fagaloa Bay on the north coast. (NASA photo).

Fagaloa is located on the north eastern coast of Upolu island in Samoa. The area is a significant region of conservation and culture. The bay is situated within the political district of Va'a-o-Fonoti and is ruled by Alii Sili Title of the Mata'utia Family line in Lona.

== History ==
The distinctive features of the Fagaloa area portrays some of the most interesting myths and legends in Samoan mythology which are considered invaluable and relevant to the peoples' cultural lifestyle.

=== Ulualofaiga comes to Samoa ===
The King of Tonga, the Tui Toga (Tu'i Tonga in Tongan), took Sinavaituu, daughter of Tuifiti and Sinasamoa, to wife. They begot Tuitoga-Faisautele. Faisautele married Painuulasi and begot Ulualofaiga and a girl named Vaetoifaga. Utufanu-nutunutu who was an adherent of the High Chief and sovereign of A'ana (Tui A'ana) Tamalelagi went to Tonga and induced Vaetoifaga to come to Samoa. He told her that Samoa, her mother's home, was a very beautiful country and different to anything that she had seen. He told her of the wonderful Vai-mata-iva (water pool with nine eyes.) and of the magnetic stone which rises in the water and scrubs the dirt off ones back when bathing. He also told her of the wonderful trees that stood on the banks of this pool and moved as if dancing. Vaitoifaga was captivated by these false stories and came to Samoe. The real reason for bringing her to Samoa was to marry her to Tui A'ana Tamalelagi. When she discovered her position she said she would not agree to marry Tui A'ana without the consent of her brother Ulualofaiga who was in Tonga. When Tui A'ana was convinced that she was determined to adhere to her decision he offered to give to her brother the villages of Vaialua and Nofoalii and down as far as Matatao if she would consent to be his wife. She agreed to these terms and was married. She gave birth to Salamasina who was proclaimed queen of Aana after her father's death.

Ulualofaiga came to Samoa in search of his sister and brought with him one hundred war canoes manned by the slaves of his father Tuitogafaisautele. He arrived at Afagaloa in Savai'i and this town was the home of Sinaletinae. He learned that his sister had become the wife of Tamalelagi and he sailed to Aana to find her. His sister went out into the lagoon at Aana to welcome him and to hand over to him the villages that had been given to him by Tui A'ana. She begged him not to start fighting on her behalf as she was about to become a mother. He agreed and landed with his men and took possession of the villages. The reunion of Ulualofaiga and Vaetoifaga was referred to as “Sootaga mai” which means reconoilliation as the result of pregnancy.

After remaining in Aana for some time, Ulualofaiga proceeded to Fagaloa the home of his ancestors. On his way there he had many fights with opposing districts and he always fought from the gatai ala which means the sea side of the road and was always successful. These victories gave rise to the phrase which is used in all districts “Tulouna a le gatai ala” (meaning “compliments to the party on the seaward side of the road). Ulualofaiga finally reached Fagaloa and there he established his domain.

=== The War of Fonoti ===
During the war against Samalaulu for the Kingship of Samoa, Fonoti sought the assistance of Ulualofaiga's war fleet. Having defeated Samaluulu and made King of Samoa, King Fonoti ruled from his residence in neighbouring Falefa. In return for the services rendered, King Fonoti granted Ulualofaiga autonomous rulership over the Fagaloa District as well as giving him the village of Amanave in Tutuila. Among the many titles the King gave to those who helped him, he also gave Faleapuna and Fagaloa the title 'Vaa-o-Fonoti' (Fonoti's War Canoe) in recognition of their skilled naval fleets who bested the formidable Manono fleet at sea. These titles and salutations distinguishes the district down to the present day.

== Geography ==
The geographic area consists of a mountain formation rising out of the sea. At the base of the bay lies the village Ta'elefaga at the mouth of the Malata river. To the east above the villages of Lona and Uafato are several waterfalls by mountain forests. On the western side is Mount Fao with spurs dissolving seaward into cliffs called Utuloa. Further east lies Uafato Bay at the eastern base of Malata river which displays spectacular landscape of lush rainforest and waterfalls.

== Villages ==
Situated at Fagaloa Bay are the villages of Sauano, Saletele, Musumusu, Salimu, Ta'elefaga, Maasina, Lona, Samamea and Uafato.

== Conservation ==
The area Fagaloa Bay - Uafato Tiavea Conservation Zone includes native forests and bird life earmarked for Unesco's world heritage protection.

== See also ==
- Samoan language
- Fa'amatai, chiefly system of governance in the Samoa Islands
