= SUPP =

SUPP or Supp may refer to:

- Samoan United People's Party
- Sarawak United Peoples' Party, a Malaysian political party
- Support (measure theory), a mathematical concept
- Eckhard Supp, German photographer and writer
