= Lona =

Lona may refer to:

== Places ==
- Lac de Lona, lake in Valais, Switzerland
- Lona, Samoa, village on the island of Upolu
- Lona, Nantou, Bunun village in Nantou County, Taiwan
- Lona, Comilla, village in Comilla District, Chittagong Division, Bangladesh

== People ==
- Lona Andre, American film actress
- Lona Barrison, one of the Barrison Sisters
- Lona Cohen, American spy for the USSR
- Lona Minne, American politician
- Lona Williams, American television producer

== Other ==
- Lona (novel), 1923 Welsh novel by Thomas Gwynn Jones
- Lona, dialect of the Sawila language of Indonesia
- LONA, gambling operator and regulator, Loterie Nationale du Burundi
- LONA (TV series), Japanese anime series
