= Afulilo Dam =

Dam on the island of Upolu in Samoa

- Location within Samoa
- Country: Samoa
- Location: Ta'elefaga, Va'a-o-Fonoti
- Coordinates: 13°58′14.94″S 171°33′43.73″W
- Purpose: Power
- Status: Operational
- Construction began: 1990
- Opening date: 1993
- Construction cost: US$26.6 million

Dam and spillways
- Type of dam: Gravity
- Impounds: Afulilo River
- Height: 20 m (66 ft)
- Length: 82 m (269 ft)
- Spillway type: Controlled, two tainter gates
- Spillway capacity: 150 m^{3}/s (5,300 cu ft/s)

Reservoir
- Creates: Lake Afulilo
- Total capacity: 10,000,000 m^{3} (8,100 acre⋅ft)
- Surface area: 2.5 km^{2} (0.97 sq mi)

Ta'lefaga Hydroelectric Plant
- Coordinates: 13°56′39.28″S 171°34′13.25″W
- Commission date: 1993
- Hydraulic head: 310 m (1,020 ft)
- Turbines: 2 x 2 MW (2,700 hp) Pelton-type
- Installed capacity: 4 MW (5,400 hp)

The Afulilo Dam is a gravity dam on the Afulilo River about 3 km (1.9 mi) south of Ta'elefaga in the district of Va'a-o-Fonoti on Upolu island of Samoa. The primary purpose of the dam is hydroelectric power generation and it supports a 4 megawatts (5,400 hp) power station. It is the largest hydroelectric power station by installed capacity in Samoa. First studied in 1980, construction on the project began in 1990 and the power station was commissioned in 1993. Funding for the US$26.6 million project was provided by the World Bank, Asian Development Bank, International Development Association, European Investment Bank, and European Economic Community loans and grants.

== Ta'elefaga Hydroelectric Plant ==
Water from the 20-metre (66 ft) tall dam is sent down 2.5 kilometres (1.6 mi) of headrace pipe before it reaches 1.4 kilometres (0.87 mi) of penstock. The penstock terminates at Ta'elefaga Hydroelectric Plant where the water spins two 2 megawatts (2,700 hp) Pelton turbine-generators. The elevation between the reservoir and the power station affords a hydraulic head (water drop) of 310 metres (1,020 ft). Efforts to add a third 2 MW turbine-generator and raise the dam by 1.7 m (5.6 ft), thereby increasing the reservoir capacity by 50% to 15,000,000 m^{3} (12,000 acre⋅ft), are currently being studied. In April 2009 SMEC Holdings was awarded a consultancy contract for this work by the Asian Development Bank.

The dam has frequently caused problems for the water supply and marine environment of the nearby village of Ta'elefaga. In 2016 the Samoa Electric Power Corporation completed a project to treat wastewater from the dam.
