= Falefa =

- Le Aai o Fonoti. Le Aai o le Tupu
- Interactive map of Falefa
- Coordinates: 13°53′10″S 171°35′19″W
- Country: Samoa
- District: Atua
- Founded: 300 B.C.

Government
  - Type: Council of Chiefs

Population
  - Total: 1,707 (2,021 census)

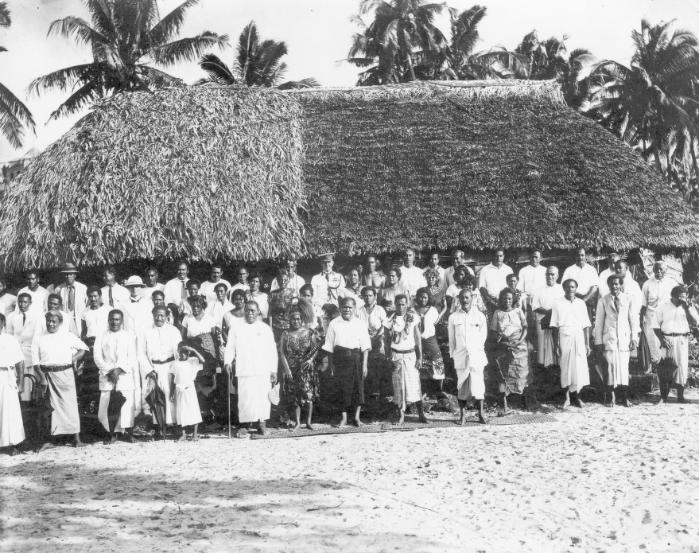
Meeting at Falefa c.1923 – 1928. At the center rear is New Zealander Major General George S. Richardson, Administrator of Samoa between 1923 and 1928.

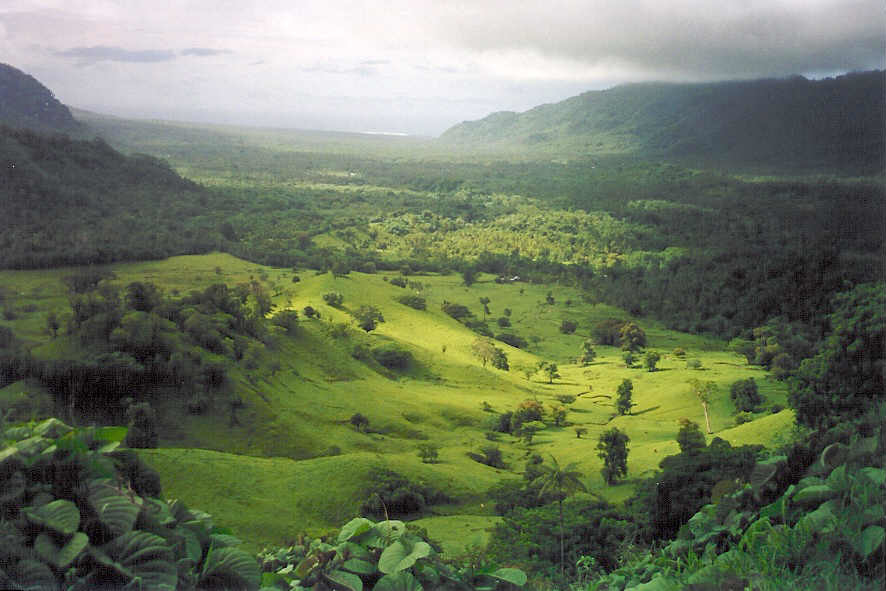
View of Falefa Valley from Le Mafa Pass.

Falefā is located on the north eastern coast of Upolu island in Samoa. It was the ancient capital during the Malo ('government') of Tupu Tafaʻifa (King) Fonoti after defeating his kin Vaʻafusuaga Toleafoa and Samalaulu for control of Samoa. King Fonoti chose to rule from his new seat in Falefa, an honour remembered in its faalupega (Charter and Salutations) to this day.

Falefa is headed by the descendants of its two founders – Moeono Falealoga (tulafale-alii or 'matua) and Leutele Leutogatui (matua-alii), the sons of Tui Atua Lemuaʻiteleloloa and his wife, Leateafaiga.

It is situated in the Anoamaʻa 1 electoral constituency which itself is situated within the larger ancient political 'district' of Anoamaʻa, a province of Atua. Atua is headed by the Tui Atua (sovereign of Atua), a title once held by the seer Tui Ātua Leutele (called Tui Atua Leuteleleiʻite) in the 10th century, during Samoa's period of antiquity. Since the 17th century, this mantle has been occupied mainly by one of the two Tama-a-ʻaiga (maximal lineage chiefs) of Ātua's Salamasina line: Tupua Tamasese and Mataʻafa.

Together with the village of Salani, Falefa is home to one of Samoa's main political families, ʻAiga Sā Fenunuivao (descendants of Fenunuivao, wife of King Muagututiʻa and mother of the first Tupua, Fuiavailili). The family is led by Moeʻono and Leutele of Falefa and Tofuaʻiofoʻia and Fuimaono of Salani, and is the custodian of the Tama-a-ʻĀiga Tupua Tamasese title. Both the Tama-a-ʻāiga Tupua Tamasese and pāpā Tui Atua royal titles are currently held by Samoa's former Prime Minister and Head of State, His Highness Tui Atua Tupua Tamasese Efi.

== History and culture ==
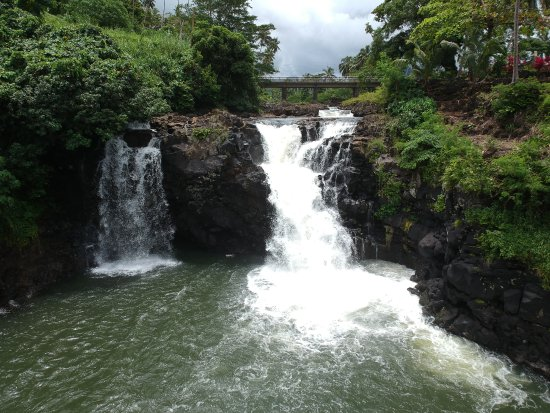
Falefa Falls, popular swimming and recreational spot for tourists and locals.

=== Establishment of Falefa ===
Falefa is one of the oldest and largest settlements in Samoa, with its traditional borders stretching from Uafato to the East, Saoluafata to the west and Lotofaga on its southern border. Oral tradition and archaeological evidence from the nearby Sasoaʻa Lapita discovery site in the Falefa valley place the date of settlement in the area to 300B.C.

According to oral tradition, Falefa was founded by the two sons of Tui Atua Lemuaʻiteleloa and Leateafaiga (daughter of Lufasiaitu of Uafato, Fagaloa) - Moeʻono Faleologa & his brother Leutele Leutogitui. Since then, Falefa has been headed by the descendants of these two brothers through the Moeʻono (tulafale-alii or 'matua') and Leutele (alii) titles.

Leaving their birthplace at Uafato, Fagaloa, they established their first settlement at the top of mountains overlooking Fagaloa Bay and the Falefa valley, called Manuao. The settlement was later moved down to the coast to its present site at the northern edge of the Falefa valley.

The size of Falefa was such that a centralised location was needed to centralize governance. O le Faleupolu o Sagapolu – the administrative centre of Falefa – was created and in which both Leutele and Moeʻono reside. It is from this site that their successors continue to govern Falefa down to the present day. Other sub-villages (4) followed; Saleapaga followed by Sagapolu, Gagaemalae & Sanonu. Moeʻono and Leutele bestowed titles on prominent individuals, creating leading Aliʻi (sacred chief) titles Alaiʻasā, Lealaisalanoa and others who in turn, established 'vassal' houses of their own (called Matai tautua) to advise on governance matters, to serve in war and to assist with the upkeep of the great houses in times of peace. These leading chiefs and their vassals continue to assist Moeʻono and Leutele with the administration of the growing district as part of Falefa's council of chiefs.

The brothers and their respective heirs traveled extensively throughout their domain – from Lemafatele (known as Le Mafa Pass today) to Sasoaʻa (where Lapita pottery remains have been found), to Sauano and Saletele in the Fagaloa bay and the mountains overlooking the valley below where the village of Falefa stands today.

=== Continued Growth and Establishment of new villages ===
In later times, portions of Falefa's lands were gifted by Tui Atua Polailevao to form the village of Lufilufi. According to oral tradition, the name was given when a large fish was caught by a young fisherman and under instructions from Tui Atua, was divided up among the high chiefs of Atua. Lufilufi would go on to become the capital of Atua and maintain close kinship links with Falefa.

Other villages were founded and remain under the leadership of Falefa and are known collectively as the Falefitu: Sauano and Saletele in the Fagaloa Bay, Falevao and Lalomauga.

Moeono and Leutele's sister, Sina, lived on the other side of the village near Lufilufi, in the area known as Falefa. This land had been gifted to her.

Fale and his brother Puna traveled from Manono to visit their kin, King Fonoti, seeking food for their blind and gravely ill father. Upon their return to Manono after meeting King Fonoti, they were met with devastating news: their father had already distributed all his matupalapala (land and titles) and mavaega (inheritance) to others. Heartbroken and disappointed, they stopped at Sina's house for food and water. While conversing with her, Sina encouraged them to stay with her, promising to inform their brothers, Moeono and Leutele, of their grief and hardship. Over the years, the two brothers served Sina with loyalty and kindness. Eventually, one brother moved to Savaiʻi and settled there with his family.

Sina later married and gave birth to her first son, whom she named Tialavea. She established her village and named it Fale ma Puna, later shortened to Faleapuna, in honor of the two brothers from Manono who had served her with dedication. Puna was bestowed the title Molioʻo, with responsibilities that included delivering messages (molimolioʻo feau) or conveying Sina's wishes to her brothers or elsewhere as needed.

These villages maintain historical ties to Falefa, reflecting centuries of intricate political alliances, inter-marriages and shared heritage.

=== Salamasina kidnapping plot ===
Many years earlier, Tui Atua Togiai, the victor of the war of succession, established his residence at Foganiutea in Fagaloa. His grandson, Matautia, lived in Saleaumua in the Aleipata district, where he married Sooaʻe. Before they could have a child, Matautia was assassinated by Leifi and Tautolo. Fearing for her life and that of her unborn child, Sooaʻe fled Atua, leaving her family name, Levalasi, to the Atua branch of her clan. This act marked the founding of one of Samoa's most significant families: the ʻAiga Sa Levalasi.

Years later, messengers from Lufilufi invited Queen Salamasina and Levalasi (Sooaʻe) to visit their town and district. As one of Salamasina's titles was Tui Atua, she could not decline the invitation, especially as Lufilufi, the capital of Atua, was a strong supporter of her rule. Levalasi welcomed the opportunity to visit, not only to reconnect with her many relatives but also to investigate the murder of her husband.

The following morning, Salamasina and Levalasi departed in a large double canoe (alia) and arrived in Saluafata harbor by the afternoon. That evening, the conversation turned to the political situation in Atua. Sooaʻe learned that several Tongan war canoes were docked in Fagaloa. This news piqued her interest, and she resolved to investigate further.

While Salamasina explored the village, Sooaʻe stayed behind to gather information about the Tongans in Lona, Fagaloa. She discovered that Leifi and Tautolo were closely allied with the Tongans, raising her suspicions of impending trouble. Ulualofaiga, the brother of Tui Tonga Faaulufanua and married to a Samoan woman from the Leota family, had lived in Lona for years. When he heard that his niece, Queen Salamasina, was in Lufilufi, he sent orators to invite her to his village. Salamasina accepted and promised to visit the next day.

As they set sail, treacherous seas forced the group to anchor at Musumusu, where they stayed at Foganiutea. During the reception, Sooaʻe informed Salamasina of the Tongans' secretive arrival and urged caution in dealing with them. That evening, two Tongan emissaries visited the Queen, prostrating themselves before her and kissing her feet. They invited her to visit their chief, Ulualo, in Lona, claiming he had urgent news from Tonga.

Salamasina agreed to respond later. Upon further inquiry, she learned that six large Tongan war canoes had been anchored in Lona for weeks, causing dissatisfaction among the villagers due to the strain on resources. Sensing deception, Levalasi devised a plan. She instructed messengers to summon warriors from Lufilufi, Faleapuna, and Falefa to lie in wait behind the bay's western cape. Others were sent to Lepa, Lotofaga, and Salani to approach Lona from the mountains and surround the Tongans at the sound of a conch shell.

The next day, Salamasina and her party traveled to Lona by boat. Upon arrival, they noticed a growing number of Tongans encircling the guesthouse. Inside, Ulualo greeted the Queen and explained that her mother, Vaetoe, was gravely ill and wished to see her. He offered to take her to Tonga aboard the Tongan canoes. Salamasina chastised him for his delay in delivering the news and demanded to see the messenger, but Ulualo claimed the man was hiding in fear.

Meanwhile, Sooaʻe observed the increasing number of Tongans and recognized her enemies, Leifi and Tautolo, among them. Sensing danger, she ordered her attendant to blow the conch shell, signaling the hidden Samoan fleets. The sudden arrival of Samoan war canoes and warriors from the mountains surrounded the Tongan forces, thwarting their plot to abduct the Queen.

Realizing their defeat, Ulualo and his Tongans prostrated themselves before Salamasina. She demanded the immediate departure of all Tongan warriors, warning Ulualo to remain as her hostage. As the Tongans retreated, Leifi and Tautolo fled, their treachery exposed. Leutele, the leader of the Falefa fleet, offered to execute Ulualo, but Salamasina spared his life, cautioning him against future betrayals.

Grateful for her clemency, Ulualo confessed the plot orchestrated by Leifi and Tautolo to abduct Salamasina and install their own candidate as Tui Atua. To atone, Ulualo presented the Queen with a hundred fine mats, including the renowned Lagavaa. He pledged his loyalty to her and vowed to serve her faithfully, ensuring peace and security in Atua.

=== War and the establishment of Falefa as the seat of King Fonoti ===
One of the early powerful figures of Samoa was Faumuina le Tupufia of Savaii. A direct descendant of Queen Salamasina's daughter, Fofoaivaoese, he was called "le tupufia" due to having in effect, all the powers of King, although never fully attaining it in title, as Atua had refused to bestow the Tui Atua title when his cousin, Tupuivao, was passed over as Queen Taufau's successor, an act which angered the Atua polities. Despite this, his royal pedigree was undeniable, a fact that would set the stage for one of the great sagas in Samoan history.

Faumuina had three children, two sons and one daughter. The sons were named Fonoti and Vaafusuaga and the daughter was named Samalaulu. They are commonly known in the traditions of Samoa as "The Three of Faumuina." Each child was by a different mother so that after the death of their father they individually contended for the Kingship.

Having waged war successfully for the crown against his kin, Fonoti was proclaimed King in c.1640. He conferred many honours upon those chiefs and Districts that had fought for him and such honours and privileges are remembered and passed down by Samoa's Tulafale (Orator chiefs) in customary salutations down to the present day.

For contending with the Manono, Sapapaliʻi and Saleaumua naval forces and securing his victory at sea, the leaders of Faleapuna and Fagaloa were granted a district of their own called Vaa-o-Fonoti ('Fonoti's War Fleet'). For leading Fonoti's land forces and securing victory on land, Falefa was designated the salutation of Aai o Fonoti or Aai o le Tupu (the "Seat of Fonoti" or "Seat of the King"). Falefa continued as the administrative centre of Fonoti, Muagututiʻa and Tupua's respective malo until the time of Fonoti's grandson, King Afoa (later Afoafouvale), who chose to rule from Lufilufi, the centre of Ātua.

These honors are reflected to this day in the Faʻalupega o Samoa (customary charter and honorific salutations of Samoa).

== ʻAiga Sā Fenunuivao and their Tama a ʻaiga, Tupua (later known as 'Tupua Tamasese') ==
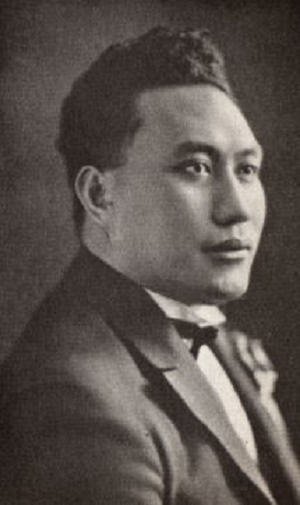
Mau leader Tupua Tamasese Lealofi III, assassinated in 1929 by NZ Colonial forces.

Historical Background

The pāpā titles confer upon individual holders authority over designated territory or, in the case of a Tafaʻifā (holder of all four pāpā titles) status as King or Queen of all Samoa (excluding the Manuʻa Group). However, these titles are usually contested exclusively among Samoa's royal lineages, each with a paramount title holder and a titular figure in whom the mana (honour) of the family is represented. These are called tama-a-ʻāiga ('sons of the royal families').

Sa Tupua and Sa Malietoa are the two principal royal lineages from whom many other high titles draw legitimacy and prestige. The older Sa Malietoa family dates back to the 13th century during the Tongan period and comprises Malietoa and his descendants. Sa Tupua came to the fore when its titular ancestor, Queen Salamasina rose to power. The family is made up of her descendants and is headed by Tupua Tamasese.

Tupua Tamasese is the tama of the Sā Tupua, the descendants of Salamasina and comprises several notable families and lineages such as Sā Fenunuivao, Sā Levalasi, Aiga o Mavaega and others. Among these families, Sā Fenunuivao is the primary political family of Falefa and Salani and holds overall custodianship and authority over the Tupua Tamasese title.

Fuiavailili: The first Tupua

King Muagututiʻa, son of King Fonoti, married Fenunuivao, daughter of Leutele of Falefa. Because they had no children of their own, they adopted Fenunuivao's nephew Fuiavailili, from Salani, as their son and heir. Upon his arrival in Falefa, he was given the name 'Tupua' and was thereafter known as Tupua Fuiavailili, the first Tama-a-ʻāiga.

As the child was now the sole heir to King Muagututiʻa, the powerful orator groups of Pule and Tumua performed their customary right of saesae laufaʻi (investigating one's genealogical links) enquiring as to whether he possessed the necessary genealogical links in order to be worthy of tafaʻifa honours. Thus it was revealed that Fuiavailili's biological father was Fuimaono, and biological mother Saʻilau, descendants of Fanene and direct descendants of Queen Salamasina's son and second child, Tapumanaia (also known as Tapusatele).

King Muagututiʻa himself was descended from Queen Salamāsina's eldest child, Fofoaivaoʻese. Thus it was that Tupua Fuiavailili, through both ancestral lines, was the first ruler of Samoa to have inherited from both of Queen Salamāsina's children, re-uniting the Salamasina lineages through his ancestor, Tapumanaia, Salamāsina's husband (from which comes the Fuimaono and Fanene line), and Muagututiʻa's ancestor Fofoaivaoʻese, Salamasina's daughter from a previous relationship with Alapepe, (from the Fonoti, Muagututiʻa line). Having satisfied the requirements of having direct lineage to Salamāsina and demonstrable link to both lineages and prominent families, Tupua Fuiavailili's royal pedigree was affirmed by the orators of Lufilufi and Leulumoega and was proclaimed the first Tama a ʻĀiga, succeeding Muagututiʻa to becoming King ('Tupu Tafaʻifā) of Samoa.

== The Aloaliʻi: Luafalemana. ==
From his four usuga (marriages), King Tupua Fuiavailili had five children. Two went on to become King, while the third went on to becoming one of the ancestors of Atua's other tama-a-ʻāiga title: Mataʻafa. The beginnings of the tama-a-ʻāiga Mataʻafa lineage is traced through to Luafalemana, son of King Tupua Fuiavailili. This was enabled through the union of Luafalemana's daughter, Salainaʻoloa of ʻAiga Sā Fenunuivao with Tuimavave (also known as Tauiliʻili) of ʻAiga Sā Levālasi, issuing one of the progenitors of the Matāʻafa title, Faʻasuamaleʻaui, in 1785. Tuimavave's other union with Letelesa issued another progenitor of the title, Silupevailei. These two lines of Faʻasuamaleʻaui and Silupevailei are from whom all Mataʻafa are selected. Family traditions differ on who was the first Mataʻafa, but the majority of opinion favours Tafagamanu, grandson of Faʻasuamaleʻaui. Tuimavave's union with Tupua's granddaughter, Salainaʻoloa, has resulted in the Luafalemana title's association with both the Tupua Tamasese and the Matāʻafa titles. Several Matāʻafa holders from Falefa also held the Tupua title concurrently, like Mataʻafa Iosefo who became known as Tupua Matāʻafa Iosefo. By joining the daughter of Luafalemana with Tuimavave, the Tui Atua line arrives at a harmonious junction between the two great Tama-a-ʻāiga families of Atua – ʻAiga Sā Levālasi and ʻAiga Sā Fenunuivao.

The Tupua Tamasese is selected from these three lines of descent:

- Luafalemana of Falefā, From Tupua's first marriage to Punipuao, daughter of Alaʻiasa. Ancestor of the Mataʻafa Iosefo tama-a-ʻāiga through his daughter Salainaʻoloa, who married Tuimavave of the Aiga Sā Levalasi and sired the elder Mataʻafa line of Faasuamaleʻaui.
- Afoa of Palauli. Succeeded his father to become King and ruled from Lufilufi. Defeated in single combat by his brother, Galumalemana. Later named ʻAfoafouvale, after his defeat.
- Galumalemana of Saleimoa. Succeeded his brother Afoa as King by defeating him at Maauga, Leulumoega. The current line of Tupua are from this line of descent and it was from among his descendants – Tamasese Titimaea – that Tamasese became part of the title, hence Tupua Tamasese

Collectively, these titles are known as Aloaliʻi (Dauphins or heirs). The establishment of the institution of aloalii ensured the continuation of the Tupua's political influence through his descendants and to maintain in perpetuam the genealogical linkages between the first Tupu Tafaʻifa, Queen Salamasina and later Tupu Tafaʻifa, King Fonoti, from whom later rulers would draw legitimacy.

== Politics and governance ==
Falefa means the 'House of Four', indicative of the four sub-villages which make up the main components of Falefa; Sagogu, Gagaemalae, Saleapaga, Sagapolu. Each of these sub villages comprises families and clans, the heads of which, represent their extended families and their respective area at Falefa's council of chiefs, headed by the Moeʻono and Leutele. Falefa is administered and governed by Leutele, Lealaisalanoa, Alaiʻasā as the Alii (Chiefs) of Falefa and by both Matua (elder Orator-Chiefs or 'tulafale-alii') Moeʻono and ʻIuli. Leutele is the ranking alii of the village and Moeʻono is the ranking tulafale-alii. Lealaisalanoa is the second ranking alii with Alaiʻasā the third. ʻIuli is the tulafale-alii of Lealaisalanoa and is the other matua of Falefa. Leutele is addressed as Tinā o Tupua (Tupua's Mother), honoring the first Tupua's mother Fenunuivao and maternal Grandfather, Leutele. Moeʻono is customarily addressed as "le tamā o le nuʻu" ('the father of the village').

The establishment of Moeʻono and Leutele titles predate the Tongan period, as the primordial holders were the sons of Tui Atua Muaʻiteleloa (one of the earliest holders of the Tui Atua pāpā title) and founders of Falefa somewhere between 300B.C – 200 A.D.

=== The Village Fono: Falefā, Falelima and the Falefitu ===
The scale of the meeting varies depending on the situation. The most common meetings comprise only the four sub-villages of Falefa: Sagapolu, Saleapaga, Gagaʻemalae and Sanonu. The range of participants define the three types of meetings. In this context, the word fale means sub-village.

The regular weekly meeting of Falefa's council of chiefs is attended only by the matai from the four sub-villages of Falefa. A fono falelima is a meeting with the four sub-villages of Falefa and the village of Falevao. The convocation of a special meeting of all the villages that are part of Falefa's traditional domain, which includes the four sub-villages of Falefa, Falevao and the two villages of Sauano and Saletele in the Fagaloa Bay is called only on matters of grave importance and is decided by 'Moeʻono and Leutele as well as the leading chiefs of the falefitu.

=== Selection of Falefa's two senior leaders: Leutele and Moeono ===
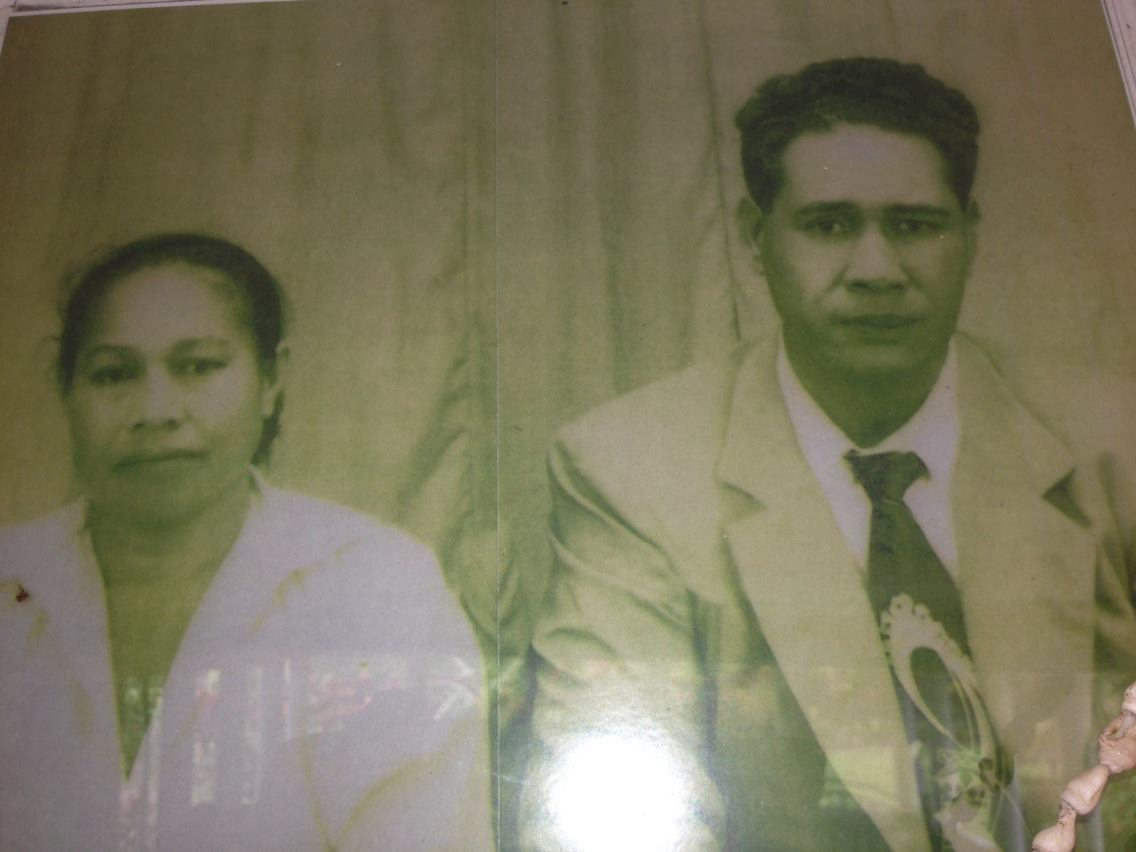
The late Moeʻono Alaiʻasā Kolio (Moeʻono from 1957 to 1987), one of the signatories of the Constitution, pictured here with his wife, Aniva Atoafuaiupolu -Auvaʻa of Tanugamanono & Tiʻavea

Upon the death of a Moeʻono or Leutele, the district goes into an extended period of mourning and kicks off the procession of cultural protocol and rituals that follows. The funeral rites of the Leutele, Moeʻono, ʻIuli and Lealaisalanoa commence with the Lagi (sacred offering of rare fine mats and offerings) which is received by the Moeʻono.

During this sede vacante period, the administration of Falefa is then passed to ʻIuli, Lealaisalanoa, Alaiʻasā and Falefa's other matai (chiefs of each family) until a Moeʻono or Leutele is appointed.

At the appointed time when an heir has been chosen, the proceedings of the saofaʻi (bestowment ceremony) stipulate that only the two bearers of the titles of the two brothers – Moeʻono and Leutele – are part of this sacred ritual. Only once it has been completed with the completion of the ʻava ceremony and the title bestowed will the rest of the village chiefs be invited in to the residence to join them (usu le nuu), a process led by ʻIuli. The ceremony is guarded by Tupua ma le Aumaga (the name for Falefa's untitled men's guild).

The two titles have enjoyed a long tradition of only ever having a single holder of the respective titles at any given time, a practice only recently changed with the appointment of multiple concurrent Leutele title holders. The late Moeʻono Leateafaiga Atoafuaiupolu Penitito Alaiʻasa is the most recent holder of the Moeʻono title, which he held until his passing in 2018.

Both titles remained vacant from 2018, pending appointment of the new holders by the respective heirs. On 1 December 2024, two heirs were named to become joint holders of the Leutele title: Leutele Niava Mataomaile Tuatagaloa and Leutele Malota Faleupolu. Leutele Niava Mataomaile Tuatagaloa is a Justice of the Supreme Court of Samoa and the first woman appointed hold the Leutele title. This was also the first saofaʻi of a Leutele without an incumbent Moeʻono (and vice versa) to participate in the ancient ritual where the descendant of one brother presided over the ascension of the other. The ceremony was presided over by ʻIuli and Lealaisalanoa and attended by the tama of Aiga Sa Fenunuivao, His Highness Tui Atua Tupua Tamasese Efi.

== Folklore ==
=== Lautivunia: The Tuʻi Tonga and Tui Atua Leuteleleiʻite ===
The Tui Tonga (ruler of Tonga) had two sons. The elder was named Tuitonga after his father, the younger, Lautivunia. Lautivunia had an affair with his brother's wife. When the affair became known, the older brother was very angry.

As is the custom, the younger brother made a peace offering of cooked food wrapped in tolo (ordinary sugar cane) and fiso (wild sugar cane) leaves. These leaves underlined the message: "Please forgive me, for we are brothers."

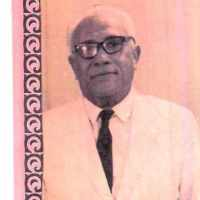
The late Leutele Tapusatele Keli Tuatagaloa, ranking alii of Falefa. (1940–2012).

But Tuitoga was not placated and Lautivunia made another peace offering, which included the flesh of ordinary bananas and of the lei (wild banana). The two varieties of banana underlined the message, "We are flesh and blood – surely you can find it in your heart to forgive me?" Tuitoga was still not placated. So Lautivunia decided that if his brother would not accept his food offerings he would offer his life. He dug a hole where his catamaran was housed, fixed spears with points upward at the bottom of the hole, and threw himself on the spears. The force of his action caused the surrounding earth and sand to cave in and cover him.

When Lautivunia's disappearance was noticed, his father and brother sent out search parties to look for him. One party reached Falefa, Samoa. Tui Atua Leuteleleiʻite said, "You need not have come so far. Lautivunia is in Tonga under his catamaran."

So the search party returned to Tonga and found the body of Lautivunia. The Tui Toga felt obliged to reciprocate this favour from Tui Atua Leutele Leiʻite and instructed the search party to return to Samoa with the finest of his fine mats, which he named Le Ageagea o Tumua (the substance of Tumua). In addition, he recognised Tui Atua Leuteleleiite's seer abilities by confirming that Leutele Leiite was in fact had the ability to see things, that is, Leutele Leiite with the prophetic powers.

The name Leutele continued down to his great-grandnephews Moeono Faleologa and Leutele Leutogi and their surviving kins as of today. The Leiite name has now become an orator matai title within the Moeono and Leutele families in Falefa as one of the titles of the Sā Leutele and Sa Moeono family.

=== The ravages of war: ʻIuli Potini calls for peace ===
In later centuries, a great war between Tuamasaga and the two allies, Atua and Aʻana ravaged the country. Having been defeated, Malietoa Uitualagi and the Tuamasaga army sought refuge at Ana o Seuao in Saʻanapu, Safata. Atua and Aʻana forces gave chase and as they arrived at Ana, prepared to complete their victory by burning the entire region and killing off the rest of Malietoa's troops.

The stage was set for perhaps the most celebrated of all Samoan orations. Among the warriors of Atua was the orator (tulafale) Iuli Potini of Falefa; and he it was, who, in an effort to save the people of Tuamasaga from the peril which confronted them, spoke with unflagging fervour for two full days and nights entreating the leaders of Atua and Aʻana to have mercy on their captives. His oration was not, however, a disinterested appeal, for in the cave together with her husband, Pulemagafa—an orator (tulafale) of Fangaliʻi (a village in Tuamasaga), was the daughter of Iuli and her two children. The daughter's name is said to have been Talalaufala, and her two children were Salamaleulu, a girl, and Falefataaliʻi, a boy. This boy Falefataaliʻi, was the sole surviving male descendant of Iuli Potini and would upon Iuli's death have inherited his lands and title. According to Samoan custom he would be termed o le gafa malō o Iuli, and his position is one of great importance. It was in an attempt then to preserve the life of this boy and so maintain his family line intact that Iuli spoke for so long and with such vehemence. Iuli's remarkable oration is still remembered throughout all Samoa in the expression: O se Iuli which is used in reference to any orator who speaks with great persistence and to great length. The tract of land in which the cave lies is still known as Potini in memory of Iuli.

Iuli's words were heard by the people of Tuamasaga, and the nature of his oration was conveyed to Malietoa and the other chiefs and orators within the cave. Pulemagafa, too, must have heard the story of Iuli's plea, and old and blind as he was, he made his way forward to the mouth of the cave guided by his son Falefataaliʻi. As he groped his way he was assailed by the taunts of his fellow captives, for to them he was making but a hopeless gesture. He pressed on however until gaining the mouth of the cave, and questioning his son so as to determine the identity of those without, he made an oration in reply to Iuli and the chiefs and orators of Atua and Aʻana, pleading for deliverance. Pulemagafa's earnest appeal was poorly received, for great was the rancour between the warring districts, until he announced that Malietoa was willing to pay as ransom (togiola, which literally means, 'the price of one's life') the island of Tutuila. Such an offer was eagerly grasped, and before long the great sailing canoes of Atua were heading eastward to claim the prize, while Malietoa and his crest-fallen followers returned to their villages. This famous incident is still remembered in the proverb—Ua tosi faʻalauti le eleele o Tutuila (The land of Tutuila has been torn to shreds even as the strands of a native skirt), and to this day many of the village names and chiefly titles of Tutuila still bear witness to the nature of their origin, derived directly as they were from the district of Atua.

For his efforts in ending the conflict, ʻIuli Potini was elevated from tulafale to tulafale-alii and given the rank of Matua by Moeʻono Taeleomoamoa. Furthermore, his kava cup was named Lau ipu lenei; lua ao, lua po (This is your kava cup: 'The two nights and the two days'). Thus is the feat of his famous ancestor still commemorated. The current ʻIuli are numerous with his descendant ʻIuli Salale Moananu continuing this role in Falefa alongside the current chiefs of Falefa.

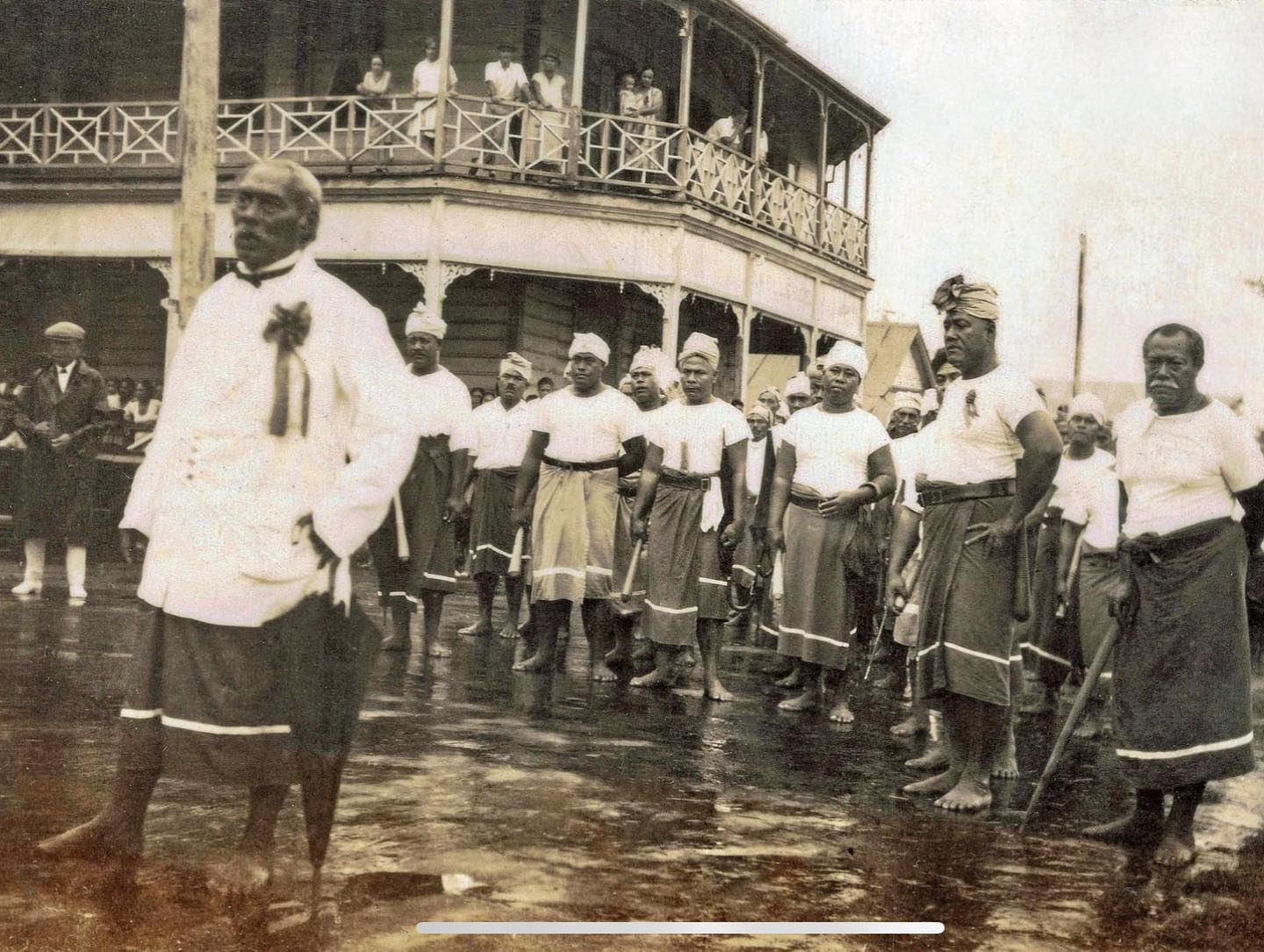
June 1929: Some of the leaders of the Mau, Samoa's Independence movement during colonial days. Standing behind Tuimalealiifano Si'u (left in white) is Moeono Luafalemana Taele (partially obscured) of Falefa. (L-R): The man in dark raincoat is Mr Thomas Slipper, a lawyer who represented Mau members, Tuimalealiʻifano Siʻu, Moeono Luafalemana Taele of Falefa, Suʻa or Lamasi at rear, Lefau of Vailele, Tagaloa, Lavea of Safotu, Savaiʻi, Mataʻafa Faumuina Fiame Mulinuʻu I of Lepea and Lotofaga and Pasia, of Faasaleleaga, Savaiʻi.

=== Independence: Moeʻono and The Mau Movement ===
In the early days of the Mau movement, Luafalemana Moeʻono Taʻeleomoamoa resigned from his post at the administration's Native Police to assist with efforts to garner national support for the fledgling independence movement.

As Pule (the orators and polity heads of Savaii) were yet to pledge their unanimous support, he was tasked with leading a fleet of fautasi (canoes) together with some of Upolu's Tumua orator polity to treat with the orators of Savaii and request their support.

Choosing to arrive at Satupaʻitea instead of Saleʻaula, Moeʻono recalled Falefa's earlier support for the Mau a Pule (which Savaii's orators had led during the German administration, a precursor to the Mau Movement) and called on Asiata to have Pule (Savaii's orator polity and counterpart to Upolu's Tumua) reciprocate their solidarity by joining forces with them in order to nationalise the cause for independence.

His son, Moeʻono Alaiʻasā Kolio would later become one of the Framers of the Constitution of the newly Independent State of Western Samoa.

== Title contention and controversies ==
=== Disputes over the Tupua Tamasese title ===
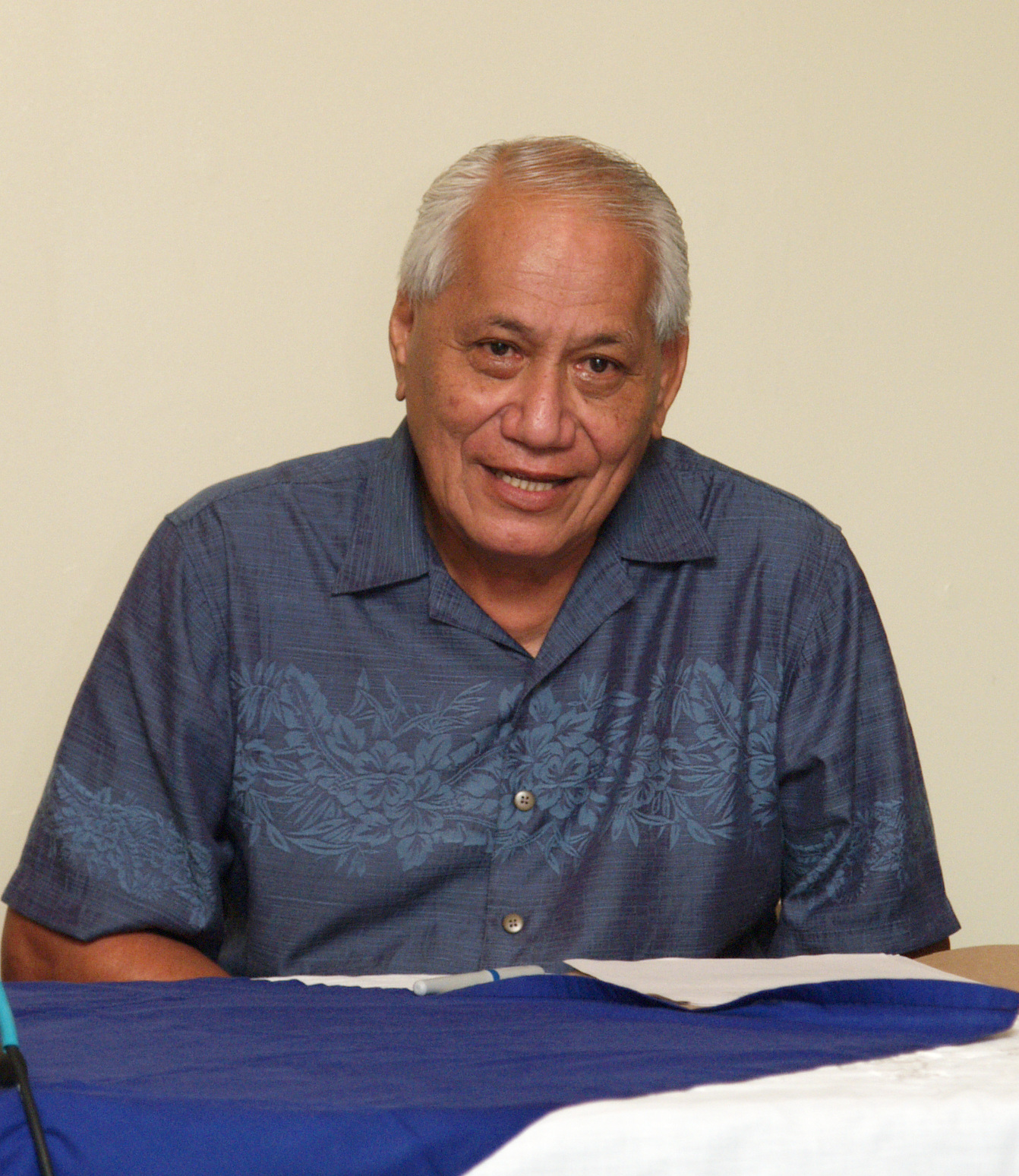
The current holder, Tui Atua Tupua Tamasese Efi. Appointed by Falefa and Salani's ʻAiga Sa Fenunuivao to be the holder of the Tama Aiga title in 1986.

Falefa and the Tupua Tamasese have a long history, dating back to when the first Tupua was installed by his family at Falefa in c. 1550. In terms of succession to the title, the family has been among the least controversial of all Tama a ʻĀiga families. Family consensus decided successors rather than the court. However, these amicable relations were eventually fractured in 1965 when a major split appeared over the successor to Samoa's former co-Head of State Tupua Tamasese Meaʻole, who died two years earlier. Two first cousins and sons of previous holders vied for the title and the family was forced to resort to the court for a settlement.

The family had been unable to agree between two candidates, Lealofi IV, the son of assassinated Mau leader Tupua Tamasese Lealofi III, and Tufuga Efi, the son of Samoa's former co-Head of State Tupua Tamasese Meaʻole. The two men were first cousins, and their fathers had both held the titles. After deliberations dissolved, both were subsequently installed at separate ceremonies by the different political families of Sā Tupua: Lealofi IV by ʻĀiga Sā Fenunuivao of Falefa and Salani, and Tufuga Efi by ʻĀiga o Mavaega (of Faleasiʻu and Asau in Savaiʻi) and by a branch of ʻĀiga Sā Tuala from Fasitoʻouta. The latter's installation took ʻĀiga Sā Fenunuivao by surprise and was immediately met with stern rejection.

Both candidates were genealogically eligible, being descended from their common ancestor, Tupua Fuiavailili. However, Lealofi had the advantage of having the unanimous support of ʻĀiga Sā Fenunuivao, the title's main political family, on the grounds that his father was older than Tufuga Efi's father and he himself was the elder candidate. The subsequent court battle saw a unanimous endorsement of Lealofi IV's appointment. However, Tufuga Efi's supporters returned to the court to press two more lines of argument. First they argued that the title should be appointed and conferred by the immediate heirs of recent holders. ʻĀiga Sā Fenunuivao pointed out their right to step in and decide, especially seeing as there would inevitably be disagreement among descendants and pointing to the fact that Sā Fenunuivao were descendants themselves, a view also endorsed by the court. Second, Tufuga's supporters argued that the conjugate titles – Tupua and Tamasese – be split in two. They argued that the Tamasese name constituted a title in its own right and urged the court to award the Tupua title to Lealofi and the Tamasese title to Tufuga Efi. However, the court rejected this argument on the grounds that without Tupua, Tamasese could not be constituted as a title and that Tupua without Tamasese would disqualify Tupua from the rank of a Tama a ʻĀiga.

The court ruled in favour of ʻĀiga Sā Fenunuivao's candidate, Lealofi IV.

Tupua Tamasese Lealofi VI who would later go on to be elected Prime Minister of Samoa.

=== The second dispute ===
Upon Tupua Tamasese Lealofi IV's death in 1983, the question as to a successor was raised yet again with Tupuola Efi once again staking his claim. However, this would require ʻĀiga Sā Fenunuivao agreeing to his appointment and owing to the political manoeuvring which preceded Lealofi VI's passing, ʻĀiga Sā Fenunuivao were split on their candidate. Salani agreed however, Falefa and Lufilufi opposed. Despite the stalemate, Tupuola Efi pressed his claim and proceeded without the unanimous support of Āiga Sā Fenunuivao and most notably, that of Moeono Alaiʻasā Kolio Luafalemana and the Lufilufi polity. On the morning of his installation ceremony at Vaimoso, the nation's public broadcaster, Radio 2AP, read an announcement from Moeono, notifying the country that ʻĀiga Sā Fenunuivao as well as the chiefs of Lufilufi had not sanctioned Tupuola Efi's ascension to the title and would not allow for the ceremony to proceed at the title's appurtenant maota at Mulinuʻū ma Sepolataʻemo in Lufilufi. This effectively nullified Tupuola Efi's grasp for the title yet again.

=== Resolution ===
Between 1983 and 1986, Tupuola Efi, made several visitations to the now ailing Moeono Kolio Alaia'sa Luafalemana at his residence at Laloāoa, Falefa. Despite their his refusal, Moeono came to terms with Tupuola Efi in 1986 after several apologies by the latter. With their differences settled, Moeono sanctioned the process to commence yet again and Tupuola Efi was confirmed as Tupua Tamasese Efi on 5 November 1986.

However, the question of who had authority over the title was to be disputed and definitively determined the following year. The right of joint conferral was later challenged in court, with the main families within the Sa Tupua clan – Sā Fenunuivao, Sā Tuala and Aiga ʻo Mavaega – disputing authority over the title. The matter was decisively settled when in 1987, the court ruled that the right of conferral of the title belonged exclusively to ʻĀiga Sā Fenunuivao of Falefa and Salani.

== Line of succession ==
=== Tama-a-ʻĀiga: Tupua Tamasese ===
- King Tupua Fuiavailili – descendant of Queen Salamasina, adopted son of King Muagututiʻa and Fenunuivao, daughter of Leutele
- King Afoa – (defeated in single combat by his brother, Galumalemana. Thereafter named Afoafouvale, "he who rebels for no good reason".)
- King Galumalemana – (the Aloalii as an institution of succession is established by Galumalemana)
- King Nofoasaefā – (tyrant, assassinated by rebels in Savaiʻi)
- King Iʻamafana – (the last King installed by Lufilufi and the elders of Ātua. Allegedly willed his kingdom to Malietoa Vainuupo; succeeded by Safeofafine but was killed in combat; kingship passes to Tamafaigā of Manono through conquest.)
- 1751–1830: Maeaeafe Mataafa
- 1830–1860: Tupua Moegagogo
- 1860s–1891: Tui ʻĀana Tui ʻĀtua Tupua Tamasese Titimaea – (this is the first time Tamasese is used together with the Tupua title)
- 1891–1915: Tupua Tamasese Lealofi-o-aʻana I – son of Tupua Tamasese Titimaea.
- 1915–1918: Tupua Tamasese Lealofi-o-aʻana II – eldest son of Tupua Tamasese Lealofi-o-aʻana I
- 1918–1929: Tupua Tamasese Lealofi-oʻaʻana III – Mau leader, assassinated by NZ Soldiers during Black Saturday), younger brother of Tupua Tamasese Lealofi-o-aʻana II
- 1929–1963: Tupua Tamasese Meaʻole – younger brother of Tupua Tamasese Lealofi-o-aʻana III; Co-Head of State with Malietoa Tanumafili II after Independence.
- 1963–1983: Tui ʻĀtua Tupua Tamasese Lealofi-o-aʻana IV – (this is the first time Tamasese is formalised as part of the Tupua title) – Third Prime Minister of Samoa, son of Tupua Tamasese Lealofi-o-aʻana III
- 1986–present: Tui ʻĀtua Tupua Tamasese Efi – (Former Prime Minister and Head of State 2007–2017), son of Tupua Tamasese Meaʻole.

=== Tamāliʻi: Leutele ===
(Title founded in early pre-history: Records available at Lands & Titles Court, Samoa)

- Leutele Falealii
- Leutele Malota I
- Leutele Malota II
- Leutele Upuolevavau
- Leutele Faʻatalale
- Leutele Vaeluaga I
- Leutele Faletui Monike
- Leutele Vaʻafusuʻaga Poutoa
- Leutele Taumoumea Tuʻu
- Leutele Simaile Tuatagaloa
- Leutele Vaeluaga II
- Leutele Tapusatele Keli Tuatagaloa
- December 2024 – Present: Title jointly held by Leutele Malota Faleupolu Aliva and Leutele Mata Tuatagaloa

=== Aloaliʻi: Luafalemana ===
1. Luafalemana Leo'o – son of King Tupua Fuiavailili & Punipuao
2. Luafalemana Tupua Puta – son of Luafalemana Leo'o and Va'aloa Fiamē, daughter of Fiamē, the head of the Aiga Sā Levalasi branch of Lotofaga
3. Luafalemana Fagavale – parents – Maeataanoa Tauaaletoa Valema & Naimanu-ole-tuasivi (Naimanuoletuasivi is the daughter of Luafalemana Tupua Puta & Va'aloa)
4. Luafalemana Taua'aletoa Taligamaivalu Leala'iasalanoa – son of Luafalemana Fagavale and Vitolia, daughter of Lealaisalanoa Ielemia
5. Luafalemana Moeʻono Alaiʻasā Taʻeleomoamoa (Taele) Moeʻono
  - Grandson of Luafalemana Tupua Lealaisalanoa Taligamaivalu (title also bestowed to two other holders by Luafalemana Taele Moeʻono)
  - Luafalemana Aukusitino ('matupalapala' or gift; returned to the family after less than a year)
  - Luafalemana Eseese ('matupalapala' or gift; taken with him to Tutuila)
6. Luafalemana Leaupepe Aisaka Moeono
  - Son of Luafalemana Moeʻono Alaiʻasā Taʻeleomoamoa (Taele) Moeʻono.
  - After a third meeting held at Taulupe to address concerns raised by descendants regarding the Luafalemana title, the matter was respectfully set aside to maintain harmony.
  - Later honoured with the title 'Leaupepe' from his mother's family in Fasitoo-uta, and discussions about the Luafalemana title were postponed to preserve family unity.

The Luafalemana Title remains vacant as of mid 2025. It has been contested by various parties over the years, including an unsuccessful bid by prominent Samoan journalist and convicted felon, Leiataua Savea Al Harrington Lavea and his brother Romney Lavea, also a convicted felon.

=== Tulafale-Aliʻi (Matua): Moeʻono ===
(Title founded in early pre-history: Records before 1705 available at the Lands & Titles Court, Samoa)

- 1705–1735: Moeʻono Matamu – Granted authority to Tagataoleao Faʻamanini Tagaloa Leutele
- 1735–1765: Moeʻono Tagataoleao Faʻamanini Leutele Tagaloa Moeono
- 1765–1795: Moeʻono Faitā
- 1795–1825: Moeʻono Teʻo Faitā Moeono
- 1825–1855: Moeʻono Taemanutavaʻe Aifaʻalua
- 1889–1918: Moeʻono Sufalī – Parents: Lealaisalanoa Luafalemana Tauaaletoa Taligamaivalu & Siāmailē Moeʻono
- 1919–1922: Moeʻono Tailalo – Descendant/Suli of Moeʻono Faitā
- 1923–1957: Moeʻono Luafalemana Alaiʻasā Taeleomoamoa ("Taele") Moeʻono – Nephew of Moeʻono Sufalī – Parents: Alaiʻasā Aiotaua & Taeata Vitolia II (Taeata Vitolia II is the daughter of Lealaisalanoa Tupua Luafalemana Taligamaivalu)
- 1957–1987: Moeʻono Alaiʻasā Kolio – Son of Moeʻono Luafalemana Alaiʻasā Taeleomoamoa and Fonofono (Fonofono is the daughter of Leaupepe Faatoto I, Fasitoʻo-uta
- 1987–2018: Moeʻono Atoamafuaiupolu Tomanogi Penitito Alaiʻasā – Son of Moeono Alaiʻasā Kolio
- 2018–Present: The Moeʻono Title remains vacant.

=== Tulafale-Aliʻi (Matua): ʻIuli ===
(Records available at Lands & Titles Court, Samoa)

- Iuli Sale
- Iuli Tapa
- Iuli Veni
- Iuli Sefo I
- Iuli Tavita Tapa
- Iuli Sefo Fautuaʻalii
- Iuli Moefaʻauo Salale Moananu

== Population ==
The population of Falefa (exclusive of the other three villages that form the falefitu) is 1,563 (2016 Census).

South of the village settlement is Falefa Valley, Falefa's traditional territory southwards to neighbouring Lotofaga and eastwards to Fagaloa Bay.

== Faʻalupega: charter and salutations ==
A village faʻalupega is essentially a series of salutations that refer to a village or district's most important titles and descent groups. It provides a basic outline of its basic hierarchy and genealogies of note, thus the order of mention is usually (but not always) relevant, depending on the location and context.

The basic structure of Falefā's faʻalupega, in its most reduced version, is composed of three main parts, with the third allowing several possible variations:

1. ... ʻAiga ma aloaliʻi ... the chiefs (lit. 'Families') and the son (Luafalemana) of the royal chief (Tupua)
2. ... afio mai Sā Fenunuivao ... to you Sā Fenunuivao (descendants of Fenunuivao, family of Tupua le Tama an Aiga)
3. ... oulua matua, Iuli ma Moeʻono ... to you, the elder chief orators, ʻIuli and Moeʻono (rulers of Falefa)
4. ... ma le putuputu o tagata o le Tui Atua ...and the gathering of the people of the King of Atua (or ... ma le tofi faʻasolo i tagata o le Tui Atua) ... and the various appointments of the people of the King of Atua

The customary honorifics of Falefa are as follows:

- Tulouna le aai o Fonoti ma le fale e fagafua
- Tulouna a oulua matua: ʻIuli ma Moeʻono
- Tulouna oe Fulumuʻa na falelima aʻi fetalaiga ia te oe le Aai

ma le putuputu o tagata o le Tui Atua

- Afio mai Sā Fenunuivao
- Afio mai Leutele o le tina o Tupua
- Afio mai Lealaisalanoa o le tei o Tupua, o le tama a Malili e fa
- Afio mai Alaiʻasā na fita I tuga
- Afio mai Luafalemana o le Aloaliʻi.

== Important names and places in Falefa ==
=== Malae-Fono ===
- Moamoa.

O le malae-fono o Moamoa e faalgi o 'tua o Lalogāfuʻafuʻa (malaefono a Lufilufi) e pola puipui ʻei laua le māʻtuā ia ʻIuli ma Moeʻono ma le Tofi Faasolo i le Aai o le Tupu o Fonoti.

=== Maota o Alii ===
- Leutele – Vaiʻiliʻili ma Fogāvaiuta
- Lealaisalanoa – Vaieʻe
- Alaiʻasā – Gataivai ma Gataifusi
- Suluvave – Malae
- Luafalemana (Aloalii) – Taulupe

=== Laoa ===
- Moeʻono – Laloāoa
- ʻIuli – Nofopule

=== Saʻotamaʻitaʻi ===
- Leutele – Sa'ilau
- Salanoa – Fenūnūivao
- Luafalemana – Salaināʻoloa
- Alaiʻasā – Punipuao
- Suluvave – Aovaʻa

== See also ==
- Archaeology in Samoa
