= Sauano =

Village in Samoa

Coordinates: 13.91077°S 171.56382°W

Sauano or Sauago is a village on Fagaloa Bay, on the island of Upolu in Samoa. It is situated on the northeast coast of the island in the political district of Va'a-o-Fonoti. It is located very close to Saletele village; together the two are called Falelua ("two houses") and each are considered to be a subvillage (fale, "house") of Falefa. As of 1981, there was only a dirt road between Falefa and the two villages.

The population was 256 as of 2021.
