= Samamea =

Coordinates: 13°56′S 171°32′W

- Village District
- Location within Samoa
- Country: Samoa
- District: Va'a-o-Fonoti

Population (2016)
  - Total: 45
- Time zone: -11

Samamea is a village on the north east coast of Upolu island in Samoa. It is the main village or 'capital' of the political district Va'a-o-Fonoti. The village's population is 45.

Samamea is one of nine villages situated in Fagaloa Bay. The villages are nestled between the sea and rainforest mountains. The most eastern village in the bay is Uafato.
