= List of bays in Samoa =

This is a list of the bays of Samoa:

- Apia Bay
- Asau Bay
- Fagalele Bay
- Fagaloa Bay
- Lefaga Bay
- Matautu Bay
- Paluali Bay
- Papalaulelei Bay
- Salailua Bay
- Sataua Bay
- Siumu Bay
- Uafato Bay
- Vailele Bay
- Vaisala Bay
- Vaiusu Bay
