= Salimu =

Village in Samoa

Coordinates: 13°55′56.46″S 171°33′40.9″W

Salimu is a village on the island of Upolu in Samoa. It is situated on the north east coast of the island and is one of the main centres of the political district of Va'a-o-Fonoti.

The population was 65 as of 2016.
