= Maasina, Samoa =

Village on the island of Upolu in Samoa

Coordinates: 13.943°S 171.557°W

Maasina is a village on the island of Upolu in Samoa. It is situated on the north east coast of the island in the political district of Va'a-o-Fonoti.

The population was 129 as of 2016.
