= Musumusu =

Coordinates: 13°56′S 171°34′W

Musumusu is a small village on the island of Upolu in Samoa. It is situated on the north east coast of the island in the political district of Va'a-o-Fonoti.

The population was 72 as of 2016.
