= Fagaloa Bay – Uafato Tiavea Conservation Zone =

- Conservation area
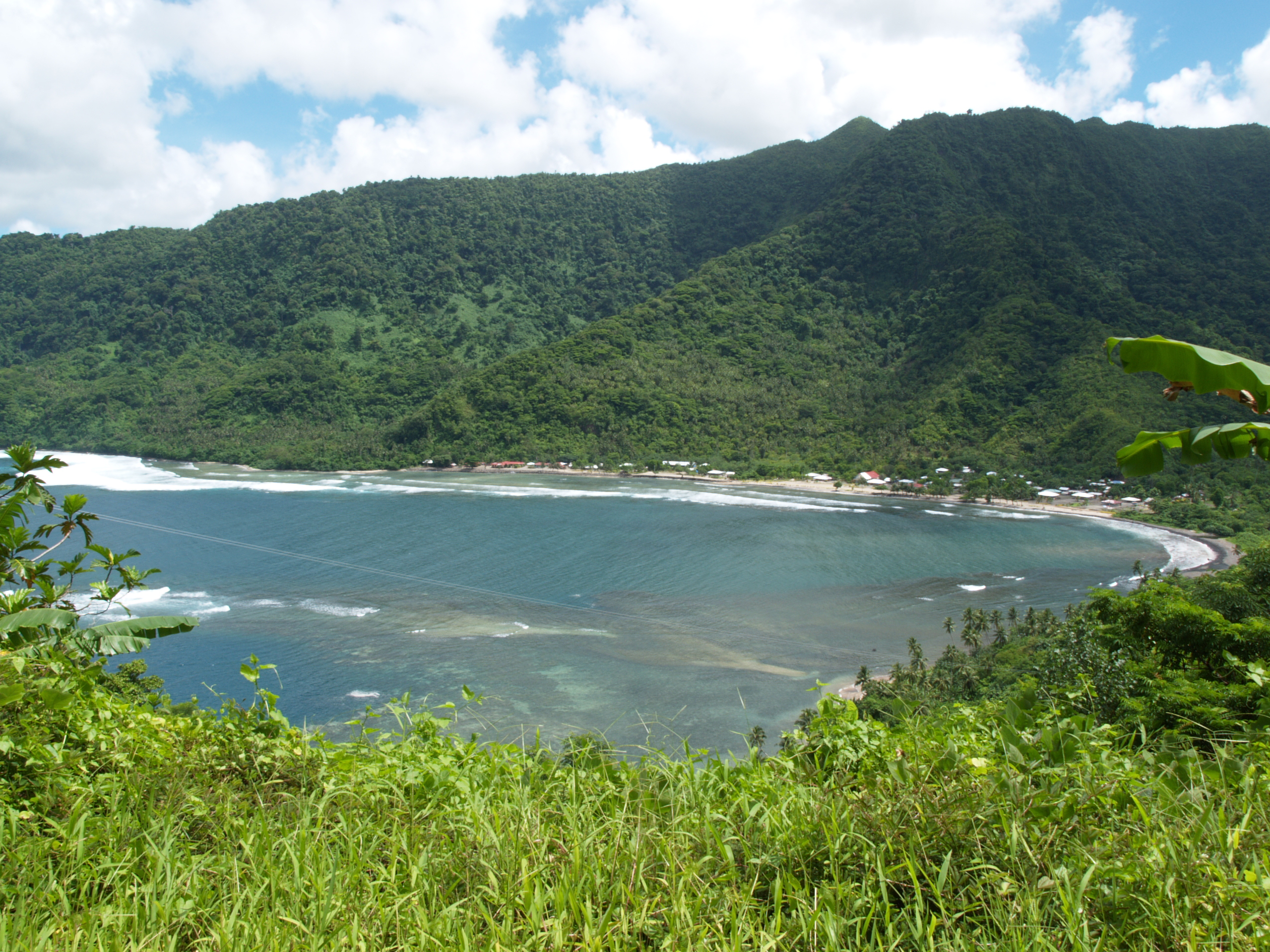
- View of Uafato village at Fagaloa Bay

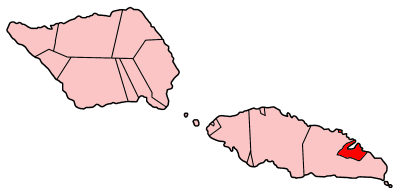
- Map of Samoa showing Va'a-o-Fonoti district.

- Location within Samoa
- Coordinates: 13.926864°S 171.540444°W
- Country: Samoa
- Time zone: UTC+13 (UTC+13)

The Fagaloa Bay – Uafato Tiavea Conservation Zone is located in the Va'a-o-Fonoti District of Samoa, on eastern Upolu Island.

== Description ==
The site is a nexus of sorts between the natural and cultural worlds: the largest tropical rain forest on any Pacific island with unique flora and fauna accompanied by the traditional Samoan cultural practices of Fa'a Samoa and the matai system.

== World Heritage Status ==
This site was added to the UNESCO World Heritage Tentative List on December 21, 2006, in the Mixed (Cultural + Natural) category.

== See also ==
- List of protected areas of Samoa
- Samoan plant names, includes scientific and English names. Many used in traditional Samoan medicine.
- Geography of Samoa
