= Ta'elefaga =

Village on the island of Upolu in Samoa

Coordinates: 13.9432722°S 171.569699°W

Ta'elefaga is a village on the island of Upolu in Samoa. It is situated on the north east coast of the island in the political district of Va'a-o-Fonoti.

The population was 234 as of 2016.

Ta’elefaga Primary School is located in the village. The school was rebuilt in 2019.

The village has frequently suffered problems with its water supply and marine environment due to the nearby Afulilo Dam. In 2016 the Samoa Electric Power Corporation completed a project to treat wastewater from the dam.

The village was struck by a tsunami following the 2025 Kamchatka earthquake, causing damage to homes and the village church.
