= Uafato =

- Village & Conservation Area
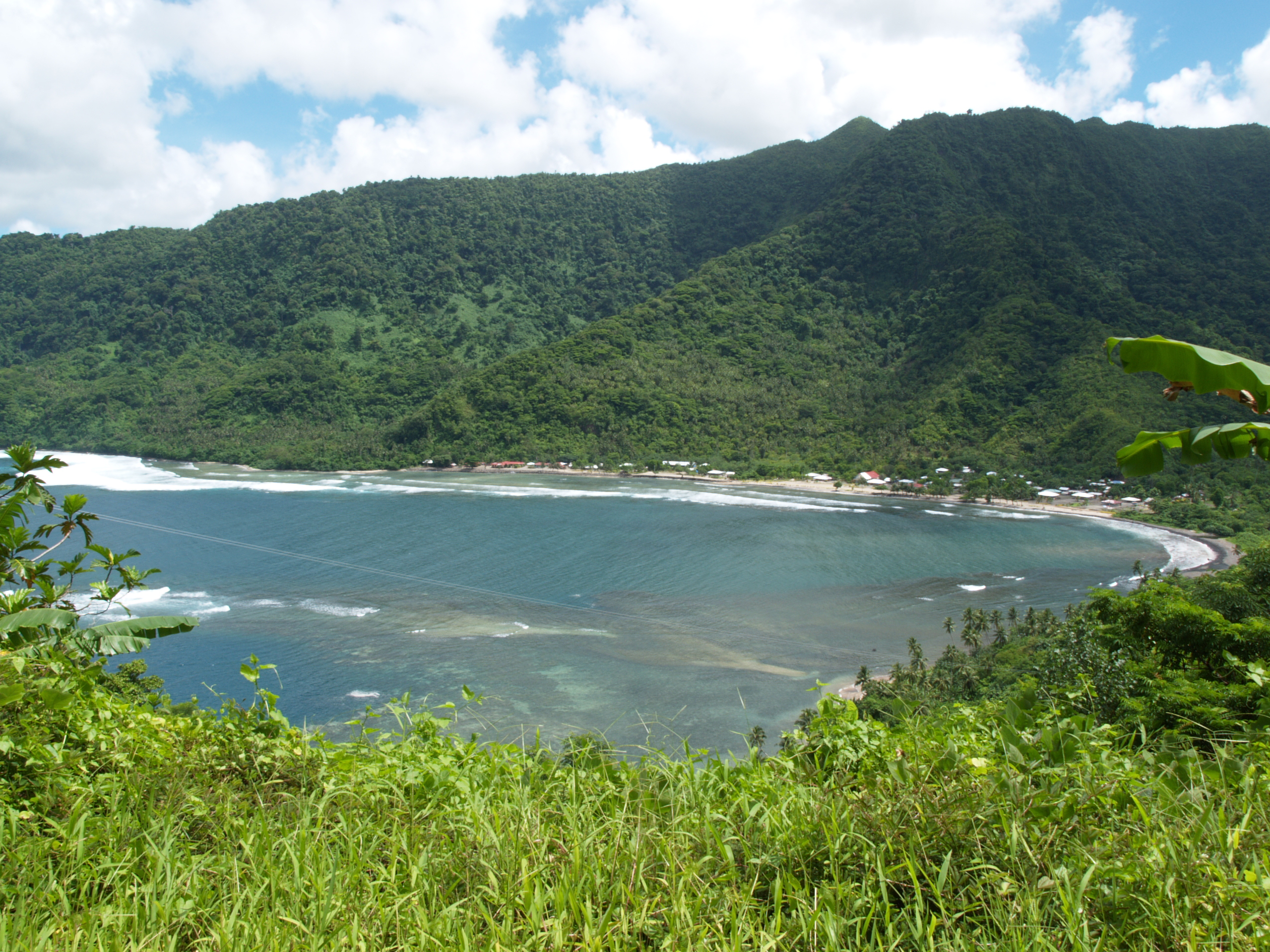
- View of Uafato village from access road

- Location within Samoa
- Coordinates: 13°55′14.46″S 171°25′28.35″W
- Country: Samoa
- District: Va'a-o-Fonoti

Population (2016)
  - Total: 254
- Time zone: -11

Uafato is a village on the north east coast of Upolu island in Samoa within the political district of Va'a-o-Fonoti. It has a population of 254. The village is part of a conservation zone called the Uafato Conservation Area with national and global significance as a unique cultural and conservation area.

The village is one of nine small village settlements situated at Fagaloa Bay. It is surrounded by the Uafato Tiavea Conservation Zone with lush rainforest, rugged topography, waterfalls and coral reefs.

== Village ==
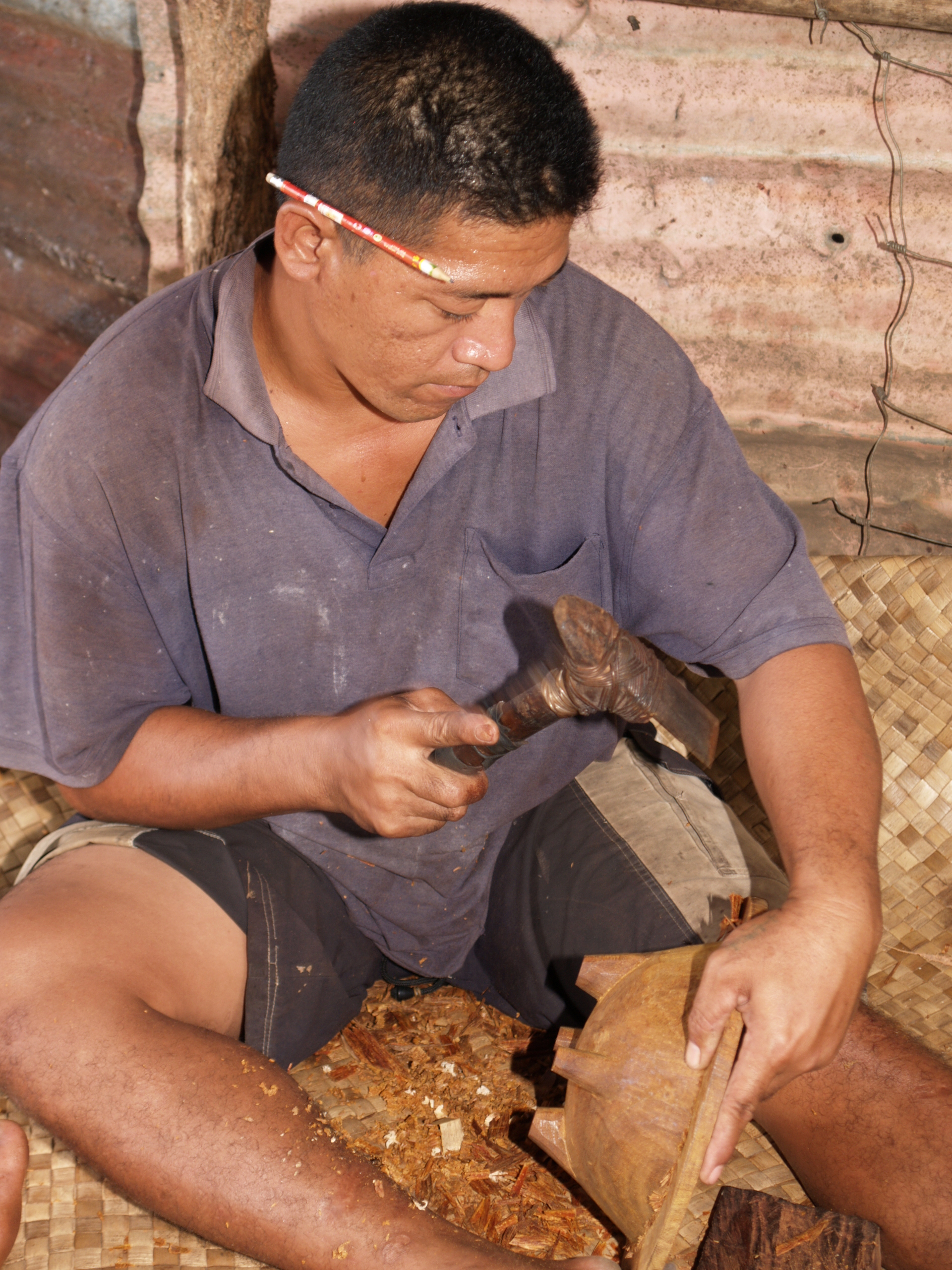
Carving a kava bowl

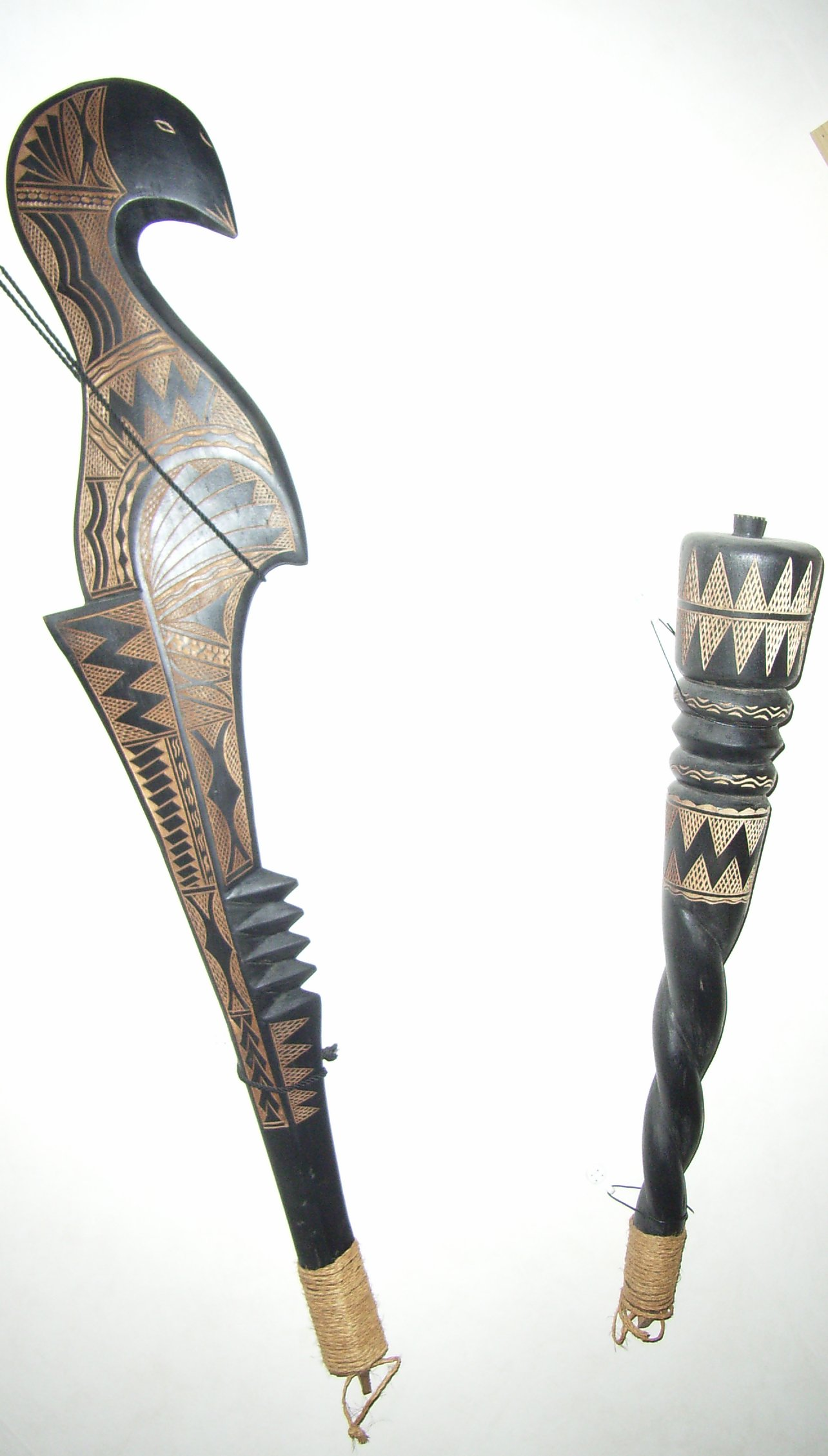
Carved Samoan weapons

Uafato village is the most eastern of the villages in the bay and nestled between the sea and rainforest mountains. Access to Uafato village is by a narrow access road leading from Fagaloa Bay. Like most villages in Samoa, the people of Uafato maintain a traditional lifestyle and culture governed by fa'a Samoa, the matai chiefly system and va tapu'ia interaction with their natural environment. The rainforest remains an important economic base for the local people. The forests surrounding the village contains one of the largest remaining stands of a native hardwood tree ifilele (Intsia bijuga) with many uses in Samoan culture including housebuilding and carving.

The village is a centre for traditional woodcarving where visitors can watch carvers making kava bowls, war clubs and other local crafts. Like women in most villages in Samoa, the women of Uafato weave finely woven mats, fans and handicrafts which are an important source of income for their families. The reputation of the local woodcarvers has grown over the last two decades and the carvers of Uafato supply the craft markets in the capital Apia. Most of the techniques used in crafting the traditional artwork is much the same as they were prior to western contact.

The village is an hour and a half from the country's capital Apia and a visit can be undertaken in a day. There are beach fale accommodation where visitors may stay overnight or for day trips.

== Uafato Conservation Area ==
The conservation area is ancestral land owned by the families of Uafato. The conservation zone includes the village and Fagaloa Bay and approximately 1,300 hectares of forestlands. Fauna includes two varieties of bat and 22 bird species including the endangered tooth-billed pigeon (Didunculus strigirostris), also known as Samoan pigeon which are confined to undisturbed forests. It is the national bird of Samoa and is called the Manumea. The initiative for a conservation area came from the chiefs and the village following cyclones in 1991 which destroyed much of the village. The council of chiefs approached a private environmental group, O Le Siosiomaga Society, for assistance. A year later, the Uafato Conservation Area was established with funding from the Pacific Regional Environment Programme (formerly SPREP).

The term ‘conservation’ is not new to us. One purpose of the conservation area is to keep international logging companies out of Uafato, because we depend on the forest for our survival. It is a matter of common sense.

— High Chief Alailefue Lisale, 69 years old

Alaifue Lisale died in 2010, and Vaisa Laumea 66 years old was named the High Chief of Uafato at Christmas 2009.

== Mythology ==
- There are different stories for the origins of the name Uafato. One story tells of the name originating from the stacking of humans to build Lufasiaitu's house made of 100 human poles. One human was made to stand on the neck (ua) of the other to make one pole. Thus, the origin of the chiefly title 'Faleselau' (fale meaning house, selau - hundred) which bears reference to the hundred poles of Lufasiaitu's house.
- Another story relates that the supreme god Tagaloa lived in the ninth heaven above Uafato village.

== See also ==
- Fagaloa Bay – Uafato Tiavea Conservation Zone
- Central Savai'i Rainforest, largest continuous patch of rainforest in Polynesia
