= Eckhard Supp =

German non-fiction author (born 1950)

- Born: 23 August 1950 (age 76); Bad Ems, Germany
- Education: Johann Wolfgang Goethe-Universität Frankfurt am Main(DPhil)
- Occupations: journalist, wine critic
- Writing career
- Subjects: journalism, wine

Eckhard Supp (born 23 August 1950) is a German non-fiction author, journalist, photographer and wine critic.

== Early life and education ==
Supp was born in 1950 at Bad Ems, a small town near Koblenz.

From 1969 to 1975, he studied Pedagogics, Political Science, History, Philosophy and Sociology at the Johann Wolfgang Goethe-Universität Frankfurt am Main, Germany. In 1985, he took a doctoral degree (DPhil) in sociology with a thesis on Australia's aborigines (Australiens Aborigines – Ende der Traumzeit).

== Photography ==
In 1975 and 1976, he collaborated in the compilation of an index & glossary for the complete edition of German philosopher Georg Wilhelm Friedrich Hegel.

From 1977 to 1984, he lived and worked as a freelance photographer and journalist in Paris (France), where he cooperated with the French photo agency Rapho. From 1984 to 1989 he lived in Rome (Italy). His photoreportages took him to numerous European countries as well as to Angola, South Africa, Namibia, Australia, Mauritius, the Seychelles, the U.S. and Chile. In 2015 his photographs were exhibited at Paris, Frankfurt, Hamburg, Naples, Rome and in the U.S. (Indiana University, Bloomington). His photographs of Naples were exhibited in 1999 in The Century of the Body: 100 Photoworks 1900-2000 (Lisbon, Lausanne) together with those of Alfred Stieglitz, Man Ray, Brassai, Edward Weston, Imogen Cunningham, Bill Brandt, Lee Friedlander, in 2015, together with the work of Helmut Newton, Robert Mapplethorpe, Gianni Berengo Gardin, Verena von Gagern and others it the retrospective exhibition BLOW UP – Fotografia a Napoli 1980–1990 (Naples).

== Writing ==
Eckhard Supp is the author or co-author of more than 30 wine and travel books. Since 1986, Eckhard Supp writes among other topics about food and wine. In 1992 he founded the publishing house of ENO Verlag, specialized in wine publications.

From 2003 to 2009, he was the editor and main author of two special volumes on wine and cooking for The Brockhaus Enzyklopädie, a German encyclopedia. In 2005, he was editor-in-chief for two cooking magazines, essen & trinken and schöner essen at Gruner + Jahr publishers.

Since February 2015, Eckhard Supp is publisher and editor-in-chief of the quarterly magazine "enos – of wine, people and cultures".

== Bibliography ==
- Ils vivent autrement. Paris 1982. (with I. Diener)
- Australiens Aborigines – Ende der Traumzeit. Bonn. 1985.
- Azania. Berlin 1986.
- Rom. Hamburg 1990.
- Seychellen. Ostfildern 1991.
- Wein für Einsteiger. München 1992.
- Enzyklopädie des Italienischen Weins. Offenbach 1995.
- Enzyklopädie des Österreichischen Weins. Offenbach 1996.
- Wein für Einsteiger – Italien. München 1997.
- Enzyklopädie des Deutschen Weins. Offenbach 1997.
- Eno-Ratgeber: 100 Tips zum Wein. Offenbach 1999.
- Eno-Ratgeber: ABC Italien. Offenbach 2000.
- Rotwein-Lexikon. Hamburg 2001.
- Weißwein-Lexikon. Hamburg 2002.
- Eno-Ratgeber: ABC Deutschland, Österreich und Schweiz. Göttingen 2002.
- Der Brockhaus – Wein. Mannheim 2004, 2nd, completely revised edition 2009.
- Weinglossar für Globetrotter. Göttingen 2004.
- Wein – Das große Einsteigerbuch. Göttingen 2006.
- Der Brockhaus – Kochkunst. Mannheim 2007.
- Duden – Wörterbuch Wein. Mannheim 2011.
- Duden – Wörterbuch Kochkunst. Mannheim 2011.

== Bibliography ==
- "Eckhard Supp neuer Chefredakteur von "essen & trinken"". boersenblatt.net (in German).
- "Eckhard Supp neuer Chefredakteur von "essen & trinken". presseportal.de (in German). 20 December 2004.
- "Vom Sterben großer Weine". Der Freitag. 6 February 2012.
- "Das Internet und die Medien". Der Freitag. 9 January 2010.
