= Samoan United People's Party =

The Samoa United Peoples Party was a political party in Samoa. It contested the 2001 election, winning 2.5% of popular votes and 1 out of 49 seats. It has not contested subsequent elections.

The party was deregistered in February 2020 after not paying its registration fee.
