= Lona, Samoa =

Village on the island of Upolu, Samoa

Coordinates: 13.942°S 171.543°W

Lona is a village on the island of Upolu in Samoa. It is situated on the north east coast of the island in the political district of Va'a-o-Fonoti.

The population was 237 as of 2016.
