= 2001 Samoan general election =

| ← 1996 | 2 March 2001 | 2006 → |

All 49 seats in the Legislative Assembly 25 seats needed for a majority
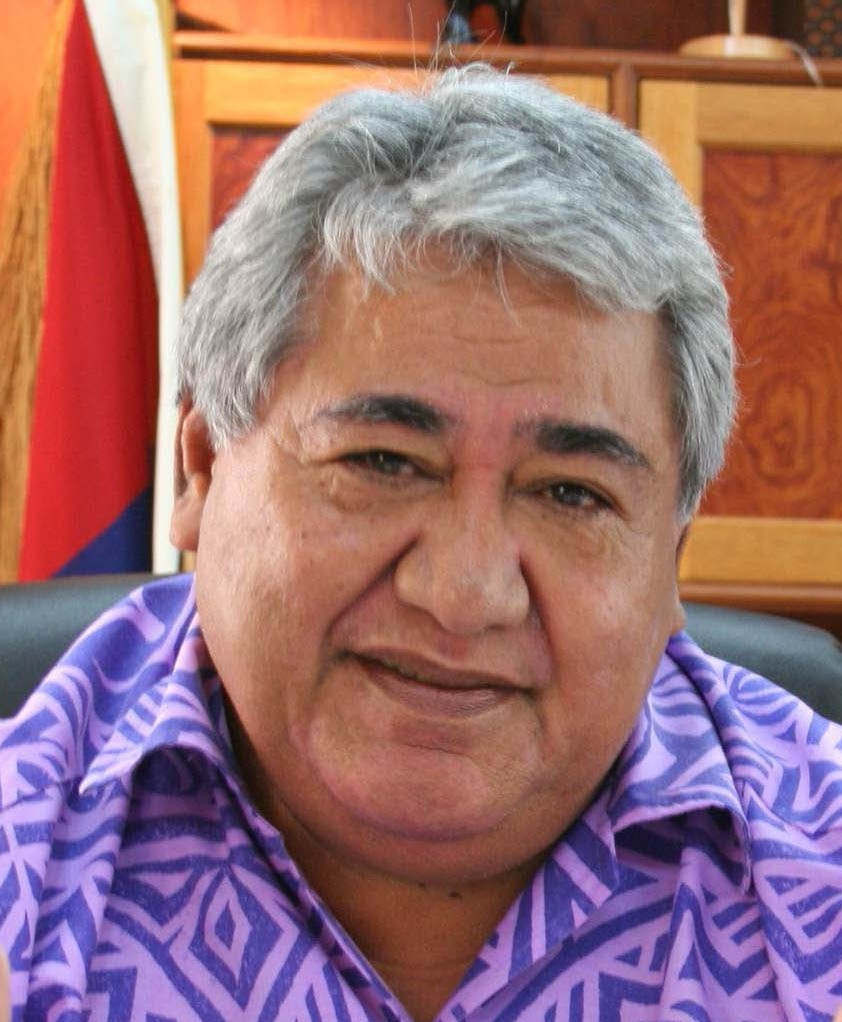

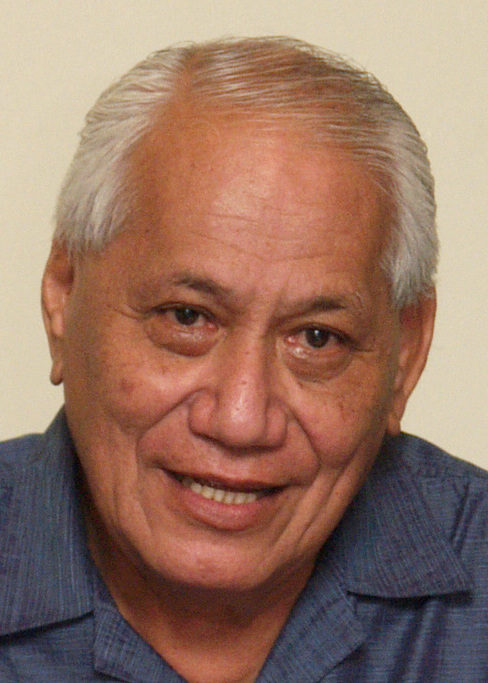
| | First party | Second party | Third party |
|---|---|---|---|
| | | | SUPP |
| Leader | Tuilaʻepa Saʻilele Malielegaoi | Tui Ātua Tupua Tamasese Efi |
| Party | HRPP | SNDP | SUPP |
| Last election | 43.54%, 24 seats | 26.09%, 11 seats | – |
| Seats won | 23 | 13 | 1 |
| Seat change | ▼1 | ▲2 | New |
| Popular vote | 34,262 | 17,966 | 1,898 |
| Percentage | 44.82% | 23.50% | 2.48% |
| Swing | ▲1.28pp | ▼2.59pp | New |
Prime Minister before election
Tuilaʻepa Saʻilele Malielegaoi
HRPP
Subsequent Prime Minister
Tuilaʻepa Saʻilele Malielegaoi
HRPP

General elections were held in Samoa on 2 March 2001 to determine the composition of the 13th Parliament. Four parties contested the election, including the ruling Human Rights Protection Party (HRPP) and the main opposition Samoan National Development Party (SNDP). The HRPP was led into the election by Prime Minister Tuilaʻepa Saʻilele Malielegaoi, who succeeded Tofilau Eti Alesana in 1998 following his resignation.

No party won a majority; the HRPP secured the most seats, winning 23, while the SNDP won 13. The newly formed Samoan United People's Party (SUPP) won a single seat, and 12 independents were successful. Following the election, the HRPP won the support of four independents, including three non-member party affiliates, allowing it to remain in government. SNDP Leader Tui Ātua Tupua Tamasese Efi resigned shortly after the party's loss and was succeeded by Le Mamea Ropati. The Supreme Court later voided the election of five members of parliament, after finding them guilty of charges brought about by electoral petitions.

== Background ==
During the previous election held in 1996, the governing HRPP won 24 seats, losing its pre-election majority, although it remained the largest party. The main opposition, the Samoan National Development Party, secured 11 seats, and the newly formed Western Samoa Labour Party won a single seat. Independents saw a rise in support, with 13 entering parliament; the decline in support for both major parties was reportedly due to the HRPP's 1994 corruption scandal and the widespread perception of the SNDP as an ineffective opposition.

In 1997, parliament voted to change the country's name from Western Samoa to Samoa. Prime Minister Tofilau Eti Alesana argued an official change was necessary to resolve a naming inconsistency, as numerous organisations worldwide, including the United Nations, referred to the nation simply as Samoa. The prime minister alleged that Tui Ātua Tupua Tamasese Efi, the opposition leader and a former prime minister, was responsible for the inconsistency, having ordered a change in the name used at the United Nations. Efi opposed the change, arguing it risked offending American Samoans, as the name Samoa may have originated outside Western Samoa. The opposition leader also claimed the motion was a distraction from a passport scandal that surfaced in the same year, where the government had been illegally selling Samoan passports to Chinese and Taiwanese nationals. While the governor of American Samoa, Tauese Sunia, expressed no issue with the modification, many American Samoans believed the change would undermine the territory's identity.

In 1998, Alesana resigned as prime minister and leader of the HRPP due to ill health, he was succeeded by Tuila‘epa Sa‘ilele Malielegaoi. Alesana remained in cabinet as a minister without portfolio until his death in 1999.

== Electoral system ==
During the time of the 2001 election, Samoa's parliament, the legislative assembly, was composed of 49 seats, with each member serving a five year term. Thirty-five members were elected from single-member constituencies, six constituencies elected two members, whilst the other two were elected through individual voters, mostly non-ethnic Samoans and individuals with partial Samoan ancestry. Candidates were elected using the First-past-the-post voting system. Only Matai (Chiefs) were permitted to contest any of the 47 constituencies, whilst the other two seats were open to all individuals. The controversial Electoral Amendment act, which came into effect in 2000, required candidates to have resided in Samoa for at least three years to qualify as a candidate. Previously, the requirement was 12 months. Civil servants were not allowed to run.

=== Voters ===
The government introduced Universal suffrage in 1991, granting Samoan citizens aged 21 and older the right to vote. Voters could elect to enrol in a constituency rather than the one where they reside by right of significant family ties or matai titles. As a result, the population of constituencies and the constituency's voter roll have not always correlated. Cabinet amended the 1963 electoral act in August 2000, establishing the register of voters as a separate entity from the legislative assembly. The 2001 election was the first in which it was compulsory for all eligible individuals to register to vote. The new register of voters commenced the enrollment of electors in October 2000. There were only two registration centres where individuals could enrol or update their details, with one each at Mulinuʻu on Upolu, and Savaiʻi. Due to the centres being severely understaffed, the process was reportedly chaotic, with long queues, and many voters waited for several hours. One person died while in line, and several fights broke out due to discontent over the process. As a result, Health Minister Misa Telefoni Retzlaff unsuccessfully called for the election's postponement. At the closure of voter registration on 19 January 2001, a total of 92,788 voters were registered.

==== Overseas voting ====
Although more Samoans resided outside Samoa than in the country around the time of the election, the HRPP government refused to entertain overseas voting. Prime Minister Tuila‘epa expressed his opposition to allowing "outsiders" to participate in the electoral process and said that "they (Samoans abroad) don't understand, and they don't feel the pain serving Samoa day in and day out." The prime minister also stated that if overseas ballots were allowed, "Parliament might as well be moved from Mulinuʻu to Canberra." Opposition Leader Tui Ātua Tupua Tamasese Efi, opposed the government's decision due to the Samoan diaspora's significant contribution to the economy through remittance funds.

== Schedule ==
On the advice of the prime minister, the O le Ao o le Malo (head of state), Malietoa Tanumafili II, signed a declaration on 22 January 2001, ordering the dissolution of the 12th Parliament, which went into effect the following day. Voter registration closed on 19 January. The O le Ao o le Malo issued the writ for the election on 30 January. The deadline for candidates to register or withdraw was on 16 February, and the return of the writ occurred on 18 March.

| Date | Event |
|---|---|
| 19 January | Registration for voters closes |
| 23 January | The 12th Parliament is dissolved |
| 30 January | O le Ao o le Malo issues Writ for the election |
| 16 February | Candidate nominations close |
| 2 March | Election day |
| 18 March | Writ for the election returned |

== Parties and candidates ==
Four parties contested the election, including the governing Human Rights Protection Party, led by Prime Minister Tuila‘epa Sa‘ilele Malielegaoi, and the main opposition Samoan National Development Party, led by Tui Ātua Tupua Tamasese Efi. The Samoa All People's Party (SAPP) and the newly formed Samoa United People's Party (SUPP), which registered with the electoral commission a month before the poll, also participated.

A total of 153 candidates competed in the election, a slight decrease from the 163 in 1996. The HRPP fielded 55, while 33 were affiliated with the SNDP. The SUPP stood five candidates, the SAPP had one contestant, and the other 59 were independents. Among the independents were five HRPP affiliates who were challenging incumbents from the party; they were, therefore, not permitted to run as members of the HRPP due to the party's policy of endorsing incumbents over challengers. Nine candidates were women; four were HRPP members, while the other five were independents.

| Party | Leader | Candidates | Founded | 1996 seats |
|---|---|---|---|---|
| Human Rights Protection Party | Tuilaʻepa Saʻilele Malielegaoi | 55 | 1979 | 24 / 49 |
| Samoan National Development Party | Tui Ātua Tupua Tamasese Efi | 33 | 1988 | 11 / 49 |
| Samoa All People's Party | Matatumua Maimoana | 1 | 1996 | 0 / 49 |
| Samoan United People's Party | — | 5 | 2001 | — |
| Independents | — | 58 | — | 13 / 49 |

== Campaign ==
Party manifestos rarely featured in previous elections; however, the 2001 poll saw an increased presence of political manifestos. Both the HRPP and SNDP published one, and it was the first election in which the HRPP had a clearly defined platform. Despite this, public engagement with the party platforms was low, and some voters reported that the manifestos were not widely available. Many candidates chose to campaign on their record and what they aimed to accomplish as individuals if elected, and often did not make mention of their party's policies or their party affiliation altogether. Significant issues of concern among voters included infrastructure, rural development, healthcare and education.

The HRPP campaigned on increasing foreign aid to improve the country's infrastructure. The party also announced its intentions to boost the economy and improve the health and education sectors. The prime minister claimed the opposition SNDP could not provide a credible alternative to the HRPP and the Samoan people. The SNDP platform focused on reforming the government and ceasing corruption. Opposition Leader Efi and the party proposed the establishment of a special task force to end corruption within the government and that independent commissions of inquiry investigate government scandals, including 1997 passports scandal and the controversial dismissal of Chief Auditor Su‘a Rimoni Ah Chong. The opposition leader blamed the HRPP administration for the mishandling of the state-owned Polynesian Airlines, which he claimed led to an increase in the nation's debt. The party carried out weekly press conferences criticising the government. Malielegaoi predicted that the HRPP would retain power.

== Conduct ==
On election day, polling stations were open from 9:00 to 15:00. Voters still queuing to vote at 15:00 were handed special cards by polling staff, allowing them to cast their ballots. Voting was reportedly peaceful and orderly, despite intense weather in Upolu and Western Savaiʻi in the final hours of voting. The preliminary count was completed on election day, and the official count began on 3 March and concluded ten days later.

== Results ==
The official results were released on 12 March. The HRPP won the most seats but fell short of a majority, securing 23, similar to the 24 seats it won in the previous election. The SNDP secured 13, an increase of two compared to its seat share in 1996; one SUPP member was successful, and 12 independents were elected. One member was elected unopposed. Three women won representation; two were newcomers, while Fiamē Naomi Mataʻafa was the only incumbent female candidate to win re-election. Half of the MPs in the new parliament were newcomers or former members. Two cabinet ministers were unseated.

| Party | Votes | % | Seats | +/– |
|---|---|---|---|---|
| Human Rights Protection Party | 34,262 | 44.82 | 23 | −1 |
| Samoan National Development Party | 17,966 | 23.50 | 13 | +2 |
| Samoan United People's Party | 1,898 | 2.48 | 1 | New |
| Samoa All People's Party | 10 | 0.01 | 0 | 0 |
| Independents | 22,315 | 29.19 | 12 | −1 |
| Total | 76,451 | 100.00 | 49 | 0 |
| Valid votes | 76,451 | 99.53 | | |
| Invalid/blank votes | 360 | 0.47 | | |
| Total ballots cast | | – | | |
| Registered voters/turnout | 92,791 | – | | |
Source: Nohlen et al.

== Aftermath ==
Following the election, four independents joined the HRPP, permitting it to remain in government. Three of these new HRPP members had pledged to join the party if they were victorious, while one had intended to join whichever party won the most seats. The HRPP caucus elected Health Minister Misa Telefoni Retzlaff as the party's deputy leader, he subsequently became deputy prime minister. Both positions had been vacant since Malielegaoi assumed office as prime minister in 1998. The prime minister claimed the appointment undercut rumours that Misa intended to leave the HRPP and form a new opposition party. The O le Ao o le Malo, Malietoa Tanumafili II, officially opened the 13th parliamentary session on 19 March 2001. The SNDP demanded a second recount in 20 constituencies, claiming the initial vote tally and the original recount were flawed. Efi resigned as leader of both the opposition and the SNDP, he was succeeded by Le Mamea Ropati.

Some unsuccessful candidates filed electoral petitions against their victorious opponents. Of the ten petitions, five alleged corrupt practices on the part of the winning contestant, including bribery and treating and three challenged the eligibility of candidates. One alleged a successful candidate's victory was carried by the votes of ineligible voters, while another petition claimed the results in a constituency were invalid. Before the courts tried any petitions, one was withdrawn after the petitioner, Afamasaga Fa‘amatala Tole‘afoa, reached an understanding with the defendant, Fagafagamanuli‘i Therese McCarthy, agreeing to reconcile due to their shared affiliation with the United Independents bloc (later the Samoan United Independents Party, SUIP). McCarthy also withdrew a counter-petition. The courts dismissed four petitions, while it upheld five - voiding the results in these constituencies. After the courts processed all the petitions and the occurrence of all subsequent by-elections, the HRPP seat share had risen to 29, the SNDP's total remained at 13, and independents occupied the rest. Parties in parliament are required to have at least eight seats to attain recognition as a parliamentary party; because the SUPP fell short of this threshold, the party's sole MP was classified as an independent.

== See also ==
- List of members of the Legislative Assembly of Samoa (2001–2006)
