= Vaʻa-o-Fonoti =

Coordinates: 13°57′S 171°32′W

- District
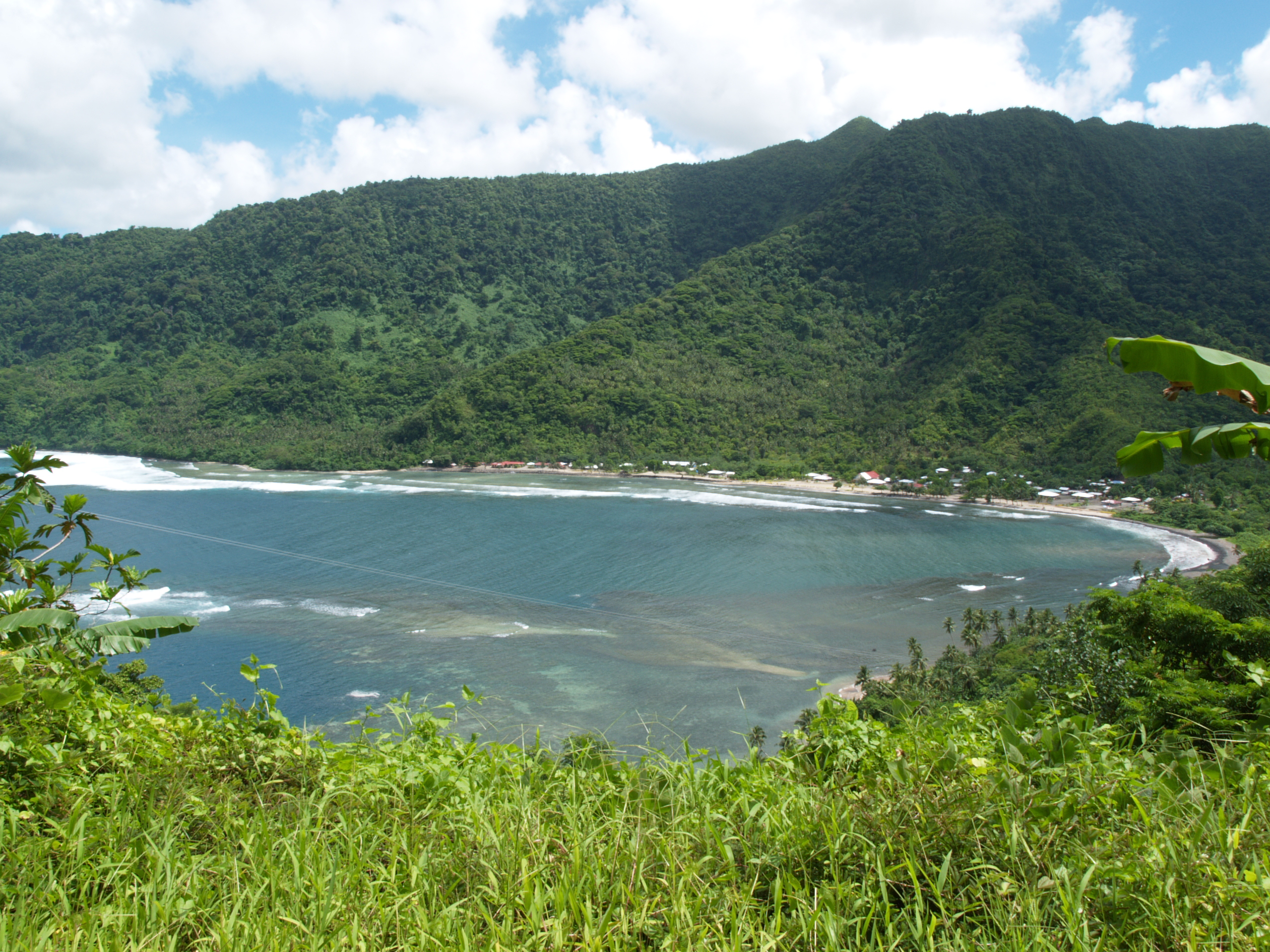
- View of Uafato village at Fagaloa Bay

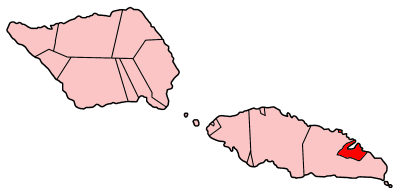
- Map of Samoa showing Vaʻa-o-Fonoti district.
- Country: Samoa

Government
  - Member of Parliament: Mauʻu Siaosi Puʻepuʻemai

Population (2016)
  - Total: 1,621
- Time zone: +13

Vaʻa-o-Fonoti is a district on the north east coast of Upolu Island in Samoa, with a population (2016 Census) of 1,621, making it the least populated district in the country and the Second smallest one by area after Aiga-i-le-Tai.

The district is 38 km^{2} and consists of a main area around Fagaloa Bay with nine villages and a small coastal exclave about 10 km further northwest, with the village of Faleāpuna (pop. 582). The district includes areas with significant conservation and cultural values. Vaʻa-o-Fonoti geographical boundaries are surrounded by the larger district of Atua. The capital of Vaʻa-o-Fonoti is Samamea.

The small settlement of Uafato is part of the Uafato Conservation Area, a project started by the villagers in the early 1990s, to protect their environment from logging. The area has gained a reputation in the last decade for woodcarving and traditional arts and crafts in Samoa.

== Historical ==
Vaʻa-o-Fonoti was established within the district of Atua in the 16th century when Fonoti Tupu Tafaʻifa ('King') when he was victorious in the preceding war with his siblings Vaʻafusuaga Toleʻafoa and Samalaʻulu. King Fonoti rewarded the people of this part of Atua for the role they played in securing his victory. Vaʻa-o-Fonoti ("The longboat or war canoe of Fonoti") is the honour bestowed upon the region for the bravery of the naval canoes who defeated Manono, Sapapaliʻi and Saleaumua in the fighting that took part on the sea.

The paramount titles of the district is Ulualofaiga Talamaivao. There is no current occupant of the title.

== Electoral results ==
2021 Samoan general election
Party	Candidate	Votes	%	±%
HRPP	Mauʻu Siaosi Puʻepuʻemai	751	63.7	
Independent	Fauoo Fatu Tielu	269	22.8	
FAST	Logo Pelenatino Lavataʻi	71	6.0	
HRPP	Valaʻau Togia Maʻalaelu	63	5.3	
HRPP	Taumainamoe Aufui Tuimalatu	25	2.1	
HRPP hold		Swing	+13.7	

2016 Samoan general election
Party	Candidate	Votes	%	±%
HRPP	Tialavea Tionisio Hunt	573	50.0	+9.1
Independent	Leilua Tavas Leota	254	22.2	
Independent	Molioo Pio Leo	215	18.8	
Independent	Ofoia Vaipua Nomeneta	103	9.0	
HRPP hold		Swing	+9.1	

2011 Samoan general election
Party	Candidate	Votes	%	±%
HRPP	Tialavea Tionisio Hunt	774	40.9	
HRPP	Taito Faitele	663	35.0	
HRPP	Togiai Eteuati Faiʻilagi	235	12.4	
TSP	Togia Ioane Sagapotulele	152	8.8	
HRPP	Tautaiolefua Nomeneta Ofoia	70	3.7	
HRPP hold		Swing	15.4	

2006 Samoan general election
Party	Candidate	Votes	%	±%
HRPP	Leao Talalelei Tuitama	369	24.5	
SDUP	Togiai Fuatau Eteuati Faiilagi	365	24.3	
Independent	Taito Aliifaalogo Faitele	348	23.1	
HRPP	Leniu Fea Tionisio Seinafolava Hunt	269	17.9	
HRPP	Leilua Tavas Leota	153	10.2	
HRPP gain from SDUP		Swing	-17.7	

2001 Samoan general election
Party	Candidate	Votes	%	±%
SDUP	Masoe Filisi	797	53.5	
HRPP	Moliʻo Teofilo	738	45.0	
Independent	Vaipuʻa Setu	23	1.4	

== See also ==
- Fagaloa Bay – Uafato Tiavea Conservation Zone
